= Toby Keith discography =

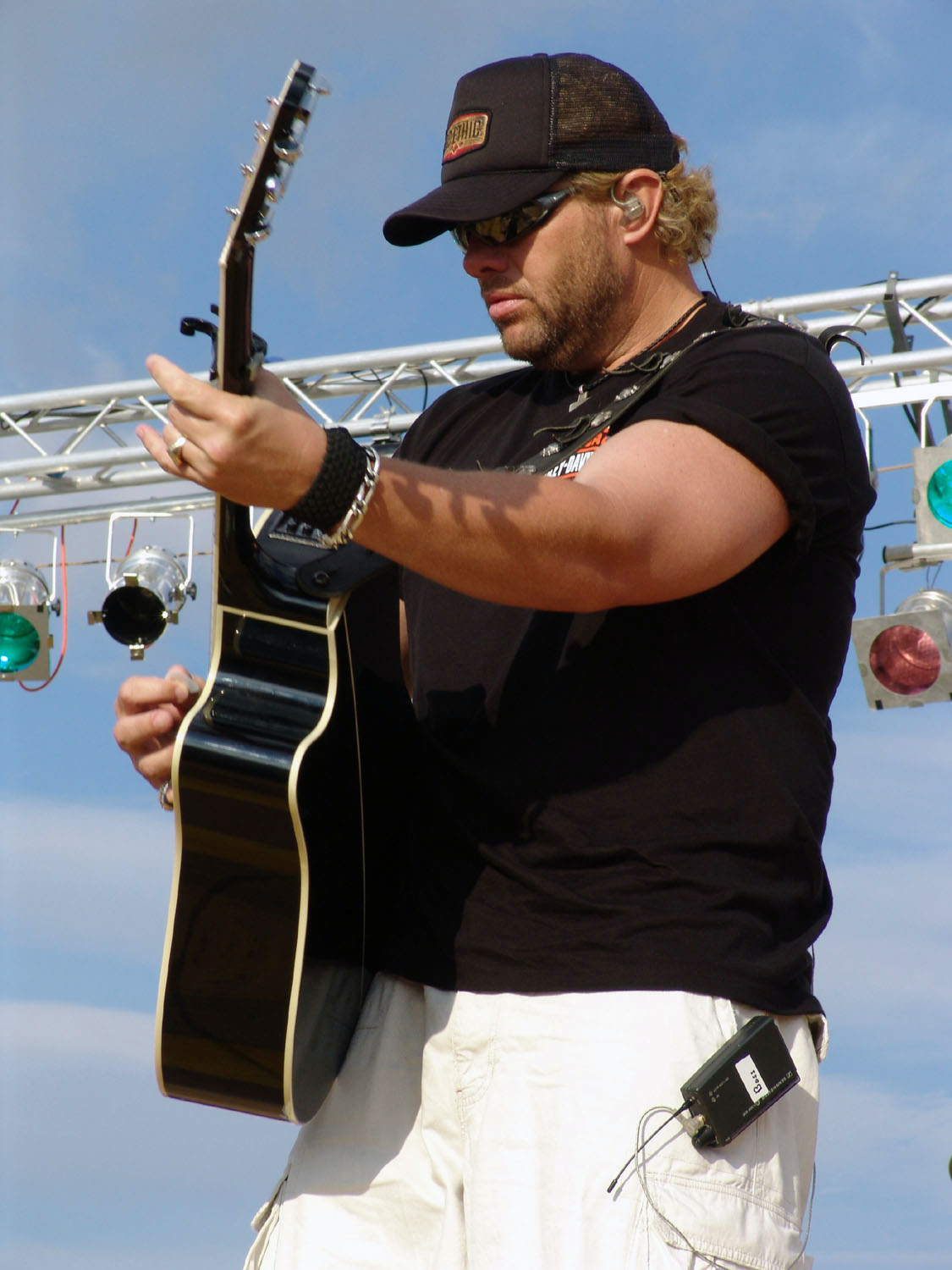
- Toby Keith performing live on June 1, 2004.
- Studio albums: 21
- Compilation albums: 8
- Singles: 71
- Music videos: 54
- Guest singles: 5
- Other charted songs: 7
- No. 1 singles (Billboard): 20

American country music singer Toby Keith released 21 studio albums and eight compilation albums. He released 71 singles, with 66 of them charting on the Billboard country chart; 54 reached the top 40, 40 made the top 10, and 20 went to number one from 1993 to 2021.

Keith sold more than 30 million albums in the US, which made him the fifth best-selling country artist in the US since 1991, when Nielsen SoundScan started tracking music sales.

== Studio albums ==
=== 1990s ===
Title	Album details	Peak chart positions			Certifications (sales thresholds)
Title	Album details	US Country	US	CAN Country	Certifications (sales thresholds)
Toby Keith	Release date: April 20, 1993; Label: Mercury Records; Formats: CD, cassette	17	99	—	CAN: Gold; US: Platinum
Boomtown	Release date: September 27, 1994; Label: Polydor Nashville; Formats: CD, cassette	8	46	5	US: Platinum
Christmas to Christmas	Release date: October 17, 1995; Label: Mercury Records; Formats: CD, cassette	—	—	—	
Blue Moon	Release date: April 16, 1996; Label: A&M Records; Formats: CD, cassette	6	51	—	US: Platinum
Dream Walkin'	Release date: June 24, 1997; Label: Mercury Nashville; Formats: CD, cassette	8	107	—	US: Gold
How Do You Like Me Now?!	Release date: November 2, 1999; Label: DreamWorks Nashville; Formats: CD, cassette	9	56	8	US: Platinum
"—" denotes releases that did not chart

=== 2000s ===
Title	Album details	Peak chart positions			Certifications (sales thresholds)
Title	Album details	US Country	US	NOR	Certifications (sales thresholds)
Pull My Chain	Release date: August 28, 2001; Label: DreamWorks Nashville; Formats: CD	1	9	—	CAN: Gold; US: 2× Platinum
Unleashed	Release date: August 6, 2002; Label: DreamWorks Nashville; Formats: CD	1	1	—	CAN: Platinum; US: 4× Platinum
Shock'n Y'all	Release date: November 4, 2003; Label: DreamWorks Nashville; Formats: CD	1	1	—	CAN: Platinum; US: 4× Platinum
Honkytonk University	Release date: May 17, 2005; Label: DreamWorks Nashville; Formats: CD, music download	1	2	—	CAN: Gold; US: Platinum
White Trash with Money	Release date: April 11, 2006; Label: Show Dog Nashville; Formats: CD, music download	2	2	—	US: Platinum
Big Dog Daddy	Release date: June 12, 2007; Label: Show Dog Nashville; Formats: CD, music download	1	1	—	US: Gold
A Classic Christmas	Release date: October 23, 2007; Label: Show Dog Nashville; Formats: CD, music download	8	23	—	
That Don't Make Me a Bad Guy	Release date: October 28, 2008; Label: Show Dog Nashville; Formats: CD, music download	1	5	2	US: Gold
American Ride	Release date: October 6, 2009; Label: Show Dog Nashville; Formats: CD, music download	1	3	8	US: Gold
"—" denotes releases that did not chart

=== 2010s and 2020s ===
Title	Album details	Peak chart positions				Certifications (sales thresholds)	Sales
Title	Album details	US Country	US	CAN	UK Country	Certifications (sales thresholds)	Sales
Bullets in the Gun	Release date: October 5, 2010; Label: Show Dog-Universal Music; Formats: CD, music download	1	1	23	—	US: Gold	US: 323,000
Clancy's Tavern	Release date: October 25, 2011; Label: Show Dog-Universal Music; Formats: CD, music download	1	5	—	—	US: Platinum	US: 318,000
Hope on the Rocks	Release date: October 30, 2012; Label: Show Dog-Universal Music; Formats: CD, music download	3	6	—	—		US: 113,000
Drinks After Work	Release date: October 29, 2013; Label: Show Dog-Universal Music; Formats: CD, music download	3	7	—	—		US: 140,000
35 MPH Town	Release date: October 9, 2015; Label: Show Dog Nashville/UMGN; Formats: CD, music download	2	14	—	7		US: 29,200
Peso in My Pocket	Release date: October 15, 2021; Label: Show Dog Nashville/UMGN; Formats: LP, CD, music download	25	—	—	—		
"—" denotes releases that did not chart

== Compilation albums ==
Title	Album details	Peak chart positions			Certifications / Sales
Title	Album details	US Country	US	CAN	Certifications / Sales
Greatest Hits Volume One	Release date: October 20, 1998; Label: Mercury Nashville; Formats: CD, cassette	5	61	—	US: 2× Platinum
20th Century Masters: The Millennium Collection	Release date: April 15, 2003; Label: Mercury Nashville; Formats: CD	5	45	—	US: Gold
Greatest Hits 2	Release date: November 9, 2004; Label: DreamWorks Nashville; Formats: CD, music download	2	3	8	CAN: Platinum; US: 3× Platinum
35 Biggest Hits	Release date: May 6, 2008; Label: Show Dog Nashville/UMe; Formats: CD, music download	1	1	17	US: Platinum
Icon: Toby Keith	Release date: June 30, 2017; Label: UMe; Formats: CD, music download	—	—	95	
The Bus Songs	Release date: September 8, 2017; Label: Show Dog Nashville/UMGN; Formats: CD, music download	6	38	—	
Greatest Hits: The Show Dog Years	Release date: October 25, 2019; Label: Show Dog Nashville/UMGN; Formats: CD, music download	10	43	—	US: 23,700
13 Number Ones	Release date: October 4, 2024; Label: UMe; Formats: CD, LP, music download	—	—	—	
"—" denotes releases that did not chart

== Singles ==
=== 1990s ===
Year	Title	Peak chart positions			Certifications (sales threshold)	Album
Year	Title	US	US Country	CAN Country	Certifications (sales threshold)	Album
1993	"Should've Been a Cowboy"	93	1	1	RIAA: 4× Platinum; RMNZ: Gold	Toby Keith
1993	"He Ain't Worth Missing"	— (Note: "He Ain't Worth Missing" did not enter the Hot 100, but peaked at number 7 on Bubbling Under Hot 100 Singles.)	5	11		Toby Keith
1993	"A Little Less Talk and a Lot More Action"	—	2	25	RIAA: Gold	Toby Keith
1994	"Wish I Didn't Know Now"	—	2	17	RIAA: Gold	Toby Keith
1994	"Who's That Man"	— (Note: "Who's That Man" did not enter the Hot 100, but peaked at number 2 on Bubbling Under Hot 100 Singles.)	1	1	RIAA: Gold	Boomtown
1994	"Upstairs Downtown"	—	10	10		Boomtown
1995	"You Ain't Much Fun"	—	2	3		Boomtown
1995	"Big Ol' Truck"	—	15	10		Boomtown
1995	"Santa, I'm Right Here"	—	50	—		Christmas to Christmas
1996	"Does That Blue Moon Ever Shine on You"	— (Note: "Does That Blue Moon Ever Shine on You" did not enter the Hot 100, but peaked at number 12 on Bubbling Under Hot 100 Singles.)	2	9		Blue Moon
1996	"A Woman's Touch"	—	6	11		Blue Moon
1996	"Me Too"	—	1	6		Blue Moon
1997	"We Were in Love"	— (Note: "We Were in Love" did not enter the Hot 100, but peaked at number 16 on Bubbling Under Hot 100 Singles.)	2	2		Dream Walkin'
1997	"I'm So Happy I Can't Stop Crying" (with Sting)	84	2	4		Dream Walkin'
1998	"Dream Walkin'"	—	5	3		Dream Walkin'
1998	"Double Wide Paradise"	—	40	31		Dream Walkin'
1998	"Getcha Some"	— (Note: "Getcha Some" did not enter the Hot 100, but peaked at number 2 on Bubbling Under Hot 100 Singles.)	18	22		Greatest Hits Volume 1
1999	"If a Man Answers"	—	44	63		Greatest Hits Volume 1
1999	"When Love Fades"	—	44	58		How Do You Like Me Now?!
1999	"How Do You Like Me Now?!"	31	1	1	RIAA: 2× Platinum	How Do You Like Me Now?!
"—" denotes releases that did not chart

=== 2000s ===
Year	Title	Peak chart positions				Certifications (sales threshold)	Album
Year	Title	US	US Country	CAN	CAN Country (Note: "Country Comes to Town" chart peak according to RPM Country Tracks; all other positions according to Billboard Canada Country charts.)	Certifications (sales threshold)	Album
2000	"Country Comes to Town"	54	4	—	3		How Do You Like Me Now?!
2000	"You Shouldn't Kiss Me Like This"	32	1	—	x	RIAA: Gold	How Do You Like Me Now?!
2001	"I'm Just Talkin' About Tonight"	27	1	—	x		Pull My Chain
2001	"I Wanna Talk About Me"	28	1	—	x	RIAA: Platinum	Pull My Chain
2002	"My List"	26	1	—	x		Pull My Chain
2002	"Courtesy of the Red, White and Blue (The Angry American)"	25	1	—	x	RIAA: 5× Platinum	Unleashed
2002	"Who's Your Daddy?"	22	1	—	x	RIAA: Platinum	Unleashed
2003	"Rock You Baby"	66	13	—	x		Unleashed
2003	"Beer for My Horses" (with Willie Nelson)	22	1	—	x	RIAA: 3× Platinum; RMNZ: Gold	Unleashed
2003	"I Love This Bar"	26	1	—	x	RIAA: 3× Platinum	Shock'n Y'all
2003	"American Soldier"	28	1	—	x	RIAA: 2× Platinum	Shock'n Y'all
2004	"Whiskey Girl"	31	1	—	10	RIAA: Platinum	Shock'n Y'all
2004	"Stays in Mexico"	51	3	—	2		Greatest Hits, Vol. 2
2004	"Mockingbird" (with Krystal Keith)	—	27	—	—		Greatest Hits, Vol. 2
2005	"Honkytonk U"	61	8	—	6		Honkytonk University
2005	"As Good as I Once Was"	28	1	—	2	RIAA: 3× Platinum; RMNZ: Gold	Honkytonk University
2005	"Big Blue Note"	55	5	—	1		Honkytonk University
2005	"Get Drunk and Be Somebody"	47	3	—	3	RIAA: Gold	White Trash with Money
2006	"A Little Too Late"	53	2	—	1		White Trash with Money
2006	"Crash Here Tonight"	96	15	—	23		White Trash with Money
2007	"High Maintenance Woman"	67	3	50	1		Big Dog Daddy
2007	"Love Me If You Can"	48	1	76	14		Big Dog Daddy
2007	"Get My Drink On"	88	11	—	8		Big Dog Daddy
2008	"She's a Hottie"	71	13	85	17	RIAA: Gold	35 Biggest Hits
2008	"She Never Cried in Front of Me"	42	1	57	4	RIAA: Gold	That Don't Make Me a Bad Guy
2008	"God Love Her"	36	1	54	4	RIAA: Platinum	That Don't Make Me a Bad Guy
2009	"Lost You Anyway"	69	10	—	17		That Don't Make Me a Bad Guy
2009	"American Ride"	35	1	—	37	RIAA: Platinum	American Ride
2009	"Cryin' for Me (Wayman's Song)"	73	6	—	11	RIAA: Gold	American Ride
"—" denotes releases that did not chart "x" indicates that no relevant chart existed at the time

=== 2010s and 2020s ===
Year	Title	Peak chart positions					Certifications (sales threshold)	Album
Year	Title	US	US Country	US Country Airplay	CAN	CAN Country	Certifications (sales threshold)	Album
2010	"Every Dog Has Its Day"	— (Note: "Every Dog Has Its Day" did not enter the Hot 100, but peaked at number 2 on Bubbling Under Hot 100 Singles.)	15		91	6		American Ride
2010	"Trailerhood"	97	19		—	35	RIAA: Gold	Bullets in the Gun
2010	"Bullets in the Gun"	83	12		—	21	RIAA: Gold	Bullets in the Gun
2011	"Somewhere Else"	80	12		—	14		Bullets in the Gun
2011	"Made in America"	40	1		—	—	RIAA: Platinum	Clancy's Tavern
2011	"Red Solo Cup"	15	9		27	8	RIAA: 3× Platinum	Clancy's Tavern
2012	"Beers Ago"	52	6		54	5	RIAA: Gold	Clancy's Tavern
2012	"I Like Girls That Drink Beer"	— (Note: "I Like Girls That Drink Beer" did not enter the Hot 100, but peaked at number 2 on Bubbling Under Hot 100 Singles.)	18	17	86	30		Hope on the Rocks
2012	"Hope on the Rocks"	— (Note: "Hope on the Rocks" did not enter the Hot 100, but peaked at number 13 on Bubbling Under Hot 100 Singles.)	29	18	—	40		Hope on the Rocks
2013	"Drinks After Work"	— (Note: "Drinks After Work" did not enter the Hot 100, but peaked at number 2 on Bubbling Under Hot 100 Singles.)	28	17	95	30		Drinks After Work
2013	"Shut Up and Hold On"	—	49	48	81	49		Drinks After Work
2014	"Drunk Americans"	—	33	27	—	—		35 MPH Town
2015	"35 MPH Town"	—	—	42	—	—		35 MPH Town
2015	"Beautiful Stranger"	—	—	52	—	—		35 MPH Town
2016	"A Few More Cowboys"	—	—	47	—	—		Non-album single
2017	"Wacky Tobaccy"	—	45	—	—	—		The Bus Songs
2018	"Don't Let the Old Man In"	—	45	41	—	—		Greatest Hits: The Show Dog Years
2019	"That's Country Bro"	—	—	—	—	—		Greatest Hits: The Show Dog Years
2020	"What's Up Cuz"	—	—	—	—	—		Non-album single
2021	"Old School"	—	—	25	—	—		Peso in My Pocket
2021	"Happy Birthday America"	— (Note: "Happy Birthday America" did not enter the Hot 100, but peaked at number 15 on Bubbling Under Hot 100)	31	—	—	—		Peso in My Pocket
2022	"Oklahoma Breakdown"	—	—	53	—	—		Peso in My Pocket
2023	"Don't Let the Old Man In" (re-release)	—	22	—	—	—		Greatest Hits: The Show Dog Years
"—" denotes releases that did not chart

=== Guest singles ===
Year	Title	Artist(s)	Peak chart positions		Album
Year	Title	Artist(s)	US	US Country Airplay	Album
2001	"America the Beautiful"	Various artists	—	58	—N/a
2003	"I Can't Take You Anywhere"	Scotty Emerick	91	24	The Coast Is Clear
2004	"Midnight Rider"	Willie Nelson	—	—	It Always Will Be
2004	"I Love NASCAR" (Note: Keith was not credited for his guest vocals on "I Love NASCAR", a parody of "I Love This Bar".)	Cledus T. Judd	—	48	Bipolar and Proud
2008	"Things a Mama Don't Know"	Mica Roberts	—	55	Days You Live For
2018	"Time Flies"	Colt Ford	—	—	Love Hope Faith
2021	"The Worst Country Song of All Time"	Brantley Gilbert feat. Hardy and Toby Keith	—	32	So Help Me God
"—" denotes releases that did not chart

== Other charted songs ==
Year	Title	Peak chart positions			Album
Year	Title	US	US Country	WW	Album
2001	"Old Toy Trains"	—	57	—	A Country Christmas 2000
2002	"Beer for My Horses" (with Willie Nelson) (Note: Song charted as an album cut prior to release as a single.)	—	54	—	Unleashed
2007	"Rockin' Around the Christmas Tree"	—	44	—	A Classic Christmas
2007	"Let It Snow! Let It Snow! Let It Snow!"	—	53	—	A Classic Christmas
2007	"Winter Wonderland"	—	55	—	A Classic Christmas
2007	"The Little Drummer Boy"	—	41	—	A Classic Christmas
2008	"That Don't Make Me a Bad Guy"	—	60	—	That Don't Make Me a Bad Guy
2009	"Every Dog Has Its Day"	—	56	—	American Ride
2009	"If I Had One"	—	59	—	American Ride
2015	"Rum Is the Reason"	—	45	—	35 MPH Town
2024	"Should've Been a Cowboy" (re-entry)	—	12	193	Toby Keith
2024	"Courtesy of the Red, White and Blue (The Angry American)" (re-entry)	—	15	—	Unleashed
2024	"As Good as I Once Was" (re-entry)	—	19	—	Honkytonk University
2024	"How Do You Like Me Now?!" (re-entry)	—	23	—	How Do You Like Me Now?!
2025	"Courtesy of the Red, White and Blue (The Angry American)" (re-entry)	31	8	158	Unleashed
2026	"Courtesy of the Red, White and Blue (The Angry American)" (re-entry)	11	—	45	Unleashed

== Music videos ==
Year	Video	Director
1993	"Should've Been a Cowboy"	Marc Ball
1993	"He Ain't Worth Missing"	Michael Merriman
1994	"A Little Less Talk and a Lot More Action"	Michael Merriman
1994	"Wish I Didn't Know Now"	Marc Ball
1994	"Who's That Man"	Marc Ball
1995	"Upstairs Downtown"	Marc Ball
1995	"Big Ol' Truck"	Marc Ball
1995	"Santa, I'm Right Here"	Marc Ball
1996	"Does That Blue Moon Ever Shine on You"	Marc Ball
1997	"Me Too"	Marc Ball
1997	"We Were in Love"	Michael Salomon
1998	"Dream Walkin'"	Michael Salomon
1998	"Tired"	Michael Salomon
1998	"Getcha Some"	Michael Salomon
1999	"When Love Fades"	Michael Salomon
1999	"How Do You Like Me Now?!"	Michael Salomon
2000	"Country Comes to Town"	Keary Asmussen
2001	"You Shouldn't Kiss Me Like This"	Michael Salomon
2001	"I'm Just Talkin' About Tonight"	Michael Salomon
2001	"I Wanna Talk About Me"	Michael Salomon
2002	"My List"	Michael Salomon
2002	"Courtesy of the Red, White, & Blue (The Angry American)"	Michael Salomon
2002	"Who's Your Daddy?"	Michael Salomon
2003	"Beer for My Horses" (with Willie Nelson)	Michael Salomon
2003	"I Love This Bar"	Michael Salomon
2003	"American Soldier"	Michael Salomon
2004	"Whiskey Girl"	Michael Salomon
2004	"Stays in Mexico"	Michael Salomon
2005	"Honkytonk U"	Michael Salomon
2005	"As Good as I Once Was"	Michael Salomon
2005	"Big Blue Note"	Michael Salomon
2006	"Get Drunk and Be Somebody"	Michael Salomon
2006	"A Little Too Late"	Michael Salomon
2006	"Crash Here Tonight"	Michael Salomon
2007	"High Maintenance Woman"	Michael Salomon
2007	"Love Me If You Can"	Michael Salomon
2007	"Go Tell It on the Mountain" (with Jewel)	Michael Salomon
2008	"She's a Hottie" (Live from the 2008 CMT Music Awards)	Alan Carter
2008	"God Love Her"	Michael Salomon
2009	"American Ride"	Michael Salomon
2009	"Cryin' for Me (Wayman's Song)"	Michael Salomon
2010	"Trailerhood"	Michael Salomon
2010	"Bullets in the Gun"	Michael Salomon
2011	"Made in America"	Michael Salomon
2011	"Red Solo Cup"	Michael Salomon
2011	"Red Solo Cup" (Holiday version)	Michael Salomon
2012	"I Like Girls That Drink Beer"	Michael Salomon
2012	"Hope on the Rocks"	Michael Salomon
2014	"Drunk Americans"	Michael Salomon
2017	"Wacky Tobaccy"	
2017	"Shitty Golfer"	
2018	"Time Flies" (with Colt Ford)	
2018	"Don't Let the Old Man In"	
2019	"That's Country Bro"	

=== Guest appearances ===
Year	Video	Director
2001	"America the Beautiful" (Various)	Marc Ball
2004	"Hey, Good Lookin'" (with Jimmy Buffett, Clint Black, Kenny Chesney, Alan Jackson and George Strait)	Trey Fanjoy/Stan Kellam
2004	"I Love NASCAR" (with Cledus T. Judd)	Shaun Silva
2013	"Too Drunk to Karaoke" (with Jimmy Buffett)	Michael Salomon
2021	"The Worst Country Song of All Time" (with Brantley Gilbert and Hardy)	Wes Edwards
