= 35 Biggest Hits =

Greatest hits album by Toby Keith
- Released: May 6, 2008
- Genre: Country
- Length: 129:31
- Label: Show Dog/UMe
- Producer: Various original producers

Toby Keith chronology
A Classic Christmas (2007)	35 Biggest Hits (2008)	That Don't Make Me a Bad Guy (2008)

Singles from 35 Biggest Hits
- 1. "She's a Hottie" Released: March 4, 2008

Professional ratings
Review scores
Source	Rating
AllMusic	5/5 stars
Country Weekly	3/5 stars

35 Biggest Hits is a two-disc greatest hits album from American country music artist Toby Keith. It was released on May 6, 2008. The album comprises 34 previously recorded tracks from Keith's previous studio albums, as well as the newly recorded track "She's a Hottie", which was released to radio in early 2008.

This compilation is the first to span Keith's entire career; it was able to do so because Universal Music Group Nashville owned (either outright or through distribution) the rights to his entire catalog. The album has sold 1,210,900 copies in the United States as of January 2017.

== Commercial performance ==
35 Biggest Hits debuted at number two on the Billboard 200 albums chart, selling 103,000 copies in the first week of release. The album sold 66,000 album-equivalent units (11,000 in pure album sales) in the week following Keith's death in February 2024, thus allowing the album to re-enter the Billboard 200 at number one; this makes the album Keith's fifth number one on the chart.

== Track listing ==
=== Disc 1 ===
No.	Title	Writer(s)	Length
1.	"Should've Been a Cowboy"	Toby Keith	3:30
2.	"He Ain't Worth Missing"	Keith	3:08
3.	"A Little Less Talk and a Lot More Action"	Keith Hinton, Jimmy Alan Stewart	2:49
4.	"Wish I Didn't Know Now"	Keith	3:26
5.	"Who's That Man" (single version)	Keith	3:32
6.	"Upstairs Downtown"	Keith, Carl Goff Jr.	4:26
7.	"You Ain't Much Fun"	Keith, Goff Jr.	2:27
8.	"Big Ol' Truck"	Keith	3:42
9.	"Does That Blue Moon Ever Shine on You"	Keith	3:50
10.	"A Woman's Touch"	Keith, Wayne Perry	5:35
11.	"Me Too"	Keith, Chuck Cannon	3:52
12.	"We Were in Love"	Cannon, Allen Shamblin	4:19
13.	"I'm So Happy I Can't Stop Crying" (duet with Sting)	Sting	4:01
14.	"Dream Walkin'"	Keith, Cannon	3:56
15.	"Getcha Some"	Keith, Cannon	3:16
16.	"How Do You Like Me Now?!"	Keith, Cannon	3:26
17.	"Country Comes to Town"	Keith	3:38
18.	"You Shouldn't Kiss Me Like This"	Keith	3:40

=== Disc 2 ===
No.	Title	Writer(s)	Length
1.	"I'm Just Talkin' About Tonight"	Keith, Scotty Emerick	2:46
2.	"I Wanna Talk About Me"	Bobby Braddock	3:04
3.	"My List"	Rand Bishop, Tim James	3:21
4.	"Courtesy of the Red, White, & Blue (The Angry American)"	Keith	3:16
5.	"Who's Your Daddy?"	Keith	3:59
6.	"Beer for My Horses" (duet with Willie Nelson)	Keith, Emerick	3:32
7.	"I Love This Bar"	Keith, Emerick	5:35
8.	"American Soldier"	Keith, Cannon	4:23
9.	"Whiskey Girl"	Keith, Emerick	3:59
10.	"Stays in Mexico"	Keith	3:36
11.	"Mockingbird" (duet with daughter Krystal)	Inez Foxx, Charlie Foxx	3:32
12.	"Honkytonk U"	Keith	3:35
13.	"As Good as I Once Was"	Keith, Emerick	3:49
14.	"Big Blue Note"	Keith, Emerick	2:58
15.	"Get Drunk and Be Somebody"	Keith, Emerick	2:58
16.	"A Little Too Late"	Keith, Emerick, Dean Dillon	4:06
17.	"She's a Hottie" (new recorded track)	Keith, Bobby Pinson	3:07

== Charts ==
=== Weekly charts ===
2008 weekly chart performance for 35 Biggest Hits
Chart (2008)	Peak position
Canadian Albums (Billboard)	17
US Billboard 200	2
US Top Country Albums (Billboard)	1

2014 weekly chart performance for 35 Biggest Hits
Chart (2014)	Peak position
Australian Albums (ARIA)	19

2024 weekly chart performance for 35 Biggest Hits
Chart (2024)	Peak position
US Billboard 200	1

=== Year-end charts ===
Chart (2008)	Position
US Billboard 200	82
US Top Country Albums (Billboard)	18
Chart (2009)	Position
US Billboard 200	162
US Top Country Albums (Billboard)	31
Chart (2017)	Position
US Top Country Albums (Billboard)	83
Chart (2019)	Position
US Top Country Albums (Billboard)	83
Chart (2020)	Position
US Top Country Albums (Billboard)	75
Chart (2021)	Position
US Top Country Albums (Billboard)	22
Chart (2022)	Position
US Top Country Albums (Billboard)	20
Chart (2023)	Position
US Top Country Albums (Billboard)	31
Chart (2024)	Position
US Billboard 200	88
US Top Country Albums (Billboard)	16
Chart (2025)	Position
US Billboard 200	109
US Top Country Albums (Billboard)	20

== Certifications ==
Certifications for 35 Biggest Hits
Region	Certification	Certified units/sales
United Kingdom (BPI)	Silver	60,000^{‡}
United States (RIAA)	Platinum	1,000,000^{^}
^{^} Shipments figures based on certification alone.
