= 20th Century Masters – The Millennium Collection: The Best of Toby Keith =

Greatest hits album by Toby Keith
- Released: April 15, 2003
- Genre: Country
- Length: 45:36
- Label: Mercury
- Producer: Nelson Larkin; Harold Shedd; James Stroud; Toby Keith

Toby Keith chronology
Unleashed (2002)	20th Century Masters – The Millennium Collection: The Best of Toby Keith (2003)	Shock'n Y'all (2003)

20th Century Masters – The Millennium Collection: The Best of Toby Keith is a compilation album of American country music artist Toby Keith's greatest hits. The album is part of a 20th Century Masters collection of similar albums. It features songs from his first four albums, all of which were released through Mercury Records.

== Track listing ==
No.	Title	Writer(s)	Length
1.	"Should've Been a Cowboy"	Toby Keith	3:29
2.	"He Ain't Worth Missing"	Keith	3:04
3.	"A Little Less Talk and a Lot More Action"	Keith Hinton, Alan Stewart	2:49
4.	"Wish I Didn't Know Now"	Keith	3:25
5.	"Who's That Man"	Keith	4:54
6.	"You Ain't Much Fun"	Keith, Carl Goff Jr.	2:26
7.	"Does That Blue Moon Ever Shine on You"	Keith	3:49
8.	"A Woman's Touch"	Keith, Wayne Perry	5:34
9.	"Me Too"	Keith, Chuck Cannon	3:52
10.	"I'm So Happy I Can't Stop Crying" (with Sting)	Sting	4:00
11.	"We Were in Love"	Cannon, Allen Shamblin	4:19
12.	"Dream Walkin'"	Keith, Cannon	3:55

== Critical reception ==
Professional ratings
Review scores
Source	Rating
Allmusic	4.5/5 stars

20th Century Masters – The Millennium Collection: The Best of Toby Keith received four-and-a-half out of five stars from Stephen Thomas Erlewine of Allmusic. In his review, Erlewine praises the album as "a near-ideal summary of Keith's Mercury recordings as well as a fine introduction to the man himself."

== Chart performance ==
20th Century Masters – The Millennium Collection: The Best of Toby Keith peaked at number 5 on the U.S. Billboard Top Country Albums chart. It also reached number 45 on the all-genre Billboard 200.

=== Weekly charts ===
Chart (2003)	Peak position
US Billboard 200	45
US Top Country Albums (Billboard)	5

=== Year-end charts ===
Chart (2003)	Position
US Top Country Albums (Billboard)	49
Chart (2004)	Position
US Top Country Albums (Billboard)	54

== Sales and certifications ==
20th Century Masters – The Millennium Collection: The Best of Toby Keith was certified Gold by the RIAA in 2004 for shipments of 500,000 copies. As of August 2013, the album has sold 1,008,000 copies in the US.

Region	Certification	Certified units/sales
United States (RIAA)	Gold	1,008,000
