= A Classic Christmas (Toby Keith album) =

Studio album by Toby Keith
- Released: October 16, 2007
- Genres: Country, Christmas
- Length: 63:28
- Label: Show Dog Nashville
- Producers: Toby Keith; Randy Scruggs

Toby Keith chronology
Big Dog Daddy (2007)	A Classic Christmas (2007)	35 Biggest Hits (2008)

Professional ratings
Review scores
Source	Rating
AllMusic	3.5/5 stars

A Classic Christmas is the thirteenth studio album and second Christmas album from American country music singer-songwriter Toby Keith. Released in 2007, the album comprises two discs. While his previous Christmas album, 1995's Christmas to Christmas, was composed of original songs, Keith recorded 20 Christmas standards for A Classic Christmas.

== Critical reception ==
Stephen Thomas Erlewine of AllMusic writes "a holiday album of this size may seem like overkill, but this isn't one sprawling, unedited session: it's two distinct albums, the first containing secular seasonal standards, the second religious-themed carols." and finishes the review with "and both are solid holiday albums."

Andrew W. Griffin of reddirtreport.com writes in his review, "All in all, A Toby Keith Classic Christmas is the sort of holiday album all Oklahomans should add to their collection."

CMT reviewed the album and said, "Singing yuletide favorites in front of an intimate Nashville audience, superstar Toby Keith delivers a scaled down performance reminiscent of a family gathering with a visit from special guest, Jewel."

CBS News briefly touched on the album and mentioned "On The Early Show Friday, Keith agreed with the assessment of co-anchor Hannah Storm that the new CD is very traditional."

== Track listing ==
=== Disc One ===
No.	Title	Writer(s)	Length
1.	"Have Yourself a Merry Little Christmas"	Hugh Martin; Ralph Blane	4:17
2.	"Let It Snow! Let It Snow! Let It Snow!"	Sammy Cahn; Jule Styne	2:38
3.	"Winter Wonderland"	Felix Bernard; Richard B. Smith	2:41
4.	"Silver Bells"	Jay Livingston; Ray Evans	2:45
5.	"I'll Be Home for Christmas"	Walter Kent; Kim Gannon; Buck Ram	3:02
6.	"Rockin' Around the Christmas Tree"	Johnny Marks	2:24
7.	"The Christmas Song"	Mel Tormé; Bob Wells	3:34
8.	"White Christmas"	Irving Berlin	2:56
9.	"Frosty the Snowman"	Walter E. Rollins; Steve Nelson	4:01
10.	"Please Come Home for Christmas"	Charles Brown; Gene Redd	3:04
Total length:			31:22

=== Disc Two ===
No.	Title	Writer(s)	Length
1.	"Little Drummer Boy"	Katherine Kennicott Davis; Harry Simeone; Henry Onorati	3:45
2.	"Go Tell It on the Mountain"	Traditional	3:18
3.	"The First Noel"	Traditional	3:10
4.	"O Come All Ye Faithful"	John Francis Wade	2:49
5.	"Silent Night"	Josef Mohr; Franz Gruber	4:31
6.	"Away in a Manger"	Traditional	3:32
7.	"We Three Kings"	John Henry Hopkins Jr.	2:26
8.	"O Little Town of Bethlehem"	Phillips Brooks	3:42
9.	"God Rest Ye Merry, Gentlemen"	Traditional	2:52
10.	"Joy to the World"	George Frideric Handel; Isaac Watts	2:01
Total length:			32:06

== Personnel ==
- Lisa Cochran – background vocals
- Chad Cromwell – drums, percussion
- John Hobbs – keyboards
- Rob Ickes – dobro
- Toby Keith – acoustic guitar, lead vocals
- Dave Pomeroy – bass guitar
- Mica Roberts – background vocals
- John Wesley Ryles – background vocals
- Randy Scruggs – bouzouki, 12-string guitar, acoustic guitar
- Harry Stinson – background vocals
- Biff Watson – acoustic guitar
- Jonathan Yudkin – string bass, cello, celtic harp, octophone, viola, violin, xylophone

== Charts ==
=== Weekly charts ===
Chart (2007)	Peak position
US Billboard 200	23
US Top Country Albums (Billboard)	8
US Top Holiday Albums (Billboard)	2

=== Year-end charts ===
Chart (2008)	Position
US Billboard 200	174
US Top Country Albums (Billboard)	29
