= The Bus Songs =

Compilation album by Toby Keith
- Released: September 8, 2017
- Studio: Sound Emporium (Nashville, Tennessee); QUAD/Sienna Studios; Blackbird; Ocean Way; Riverbend Music Center
- Genre: Country
- Length: 42:02
- Label: Show Dog Nashville
- Producer: Toby Keith

Toby Keith chronology
35 MPH Town (2015)	The Bus Songs (2017)	Greatest Hits: The Show Dog Years (2019)

Singles from The Bus Songs
- 1. "Wacky Tobaccy" Released: June 23, 2017

The Bus Songs is a compilation album from American country music artist Toby Keith. The album was announced July 14, 2017, and was released September 8, 2017. It is a combination of new and older songs written by Keith. The album contains twelve songs: two new, five re-recorded, and five previously released songs. The new songs on the album are "Shitty Golfer" and "Wacky Tobaccy". The songs "Runnin' Block", "Hell No", "The Critic", "Ballad of Balad", and "Weed with Willie" have been re-recorded and are referred to as "fresh takes on old favorites" by Rolling Stone magazine.

== Background ==
According to CMT News, the album gets its title from the late night recording sessions Keith has had on his tour bus. The album has been said to be focused more towards the adult fans of Keith and not likely to be broadcast on mainstream radio due to the "adult humor, drinking and self-deprecation" present within the songs included in the album.

The album was announced on July 14, 2017. Prior to the announcement of the album, on June 23, 2017, Toby released the music video of the track "Wacky Tobaccy" – a song about cannabis – on his YouTube channel. The music video for "Wacky Tobaccy" was filmed on Keith's tour bus and contained a cameo appearance of Willie Nelson smoking cannabis. Rolling Stone called the music video "suitably silly," containing video of a jam session in Toby's tour bus "surrounded by posters of Jamaica and smoky looking graphics." On October 19, 2017 a promotional video for "Shitty Golfer" was added to Keith's official Vevo account.

== Commercial performance ==
The album debuted at No. 6 on Top Country Albums, which is Keith's 23rd Top 10 album on the chart, with 12,000 copies sold. It sold a further 3,600 copies the following week. It has sold 29,700 copies in the United States as of January 2018.

== Track listing ==
All tracks are written by Toby Keith, with additional co-writers as noted.

No.	Title	Writer(s)	Length
1.	"Shitty Golfer"		2:16
2.	"Wacky Tobaccy"	Scotty Emerick	3:03
3.	"Runnin' Block"	Emerick	3:59
4.	"Brand New Bow"		3:10
5.	"Call a Marine"	Bobby Pinson	3:17
6.	"Hell No"	Emerick	3:18
7.	"The Critic"		3:37
8.	"The Size I Wear"	Rivers Rutherford	3:01
9.	"Ballad of Balad"		3:50
10.	"Rum Is the Reason"	Emerick	3:18
11.	"Weed with Willie" (live)	Emerick	4:43
12.	"Get Out of My Car" (live)	Pinson	4:30

- "Brand New Bow", "Hell No", and the original version of "Runnin' Block" appeared on the 2006 album White Trash with Money.
- "Call a Marine" appeared on the deluxe edition of the 2013 album Drinks After Work.
- The original version of "The Critic" and the original version of "Weed with Willie" appeared on the 2003 album Shock'n Y'all.
- "The Size I Wear" appeared on the 2012 album Hope on the Rocks.
- "Ballad of Balad" appeared on the 2009 album American Ride.
- "Rum Is the Reason" appeared on the 2015 album 35 MPH Town.
- The original studio version of "Get Out of My Car" appeared on the 2010 album Bullets in the Gun, the live version appeared on the deluxe edition of Hope on the Rocks.

== Personnel ==
The following musicians performed on the album:

- Greg Barnhill – background vocals
- Josh Bertrand – pedal steel guitar
- Bruce Bouton – pedal steel guitar
- Carl Murr – trombone
- Dave Cohen – accordion, Hammond B-3 organ, piano, Wurlitzer
- Perry Coleman – background vocals
- J.T. Corenflos – electric guitar
- Chad Cromwell – drums
- Eric Darken – percussion
- Roman Dudok – saxophone
- Rich Eckhardt – electric guitar, background vocals
- Scotty Emerick – acoustic guitar, finger snaps, background vocals
- Joey Floyd – acoustic guitar, background vocals
- Chuck Goff – bass guitar
- Dink Cook – bass guitar
- Kevin "Swine" Grantt – bass guitar
- Kenny Greenberg – electric guitar
- Robert Greenidge – steel drums
- Doyle Grisham – pedal steel guitar
- Roger Guth – drums
- Rob Hajacos – fiddle
- Aubrey Haynie – fiddle
- The Hogliners – background vocals
- Jay Jennings – trumpet
- Charlie Judge – Hammond B-3 organ, Wurlitzer
- Toby Keith – acoustic guitar, lead vocals
- Mills Logan – programming
- Brent Mason – electric guitar
- Rex Mauney – piano, background vocals
- Jim Mayer – bass guitar
- Dave McAfee – drums
- Mac McAnally – acoustic guitar, background vocals
- Chris McHugh – drums
- Rob McNelley – electric guitar
- Miles McPherson – drums
- Steve Nathan – Hammond B-3 organ, piano, Wurlitzer
- Russ Pahl – Dobro, pedal steel guitar
- Bobby Pinson – background vocals
- Lucy Pinson – background vocals, backflips
- Danny Rader – acoustic guitar
- Mica Roberts – background vocals
- David Santos – bass guitar
- Randy Scruggs – banjo
- Steve Sheehan – acoustic guitar
- Jimmie Lee Sloas – bass guitar
- Bobby Terry – acoustic guitar
- The TKokies – background vocals
- Ilya Toshinsky – acoustic guitar

== Charts ==
Chart (2017)	Peak position
US Billboard 200	38
US Top Country Albums (Billboard)	6
