= Don't Let the Old Man In =

2018 song by Toby Keith

Single by Toby Keith

from the album Greatest Hits: The Show Dog Years
- Released: December 7, 2018
- Genre: Country
- Length: 2:54
- Label: Show Dog-Universal Music
- Songwriter: Toby Keith
- Producers: Arturo Buenahora Jr.; Toby Keith; F. Reid Shippen

Toby Keith singles chronology
"Wacky Tobaccy" (2017)	"Don't Let the Old Man In" (2018)	"That's Country Bro" (2019)

"Don't Let the Old Man In" is a song written and recorded by American country music singer Toby Keith. It appears on his 2019 compilation album Greatest Hits: The Show Dog Years, and is also featured in the 2018 film The Mule.

== History ==
Keith met actor-director Clint Eastwood at a charity golf tournament in Pebble Beach, California, in 2018. At the time, Eastwood was working on his film The Mule. Keith told Billboard that he was surprised by the energy Eastwood seemed to have despite being 88 years old at the time, at which point Eastwood remarked, "I don't let the old man in". Keith liked this line and immediately wrote the song, which is a ballad about a man dealing with his increasing age. He was also inspired by an anecdote told to him by his grandmother, about a friend of hers who did not know her exact age due to her not owning a birth certificate. Billboard writer Cathy Applefield Olson described the song as "at once emotionally resigned and quietly triumphant". Olson also thought that the song's central theme of old age was appropriate to the plot line of The Mule, which is about an elderly person becoming a drug courier. Soon after writing, Keith recorded a demo which he submitted to Eastwood. Keith was sick the day he recorded the demo, creating a "raspy, sleepy, tired, sick vocal". Eastwood liked the recording and decided to put it in The Mule, feeling that the raspy delivery fit the mood of the song and the movie.

Keith also produced a music video for the song, directed by Michael Salomon.

On September 28, 2023, five years after the song's original release, Keith performed the song at the 2023 People's Choice Country Awards after being awarded the Country Icon award. The performance was one of his first following his diagnosis with stomach cancer the previous year. Following the performance, the song was reissued as a single to country radio with an impact date of October 30, 2023.

Following Keith's death in February 2024, a tribute special entitled Toby Keith: American Icon was put together to celebrate his career with performances of his hit songs by other country music recording artists. It aired on August 28, 2024, and featured his youngest daughter, Krystal Keith, performing the song.

== Chart performance ==
"Don't Let the Old Man in" debuted and spent one week at number 45 on the Hot Country Songs chart for the week of December 22, 2018. After Keith's death on February 5, 2024, the song would re-enter the Hot Country Songs chart, reaching a new peak at number 22 for the week of February 17, 2024. It was one of five Toby Keith songs to re-enter the chart that week.

2018–2019 weekly chart performance for "Don't Let the Old Man In"
Chart (2018–2019)	Peak position
US Country Airplay (Billboard)	41
US Hot Country Songs (Billboard)	45

2023–2024 weekly chart performance for "Don't Let the Old Man In"
Chart (2023–2024)	Peak position
US Digital Song Sales (Billboard)	3
US Hot Country Songs (Billboard)	22
