= Greatest Hits: The Show Dog Years =

Greatest hits album by Toby Keith
- Released: October 25, 2019
- Genre: Country
- Length: 55:38
- Label: Show Dog Nashville
- Producer: Toby Keith, Bobby Pinson, F. Reid Shippen

Toby Keith chronology
The Bus Songs (2017)	Greatest Hits: The Show Dog Years (2019)	Peso in My Pocket (2021)

Singles from Greatest Hits: The Show Dog Years
- 1. "Don't Let the Old Man In" Released: December 7, 2018; 2. "That's Country Bro" Released: May 3, 2019

Greatest Hits: The Show Dog Years is the fourth greatest hits album by American country music artist Toby Keith. It was released on October 25, 2019, via Show Dog Nashville. It features two new tracks, "That's Country Bro" and "Back in the 405", in addition to "Don't Let the Old Man In", a song previously recorded in 2018 for the Clint Eastwood film The Mule.

== Track listing ==
Greatest Hits: The Show Dog Years track listing
No.	Title	Writer(s)	Length
1.	"That's Country Bro"	Toby Keith; Bobby Pinson	2:34
2.	"Made in America"	Keith; Pinson; Scott Reeves	3:16
3.	"Beers Ago"	Keith; Pinson	3:28
4.	"Red Solo Cup"	Brett Beavers; Jim Beavers; Brad Warren; Brett Warren	3:45
5.	"American Ride"	Dave Pahanish; Joe West	2:49
6.	"Don't Let the Old Man In"	Keith	2:54
7.	"God Love Her"	Keith; Vicky McGehee	3:37
8.	"Hope on the Rocks"	Keith	3:42
9.	"Trailerhood"	Keith	2:55
10.	"Cryin' for Me (Wayman's Song)"	Keith	4:47
11.	"She Never Cried in Front of Me"	Keith; Pinson	4:03
12.	"High Maintenance Woman"	Keith; Danny Simpson; Tim Wilson	3:24
13.	"Love Me If You Can"	Chris Wallin; Craig Wiseman	3:38
14.	"Lost You Anyway"	Keith; Pinson	3:38
15.	"Back in the 405"	Keith; Colt Ford	3:41
16.	"American Ride" (official remix)	Pahanish; West	3:27

== Personnel ==
Personnel as listed on new tracks (1, 6 and 15).

- Jimmy Bowland – saxophone (track 15)
- Perry Coleman – background vocals (track 1)
- Nickie Conley – background vocals (track 15)
- Mark Douthit – saxophone (track 15)
- Scotty Emerick – acoustic guitar (track 6)
- Jason Eskridge – background vocals (track 15)
- Ian Fitchuk – bass guitar (track 6), drums (track 6)
- Mike Haynes – trumpet (track 15)
- Evan Hutchings – drums (tracks 1, 15)
- Jeff Hyde – acoustic guitar (tracks 1, 15)
- Toby Keith – lead vocals
- Tim Lauer – keyboards (track 6)
- Sam Levine – saxophone (track 15)
- Mills Logan – percussion (track 1)
- Brent Mason – electric guitar (track 1)
- Mac McAnally – acoustic guitar (tracks 6, 15), piano (track 6)
- Maureen Murphy – background vocals (track 15)
- Steve Patrick – trumpet (track 15)
- Justin Ostrander – electric guitar (track 15)
- Russ Pahl – steel guitar (track 1)
- Matt Rollings – piano (tracks 6, 15), Wurlitzer (track 15)
- F. Reid Shippen – percussion, programming (track 15)
- Jimmie Lee Sloas – bass guitar (tracks 1, 15)
- Bergen White – brass arrangements (track 15)

== Charts ==
Chart performance for Greatest Hits: The Show Dog Years
Chart (2019–2024)	Peak position
US Billboard 200	43
US Top Country Albums (Billboard)	10
