= Beer for My Horses (film) =

- Theatrical release poster
- Directed by: Michael Salomon
- Written by: Rodney Carrington; Toby Keith; W.T. Scrags
- Produced by: Toby Keith; Donald Zuckerman
- Starring: Toby Keith; Rodney Carrington; Willie Nelson; Ted Nugent; Barry Corbin; Claire Forlani; Curtis Armstrong; Tom Skerritt
- Cinematography: Paul Elliott
- Edited by: Paul Trejo
- Production companies: CMT Films; Show Dog Productions
- Distributed by: Roadside Attractions
- Release date: August 8, 2008
- Running time: 86 minutes
- Country: United States
- Language: English
- Budget: $10 million
- Box office: $667,000

Beer for My Horses is a 2008 American comedy film starring, co-written, and co-produced by country music entertainer Toby Keith (in his only film as screenwriter and producer), which is based on his song by the same name. The film was co-written by Keith and Rodney Carrington in his film writing debut (who also stars in the film) and directed by Michael Salomon in his directional film debut, who has directed numerous music videos for Keith.

The film was shot in and around Las Vegas, New Mexico and was released on August 8, 2008 to overwhelmingly negative reviews seeing a rare 0% critic score on Rotten Tomatoes. It made about $667,000 in its limited box office release.

== Plot ==
Best friends Joe Bill "Rack" Racklin (Toby Keith) and Lonnie Freeman (Rodney Carrington) are deputy sheriffs in the small town of Mangum, Oklahoma, who enjoy pig hunting and drinking at the local bar, the Thirsty Monkey.

After his girlfriend Cammie (Gina Gershon) leaves him when he does not make time for her due to his job and hanging out with friends, Rack finds out that his old flame Annie Streets (Claire Forlani) has returned home from Chicago to care for her sick mother. Rack, Lonnie, and their friend and fellow deputy Skunk Tarver (Ted Nugent) arrest three local criminals and a Mexican drug lord, Tito Garza (Greg Serano), for stealing fertilizer that is intended to make methamphetamine. Garza is scheduled to be turned over to the FBI for federal charges when Annie mysteriously disappears after a date with Rack, who discovers that Annie has been kidnapped by Tito's older brother, Manuel Garza (Carlos Sanz), who runs a large Mexican drug cartel. Manuel contacts the police and demands that Tito be returned to him in Santa Luna, Mexico, or he will kill Annie.

Despite being taken off the case by their boss, Sheriff Landry (Tom Skerritt), Rack, Lonnie, and Skunk break Tito out of his jail cell and take him to Mexico. Along the way, they approach a young hooker named Harveyetta and are helped by a group of circus entertainers led by Charlie (Willie Nelson), who gives them a jug of homemade whiskey known as "circus jolly".

Once in Mexico, after dropping Harveyetta off, they engage in a gunfight with Garza's men, and it is revealed that Annie's rich and powerful stepfather, Buck Baker (Barry Corbin), is Garza's partner, and his United Farm Enterprises is the base for the largest methamphetamine operation in Oklahoma. Baker reveals that the local district attorney, Levin (Curtis Armstrong), is corrupt and that he has been giving Annie's mother "goofy juice" to make her appear to have Alzheimer's disease.

With the help of former criminal Johnny Franks, who is revealed to be undercover FBI agent Levon Spurlock, Rack kills Buck and rescues Annie. Rack, Lonnie, and Skunk turn Manuel and Tito over to the FBI in Oklahoma City and return to Mangum. There they are cheered by the local crows at the Thirsty Monkey. Landry berates them for disobeying orders, but does not arrest them, and everyone toasts "whiskey for my men, beer for my horses" while serving "circus jolly".

== Cast ==
- Toby Keith as Joe Bill "Rack" Racklin
- Rodney Carrington as Lonnie Luther Freeman
- Ted Nugent as Skunk Tarver
- Barry Corbin as Buck Baker
- Greg Serano as Tito Garza
- Carlos Sanz as Manuel Garza
- Claire Forlani as Annie Streets
- Curtis Armstrong as D.A. Levin
- Tom Skerritt as Sheriff Wilson Landry
- Brit Morgan as Harveyetta
- Willie Nelson as Charlie
- Chris Browning as Deputy Stippens
- Mac Davis as Reverend J.D. Parker
- Keith Jardine as Jay Boy Simpson
- Gina Gershon as Cammie
- David Allan Coe as Gypsy
- Mel Tillis as Bob the plumber
- Cledus T. Judd as Doughnut Shop employee

== Release and reception ==
=== Box office ===
The film made $800,000 in its limited domestic release, with a possible worldwide gross of $1,500,000. The film was released to 450 theaters in 2008. It made $235,000 in its opening weekend, and stayed in theaters for four weeks; it made a total of $895,000.

=== Home media ===
The film is available on DVD and Blu-Ray, and has made $27.5 million in DVD sales, and $14 million in Blu-Ray, for a total of $42.5 million in home video sales.

=== Critical reception ===
The film holds a rating of 0% on review aggregator Rotten Tomatoes, based on 8 critics.

== Soundtrack ==
Beer for My Horses

Soundtrack album by Various artists
- Released: August 12, 2008
- Genre: Country, Rock
- Label: Show Dog Nashville
- Producer: Toby Keith, Donald Zuckerman

Professional ratings
Review scores
Source	Rating
AllMusic	3/5 stars

Track	Song title	Performer	Writer	Length
1	"Beer for My Horses"	Toby Keith and Willie Nelson	Keith, Scotty Emerick	3:30
2	"Off the Hillbilly Hook"	Trailer Choir	Butter, Big Vinny, Jewels Hanson	3:11
3	"Cat Scratch Fever"	Ted Nugent	Nugent	3:38
4	"La Di Da"	Gina Gershon	Gershon, Linda Perry	3:25
5	"Choctaw Bingo"	James McMurtry	McMurtry	8:45
6	"No Más Cerveza"	Mac Davis	Davis	3:35
7	"Stranglehold"	Ted Nugent	Nugent	8:23
8	"Burning Memories"	Mel Tillis	Tillis, Wayne Walker	3:15
9	"Song of Blue"	Carter's Chord	Emily Robertson	3:45
10	"Show Them to Me"	Rodney Carrington	Mark Gross	3:53
11	"If That Ain't Country, Part 2"	David Allan Coe	Coe	4:30
12	"Let's Get Trashed"	Toby Keith and Mica Roberts	Jessi Alexander, Jon Randall	2:52
