= Peso in My Pocket =

Studio album by Toby Keith
- Released: October 15, 2021
- Genre: Country
- Length: 37:30
- Label: Show Dog-Universal Music
- Producer: Toby Keith; Kenny Greenberg

Toby Keith chronology
Greatest Hits: The Show Dog Years (2019)	Peso in My Pocket (2021)

Singles from Peso in My Pocket
- 1. "Old School" Released: June 25, 2021; 2. "Oklahoma Breakdown" Released: September 26, 2022

Peso in My Pocket is the twenty-first and final studio album by American country music artist Toby Keith, released on October 15, 2021, by Show Dog-Universal Music. It is Keith's first new studio album since 35 MPH Town in 2015, marking the longest gap between two albums and is his final album to be released before his death in February 2024 from stomach cancer (which he was diagnosed with not long before its release).

== Content ==
The album was Keith's first new studio album since 35 MPH Town in 2015. He began writing for the album at a house he owned in Cabo San Lucas, Mexico, during the COVID-19 pandemic. After receiving calls for new music from "radio honchos", he decided to compile a new album. The album's lead single is "Old School", co-written by country singer Maren Morris and her then-husband, Ryan Hurd. It was Keith's final Top 40 country hit to date.

== Critical reception ==
The album received four out of five stars from AllMusic, whose reviewer Stephen Thomas Erlewine wrote that "Lively, funny, and brawny in a way he hasn't been since his hot streak in the 2000s, Peso in My Pocket is filled with songs so lean that it takes a moment to realize that Keith covers a lot of musical ground here."

== Track listing ==
All tracks are written by Toby Keith except where noted.

Peso in My Pocket track listing
No.	Title	Writer(s)	Length
1.	"Oklahoma Breakdown"	Mike Hosty	3:31
2.	"Peso in My Pocket"		2:45
3.	"Old School"	Ryan Hurd; Maren Morris; Brett Tyler	3:13
4.	"Old Me Better"	Kevin R. Moore; John Lewis Parker	3:51
5.	"Days I Shoulda Died"	Jessie Jo Dillon; Brad Warren; Brett Warren	3:17
6.	"Growing Up Is a Bitch"	Keith; Sammy Hagar	4:13
7.	"She's Drinkin' Again"		4:43
8.	"Thunderbird"		3:58
9.	"Take a Look at My Heart"	John Mellencamp; John Prine	3:41
10.	"Happy Birthday America"		4:18
Total length:			37:30

== Personnel ==
- Roy Agee – trombone (tracks 4, 7)
- Greg Barnhill – background vocals (tracks 1, 7, 8)
- Jimmy Carter – bass guitar (tracks 3, 6)
- Vinnie Ciesielski – trumpet (track 7)
- Evan Cobb – baritone saxophone (track 7), tenor saxophone (track 7)
- Perry Coleman – background vocals (tracks 3, 5, 6, 9)
- Joanna Cotten – background vocals (track 10)
- Chad Cromwell – drums (tracks 1, 4, 8, 10)
- Kris Donegan – acoustic guitar (track 6), electric guitar (track 6)
- Dan Dugmore – steel guitar (all tracks except 3 and 6)
- Fred Eltringham – drums (tracks 2, 5, 7), percussion (track 4)
- LaShanda Evans – background vocals (track 4)
- Tim Galloway – acoustic guitar (tracks 4, 10)
- Kenny Greenberg – acoustic guitar (tracks 2, 8–10), electric guitar (all tracks except 2 and 8)
- Tania Hancheroff – background vocals (tracks 1, 3, 4)
- Mike Hosty – slide guitar (track 1)
- David Huff – programming (track 6)
- Terrell Hunt – background vocals (track 4)
- Evan Hutchings – drums (tracks 3, 6), programming (track 3)
- Toby Keith – lead vocals (all tracks)
- Mills Logan – background vocals (track 2)
- Pat McGrath – acoustic guitar (track 5)
- Rob McNelley – acoustic guitar (track 7), electric guitar (tracks 1, 2, 4, 7–10)
- Jamie McLaughlin – programming (track 1)
- Keb' Mo' – resonator guitar (track 4)
- Michael Rhodes – bass guitar (all tracks except 3 and 6)
- Mike Rojas – accordion (track 8), B-3 organ (track 7), keyboards (track 3), piano (all tracks except 3)
- Justin Schipper – steel guitar (tracks 3, 6)
- Brett Tyler – acoustic guitar (track 3)

== Chart performance ==
Chart performance for Peso in My Pocket
Chart (2021)	Peak position
US Independent Albums (Billboard)	44
US Top Album Sales (Billboard)	19
US Top Country Albums (Billboard)	25
