= She's a Hottie =

"She's A Hottie"

Single by Toby Keith

from the album 35 Biggest Hits
- Released: March 4, 2008
- Recorded: 2007
- Genre: Country, country rock
- Length: 3:07
- Label: Show Dog
- Songwriters: Toby Keith; Bobby Pinson
- Producer: Toby Keith

Toby Keith singles chronology
"Get My Drink On" (2007)	"She's A Hottie" (2008)	"She Never Cried in Front of Me" (2008)

"She's a Hottie" is a song co-written and recorded by American country music artist Toby Keith. It was the only new track on his 2008 compilation album 35 Biggest Hits, and was released as a single on March 4, 2008. The song was included on the compilation's second disc. Keith wrote the song along with Bobby Pinson.

== Content ==
The song is up-tempo, based on electric guitar and banjo riffs. Its lyrics find the male narrator describing a rebellious but attractive female lover, whom he refers to as a "hottie" ("Hottie, she's a hottie / Got a smokin' little body").

== Music video ==
A live music video from the 2008 CMT Music Awards was released in 2008 and directed by Alan Carter.

== Critical reception ==
Engine 145 critic Brady Vercher gave the song a "thumbs down" rating, calling it "dreadful" and "forgo[ing] any semblance of substance". He also criticized the production, saying that it "sounds like a kid who got a new toy and spent a couple of hours putting something together that he thought sounded cool", noting such points as the vocal distortion on the song's bridge, and the use of repeated "ki yi diggy diggy" in the chorus. Country Weekly critic Chris Neal, in his review of 35 Biggest Hits, also described the song negatively, saying that it was "too slight" to work with or against Keith's "blustery braggadocio". A more positive review was from Kevin John Coyne, reviewing the song for Country Universe. Coyne gave it a B+ rating and he described "She's a Hottie" as "the kind of song that your mind tells you is a piece of trash, right before it betrays you by planting the hook in the deep recesses of your brain and hitting the repeat button." He then goes on to describe it as "some damn fine hillbilly ear candy."

The song is available as downloadable content for the game Rock Band.

== Chart performance ==
The song debuted at number 56 on the Billboard Hot Country Songs chart dated March 15, 2008.

Chart (2008)	Peak position
US Hot Country Songs (Billboard)	13
US Billboard Hot 100	71
US Billboard Pop 100	78
Canada Country (Billboard)	17
Canada Hot 100 (Billboard)	85

== Certifications ==
Region	Certification	Certified units/sales
United States (RIAA)	Gold	500,000^{‡}
^{‡} Sales+streaming figures based on certification alone.
