= Old Toy Trains =

1967 single by Roger Miller

Single by Roger Miller
- B-side: "Silent Night"
- Released: late 1967
- Recorded: early 1967
- Length: 2:02
- Label: Smash
- Songwriter: Roger Miller
- Producer: Jerry Kennedy

Roger Miller singles chronology
"The Ballad of Waterhole #3" (1967)	"Old Toy Trains" (1967)	""Little Green Apples" " (1968)

"Old Toy Trains" (sometimes titled "Little Toy Trains") is a Christmas song written and originally recorded by American musician Roger Miller. It was released in late 1967 as a single for Smash Records. Since the original recording, the song has also been covered by various other artists including Miller's son Dean Miller (for whom the song was written), as well as Toby Keith.

== History ==
Roger Miller wrote "Old Toy Trains" in 1967 for his son, Dean Miller. Released on Smash Records late in the year, the song ended an eight-year ban on Christmas single releases by the label.

== Critical reception ==
An uncredited review in Billboard gave Roger Miller's original version a positive review, saying that "Miller has composed one of his most moving and touching ballads for all ages which he performs to perfection."

== Other versions ==
Glen Campbell recorded the song for his 1968 album That Christmas Feeling.

Nana Mouskouri released her version on her Christmas album entitled Christmas With Nana Mouskouri in 1972.

Raffi recorded the song for his 1983 album Raffi's Christmas Album.

The Statler Brothers recorded the song for their 1985 album Christmas Present.

The Forester Sisters recorded the song for their 1987 album A Christmas Card.

Toby Keith covered the song for the 2000 multi-artist album A Country Christmas 2000. Keith's rendition spent two weeks on the Hot Country Songs charts that year, peaking at number 57.

Two years later, Universal South Records released a version that incorporated Roger Miller's original vocals with those of Dean Miller.

Scott Miller recorded the song for his 2010 EP Christmas Gift.

Violinist André Rieu performed the song with vocalists Mirusia Louwerse, Carla Mafioletti (with Guitar) and Kimmy Skota on his 2012 DVD Home for the Holidays.

Nick Lowe recorded the song for his 2013 Christmas album Quality Street: A Seasonal Selection for All the Family.

Canadian Inuk singer Susan Aglukark recorded a version that appears in her 2013 album Dreaming of Home with additional Inuktitut lyrics.

Randy Travis released a never-before-released version of the song in 2021 for the remastered deluxe edition of his 1989 Christmas album An Old Time Christmas.

Pentatonix covered the song for their 2023 compilation album The Greatest Christmas Hits.

=== Language versions ===
==== Petit Garçon ====
"Petit garçon"

Single by Garou and Ryan
- Released: 2014
- Length: 2:53
- Songwriters: Roger Miller (music); Graeme Allwright (French lyrics)
- Producer: Dominique Blanc Francard

Garou singles chronology
""" ()"	"Petit garçon"

Ryan singles chronology
"Petit garçon" (2014)

The tune has been popular in other languages, notably it was translated to French and recorded in 1968 just one year after the English version by the New Zealand / French singer songwriter Graeme Allwright as "Petit Garçon" (meaning "little boy") in French.

It was covered in French by Greek singer Nana Mouskouri in 1972 as one of the tracks of her album Pour les enfants (meaning For children)

In 2014, the song was adopted as the official tune for the annual French charity event Téléthon 2014. The Canadian French singer Garou that year's main campaign sponsor (parrain) recorded Graeme Allwright's French version "Petit garçon" with Ryan, a young French singer for official release. The song was included in Garou's new album It's Magic released 1 December 2014 in France. During the Téléthon, Garou sang it live accompanied by Hélène Ségara and tennisman and singer Yannick Noah.

== Chart performance ==
Toby Keith version

Chart (2000–2001)	Peak position
U.S. Billboard Hot Country Singles & Tracks	57

Garou & Ryan version as "Petit garçon"

Chart (2014)	Peak position
France (SNEP)	3
