= Graeme Allwright =

New Zealand-born French singer and songwriter (1926–2020)

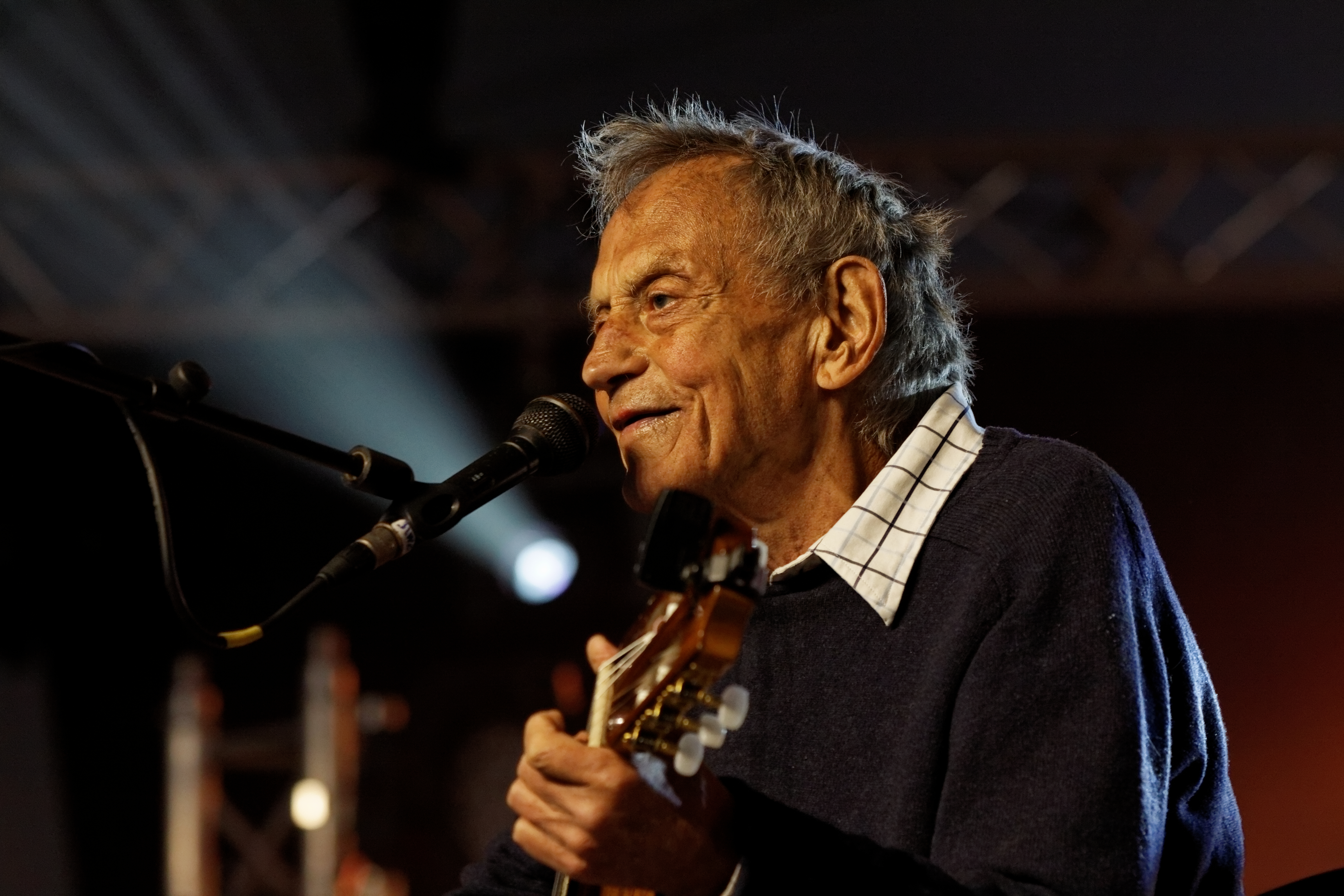
- Graeme Allwright in 2012

Background information
- Born: 7 November 1926; Wellington, New Zealand
- Died: 16 February 2020 (aged 93) Couilly-Pont-aux-Dames, France
- Genres: Contemporary folk music, protest songs, chanson, jazz
- Occupations: Singer, songwriter
- Instrument: Guitar
- Years active: Early 1960s–2020

Graeme Allwright (7 November 1926 – 16 February 2020) was a New Zealand-born French singer and songwriter. He became popular in the 1960s and 1970s as a French language interpreter of the songs of American and Canadian songwriters such as Leonard Cohen, Bob Dylan, and Pete Seeger, and remained active into his nineties.

== Life and career ==
=== Early life ===
Born in Wellington, New Zealand, Allwright grew up in Hāwera before attending Wellington College. While growing up he heard jazz and American folk songs on radio broadcasts for US troops stationed at Paekākāriki and Tītahi Bay, and sang with his family at local fairs. He started acting in Wellington at the age of 15, and won a scholarship to attend the Old Vic theatre school in London. He travelled to England by ship, working as a cabin boy to pay his way, and began training and working as an actor in London. He was offered a place at the Royal Shakespeare Company but turned it down so as to move to France in 1948 with his girlfriend Catherine Dasté, a fellow theatre student who was the daughter of actor and theatre director Jean Dasté. Allwright worked as a carpenter on theatre sets while gradually becoming fluent in the French language. He and Catherine married in 1951; they later divorced.

=== Music career ===
Allwright then worked in the vineyards of Burgundy and ran a theatre group in Pernand-Vergelesses, while learning the guitar and listening to the records of American singers such as Woody Guthrie, Tom Paxton and Pete Seeger. He lived in Blois, where he worked in a psychiatric hospital, and then settled in Dieulefit where he taught English and started a children's theatre group. He discovered an aptitude for translation while adapting New Zealand stories into French for his students, and then, after moving to Saint-Étienne, began translating American songs into French. In the early 1960s he began performing in small clubs in Paris, where he met fellow singer Colette Magny and the actor and singer Marcel Mouloudji, who were impressed with Allwright's ability to adapt the lyrics of writers such as Bob Dylan and Leonard Cohen into French.

Mouloudji recorded Allwright and released his songs in 1965, firstly on the EP "Le Trimardeur" (a song adapted from Woody Guthrie's "Hard Travelin'"), and then on a self-titled LP. The album included adaptations of songs by Guthrie and Oscar Brand as well as several by French songwriter Paul Koulak, and Allwright's own material. He won a recording contract with Mercury Records, and his second album, also entitled Graeme Allwright, was issued in 1968. It featured adaptations of Dylan's "Who Killed Davy Moore?" ("Qui a tué Davy Moore?") and Malvina Reynolds' "Little Boxes" ("Petites boites"), as well as his own song "Il faut que je m'en aille (Les retrouvailles)", and became popular with students during the May 68 protests.

Allwright’s songs were perfectly timed to capture the mood of the young protesters.. He didn’t just sing protest songs – he joined in, and even found himself caught up in the middle of a riot in the Latin Quarter of Paris. Armed CRS police were moving in on his group of protesters from several directions. According to Allwright, it was a dangerous situation, but luckily he managed to escape by running off down a side street. Although his music become closely associated with the protest movement, the significance of the connection wasn’t entirely clear to him at the time. "The young people, the ‘soixante-huitards" of 68, filled up the places where I was singing and were singing my songs. I realise now, afterwards, the impact of certain songs. I didn’t realise at the time how important that was."

Allwright's music "provided anthems for the French left-wing counter-culture." His greatest success came with his third album, Le jour de clarté (1968), which included adaptations of two songs by Leonard Cohen ("Suzanne" and "The Stranger Song"), two by Tom Paxton, and others by Pete Seeger, Jackson C. Frank, and Roger Miller. His most popular song was the title track, adapted from the Peter, Paul and Mary song "Very Last Day". The stress caused by the song's unexpected success led Allwright to leave his young family in France and go travelling, initially with a friend to Egypt and Ethiopia, where he spent six months in the city of Harar. He said: "I didn’t even think of the singing career I left behind. I was living something completely different and discovering another world." In 1970 he released the album A long distant present from thee..."Becoming", a collaboration with other musicians described as "a sprawling psychedelic album that draws on his experiences in India", followed by the English-language album Recollections (1971), and Jeanne d'Arc (1972), comprising his own material as well as songs by Leonard Cohen.

Over the next few years, Allwright developed a tendency to record an album and then leave France for some time to travel in Africa, India, and the Americas, which enhanced his cult status in France. In the mid-1970s he lived for 18 months on Réunion in the Indian Ocean. He became friendly with Cohen, who approved of his adaptations, and in 1973 Allwright released the album Graeme Allwright chante Leonard Cohen. The same year, he released the double live album A l'Olympia. He continued to release albums through the 1970s, culminating in the 1979 album Condamnés?. In 1980 he played a series of concerts with Maxime Le Forestier, recorded on the album Enregistrement Public au Palais des Sports, with the royalties donated to children's charities. In 1985 he released a collection of songs by Georges Brassens.

He continued his campaigning activities, protesting against the French government's nuclear testing in the Pacific, and the sinking of the Rainbow Warrior in 1985.

=== Later years ===
Allwright later worked on film soundtracks, and recorded an album of songs for children. He released the album Tant de Joies, a collaboration with American jazz trombonist Glenn Ferris, in 2000. In 2005, he made a rare return to New Zealand to perform. He performed until the 2010s to spread his non-violent message of working in our conscience to change inegalitarian society. In the 2000s, together with Sylvie Dien, he wrote new lyrics to the French national anthem, "La Marseillaise", to make it a song of peace rather than of war.

Allwright also became well known for his French lyrics adaptation "Petit Garçon" for the Christmas song "Old Toy Trains" by Roger Miller. In 2014, the song was adopted as the official song for the annual French charity event Téléthon 2014 and was recorded by the campaign's sponsor (parrain), the Canadian French singer Garou accompanied by a young singer Ryan. It also appeared in Garou's Christmas new album It's Magic released 1 December 2014 in France.

A biography, Graeme Allwright par lui-même, by Jacques Vassal, was published in 2018.

== Death ==
Allwright died aged 93 on 16 February 2020, in the retirement home in Seine-et-Marne where he had been living for a year.

== Discography ==
=== Albums ===
- Graeme Allwright (aka Le trimardeur), 1965, BAM.
- Graeme Allwright (aka Joue, joue, joue), 1966, Mercury.
- Le jour de clarté, 1968, Mercury.
- Recollections, 1970, Mercury.
- A Long Distant Present from Thee ... "Becoming,", 1971, Mercury 6459 100
- Jeanne d'Arc, 1972, Mercury.
- Graeme Allwright chante Leonard Cohen, 1973, Mercury.
- À l'Olympia, 1973, Mercury.
- De passage, 1975, Mercury.
- Questions..., 1978, Mercury.
- Condamnés?, 1979, Mercury.
- Graeme Allwright et Maxime Le Forestier enregistement au Palais des Sports, 1980, Mercury.
- Ombres, 1981, Mercury.
- Lumière, 1992, EPM.
- Live, 1994, EPM.
- Graeme Allwright & The Glenn Ferris Quartet, 2000, EPM.
