= That Don't Make Me a Bad Guy =

Studio album by Toby Keith
- Released: October 28, 2008
- Genre: Country
- Length: 41:57
- Label: Show Dog Nashville
- Producer: Toby Keith

Toby Keith chronology
| 35 Biggest Hits (2008) | That Don't Make Me a Bad Guy (2008) | American Ride (2009) |

Singles from That Don't Make Me a Bad Guy
- 1. "She Never Cried in Front of Me" Released: July 7, 2008; 2. "God Love Her" Released: November 10, 2008; 3. "Lost You Anyway" Released: March 16, 2009

Professional ratings
Aggregate scores
| Source | Rating |
|---|---|
| Metacritic | (76/100) |
Review scores
| Source | Rating |
| About.com | 4/5 stars |
| Allmusic | 4/5 stars |
| Billboard | (favorable) |
| Entertainment Weekly | B+ |
| The New York Times | (positive) |
| Slant | 3/5 stars |

That Don't Make Me a Bad Guy is the fourteenth studio album by American country music artist Toby Keith. It was released on October 28, 2008, by Show Dog Nashville. The album's lead-off single, "She Never Cried in Front of Me", reached number one on the US Billboard Hot Country Songs chart in late October 2008, as did "God Love Her", the second single, in March 2009. The third single, "Lost You Anyway", was released on March 16, 2009. The album was certified Gold by the RIAA. Keith wrote or co-wrote all the songs on this album, collaborating with Bobby Pinson on all but three.

== Track listing ==
All tracks are written by Toby Keith, with additional co-writers as noted.

| No. | Title | Writer(s) | Length |
|---|---|---|---|
| 1. | "That Don't Make Me a Bad Guy" | Bobby Pinson; Vicky McGehee | 3:41 |
| 2. | "Creole Woman" | Pinson | 4:32 |
| 3. | "God Love Her" | McGehee | 3:36 |
| 4. | "Lost You Anyway" | Pinson | 3:38 |
| 5. | "Missing Me Some You" | | 4:44 |
| 6. | "Hurt a Lot Worse When You Go" | Pinson | 4:21 |
| 7. | "Time That It Would Take" | Pinson | 3:21 |
| 8. | "You Already Love Me" | Pinson | 3:32 |
| 9. | "She Never Cried in Front of Me" | Pinson | 3:59 |
| 10. | "Cabo San Lucas" | Eddy Raven | 3:08 |
| 11. | "I Got It for You Girl" | Pinson | 3:11 |
| Total length: | | | 41:47 |

== Personnel ==
- Perry Coleman – background vocals
- Eric Darken – percussion
- Shannon Forrest – drums
- Paul Franklin – steel guitar, dobro
- Kenny Greenberg – electric guitar
- Rob Hajacos – fiddle
- Vicki Hampton – background vocals
- Mark Hill – bass guitar
- Jim Hoke – tenor saxophone
- Charles Judge – keyboards, piano
- Toby Keith – lead vocals, background vocals, acoustic guitar
- Jerry McPherson – electric guitar
- Brent Mason – electric guitar
- Steve Nathan – keyboards, piano
- Steve Patrick – trumpet
- Scat Springs – background vocals
- Ilya Toshinsky – acoustic guitar, banjo, mandolin
- Glenn Worf – bass guitar

== Chart performance ==
=== Weekly charts ===
| Chart (2008) | Peak position |
|---|---|
| Norwegian Albums (VG-lista) | 2 |
| US Billboard 200 | 5 |
| US Top Country Albums (Billboard) | 1 |

=== Year-end charts ===
| Chart (2008) | Position |
|---|---|
| US Top Country Albums (Billboard) | 52 |
| Chart (2009) | Position |
| US Billboard 200 | 132 |
| US Top Country Albums (Billboard) | 25 |

== Certifications ==
| Region | Certification | Certified units/sales |
|---|---|---|
| United States (RIAA) | Gold | 500,000^{^} |
^{^} Shipments figures based on certification alone.
