= Blue Moon (Toby Keith album) =

Studio album by Toby Keith
- Released: April 16, 1996
- Recorded: 1995–96
- Studios: Alpine, Scruggs (Nashville, TN)
- Genre: Country
- Length: 39:44
- Labels: Mercury; A&M
- Producers: Nelson Larkin; Toby Keith

Toby Keith chronology
Christmas to Christmas (1995)	Blue Moon (1996)	Dream Walkin' (1997)

Singles from Blue Moon
- 1. "Does That Blue Moon Ever Shine on You" Released: February 27, 1996; 2. "A Woman's Touch" Released: July 1, 1996; 3. "Me Too" Released: November 18, 1996

Professional ratings
Review scores
Source	Rating
Allmusic	3/5 stars
Entertainment Weekly	B−

Blue Moon is the fourth studio album by American country music artist Toby Keith. Released on April 16, 1996, it was his only studio album for A&M Records. The album was certified platinum by the RIAA for sales of one million copies in the United States. Overall, it produced three singles for Keith on the Billboard Hot Country Songs charts: "Does That Blue Moon Ever Shine on You?" (#2), "A Woman's Touch" (#6), and "Me Too" (#1).

The lead single was issued via Polydor Records, which closed soon afterward. The closure resulted in Keith moving to A&M for the album's release proper. Mercury Records took over for the third single. Keith later said that he was only with A&M briefly for fifteen weeks.

== Track listing ==
No.	Title	Writer(s)	Length
1.	"The Lonely"	Chuck Cannon, Mark Jones, Lari White	4:16
2.	"Every Night"	Toby Keith, Ron Reynolds	3:49
3.	"Closin' Time at Home"	Keith, Michael Crossno	3:14
4.	"A Woman's Touch"	Keith, Wayne Perry	5:35
5.	"Does That Blue Moon Ever Shine on You"	Keith	3:50
6.	"Lucky Me"	Keith, Reynolds	4:19
7.	"She's Perfect"	Keith, Perry	3:43
8.	"She's Gonna Get It"	Keith, Perry	3:26
9.	"Me Too"	Keith, Cannon	3:53
10.	"Hello"	Keith, Jim Femino	3:39

== Personnel ==
- Michael Black – background vocals
- Michael Crossno – electric guitar
- Tom Flora – background vocals
- Sonny Garrish – steel guitar
- Carl "Chuck" Goff Jr. – bass guitar
- Tim Gonzales – harmonica
- Owen Hale – drums
- Johnny Helms – steel guitar
- Clayton Ivey – keyboards
- Toby Keith – lead vocals
- Chris Leuzinger – electric guitar
- Gary Lunn – bass guitar
- Brent Mason – electric guitar
- Keith Mellington – drums
- Don Potter – acoustic guitar
- Ron "Snake" Reynolds – electric guitar, percussion
- Russell Terrell – background vocals
- Chris Troup – keyboards
- Dennis Wilson – background vocals
- Reggie Young – electric guitar

Additional background vocals on "The Lonely" provided by Chuck Cannon and Lari White.

== Charts ==
=== Weekly charts ===
Chart (1996)	Peak position
US Billboard 200	51
US Top Country Albums (Billboard)	6

=== Year-end charts ===
Chart (1996)	Position
US Top Country Albums (Billboard)	45
Chart (1997)	Position
US Top Country Albums (Billboard)	73

== Certifications ==
Region	Certification	Certified units/sales
United States (RIAA)	Platinum	1,000,000^{^}
^{^} Shipments figures based on certification alone.
