= Christmas to Christmas =

Studio album by Toby Keith
- Released: October 17, 1995
- Studio: Scruggs Sound (Berry Hill, Tennessee)
- Genre: Country, Christmas
- Length: 42:06
- Label: Mercury
- Producer: Nelson Larkin; Harold Shedd

Toby Keith chronology
Boomtown (1994)	Christmas to Christmas (1995)	Blue Moon (1996)

Christmas to Christmas is the third studio album and first Christmas album released on October 17, 1995, by American country music artist Toby Keith. His first studio album of Christmas music, it produced one single which charted from Christmas airplay in late 1995-early 1996: the track "Santa I'm Right Here", which peaked at #50 on the Hot Country Songs charts. A reissue was released in 2024 with a cover of Roger Miller’s "Old Toy Trains".

== Critical reception ==
Roch Parisien of AllMusic reviewed the album favorably, stating that "The playing is casual, back-porch rootsy. It is first and foremost a collection of good songs, well performed, that just happen to be about Christmas."

== Track listing ==
1. "Santa, I'm Right Here" (Ron Reynolds) - 4:39
2. "Bethlehem in Birmingham" (Weston Harvey, Scott Lynch) - 3:18
3. "Christmas Rock" (Lewis Anderson) - 2:33
4. "Blame It on the Mistletoe" (Toby Keith) - 3:06
5. "Santa's Gonna Take It All Back" (Keith, Reynolds) - 3:18
6. "The Night Before Christmas" (Sam Hogin, Nelson Larkin, Jim McBride) - 3:42
7. "Hot Rod Sleigh" (Keith) - 3:38
8. "Christmas to Christmas" (Ron Hallard, Alan Rhody) - 3:23
9. "Jesus Gets Jealous of Santa Claus" (Vernon Rust, Keith Urban) - 3:35
10. "Mary, It's Christmas" (Keith, Reynolds) - 3:19
11. "All I Want for Christmas" (Ronnie Rogers) - 3:35
12. "What Made the Baby Cry?" (William Golay) - 4:00
13. "Old Toy Trains" (Miller) - 2:04 (2024 reissue)

== Personnel ==
- Michael Black - background vocals
- Duncan Cameron - electric guitar
- Tom Flora - background vocals
- Sonny Garrish - steel guitar
- Felipe Chele Gonzalez - harmonica
- Owen Hale - drums
- Clayton Ivey - keyboards
- Toby Keith - lead vocals
- B. James Lowry - acoustic guitar
- Gary Lunn - bass guitar
- Ron "Snake" Reynolds - electric guitar, percussion
- Russell Terrell - background vocals
- Dennis Wilson - background vocals
- Reggie Young - electric guitar
