= Greatest Hits 2 (Toby Keith album) =

Greatest hits album by Toby Keith
- Released: November 9, 2004
- Genre: Country
- Length: 50:41
- Label: DreamWorks
- Producer: James Stroud, Toby Keith ("Mockingbird" produced by Toby Keith, James Stroud and Lari White)

Toby Keith chronology
Shock'n Y'all (2003)	Greatest Hits 2 (2004)	Honkytonk University (2005)

Singles from Greatest Hits 2
- 1. "Stays in Mexico" Released: August 16, 2004; 2. "Mockingbird" Released: November 8, 2004

Greatest Hits 2 is the second compilation album by American country music artist Toby Keith. It was released on November 9, 2004 by DreamWorks Records, a label Keith worked with the record company from 1999 to 2006.

The compilation contains singles from Keith's first three DreamWorks albums, as well as five new recordings. Three of these new recordings are studio tracks, of which two ("Stays in Mexico" and "Mockingbird") were released as singles, reaching No. 3 and No. 27, respectively, on the Hot Country Songs charts. "Mockingbird", a cover of the Inez and Charlie Foxx hit, features Keith's daughter Krystal as a duet partner. Although this compilation was released a year after Keith's eighth studio album Shock'n Y'all, it does not feature any singles from that album.

The last two tracks on the album are newly recorded live renditions of two of Keith's early hits: his 1993 No. 1 debut single "Should've Been a Cowboy" (originally from his self-titled debut album), and his 1995 No. 2 hit "You Ain't Much Fun" (originally from Boomtown).

== Commercial performance ==
The album was first certified Gold by the RIAA on December 9, 2004, and reached triple platinum on January 11, 2006. It has sold 4,067,900 copies in the United States as of October 2019.

Professional ratings
Review scores
Source	Rating
Allmusic	link

== Track listing ==
No.	Title	Writer(s)	Length
1.	"How Do You Like Me Now?!"	Toby Keith, Chuck Cannon	3:26
2.	"Country Comes to Town"	Keith	3:38
3.	"You Shouldn't Kiss Me Like This"	Keith	3:40
4.	"I'm Just Talkin' About Tonight"	Keith, Scotty Emerick	2:46
5.	"I Wanna Talk About Me"	Bobby Braddock	3:04
6.	"My List"	Rand Bishop, Tim James	3:21
7.	"Courtesy of the Red, White and Blue (The Angry American)"	Keith	3:16
8.	"Who's Your Daddy?"	Keith	3:59
9.	"Beer for My Horses" (duet with Willie Nelson)	Keith, Emerick	3:32
10.	"Stays in Mexico"	Keith	3:35
11.	"Mockingbird" (duet with Krystal Keith)	Inez Foxx, Charlie Foxx	3:32
12.	"Go with Her"	Keith, Emerick, Dean Dillon	3:34
13.	"You Ain't Much Fun" (Live)	Keith, Carl Goff Jr.	4:16
14.	"Should've Been a Cowboy" (Live)	Keith	5:01

== Personnel on New Tracks ==
- Lisa Cochran - background vocals
- Mark Douthit - saxophone
- Roman Dudok - saxophone
- Scotty Emerick - acoustic guitar
- Shannon Forrest - drums
- Paul Franklin - steel guitar
- Kenny Greenberg - electric guitar
- Wes Hightower - background vocals
- Clayton Ivey - Hammond B-3 organ, keyboards, piano
- Gaika James - trombone
- Krystal Keith - duet vocals on "Mockingbird"
- Toby Keith - lead vocals
- Julian King - trumpet, background vocals
- Brent Mason - electric guitar
- Jerry McPherson - electric guitar
- Steve Nathan - Hammond B-3 organ, keyboards, piano
- Michael Rhodes - bass guitar
- Willie Roy Jr. - trumpet
- John Wesley Ryles - background vocals
- Biff Watson - acoustic guitar
- Glenn Worf - bass guitar

== Charts ==
=== Weekly charts ===
Chart (2004)	Peak position
Canadian Albums (Billboard)	8
US Billboard 200	3
US Top Country Albums (Billboard)	2

=== Year-end charts ===
Chart (2004)	Position
US Top Country Albums (Billboard)	30
Worldwide Albums (IFPI)	33
Chart (2005)	Position
US Billboard 200	12
US Top Country Albums (Billboard)	3
Chart (2006)	Position
US Billboard 200	110
US Top Country Albums (Billboard)	25
Chart (2019)	Position
US Top Country Albums (Billboard)	86

== Certifications ==
Region	Certification	Certified units/sales
Canada (Music Canada)	Platinum	100,000^{^}
United States (RIAA)	3× Platinum	4,067,900
^{^} Shipments figures based on certification alone.
