= She Never Cried in Front of Me =

Single by Toby Keith

from the album That Don't Make Me a Bad Guy
- Released: July 7, 2008
- Genre: Country
- Length: 3:36
- Label: Show Dog Nashville
- Songwriters: Toby Keith; Bobby Pinson
- Producer: Toby Keith

Toby Keith singles chronology
"She's a Hottie" (2008)	"She Never Cried in Front of Me" (2008)	"God Love Her" (2008)

"She Never Cried in Front of Me" is a song co-written and recorded by American country music singer Toby Keith. It was released in July 2008 as the first single for his 2008 album That Don't Make Me a Bad Guy. For the week of November 1, 2008, the song has become Keith's 17th number one hit on the US Billboard Hot Country Songs chart. Keith wrote this song with Bobby Pinson.

== Content ==
The song is a power ballad in which the narrator realizes that his former lover has just gotten married. He's heard that she cried during the ceremony, which makes him think of all the "hell" he put her through when they were together, thinking that nothing was wrong with her, because she "never cried in front of [him]".

Bobby Pinson wrote the song with Keith at Keith's house in mid-2007. According to Pinson, he sat down at Keith's piano and the two started working on the song there. According to Keith, it was the first time that he ever sat down at a piano to write a song, and he thought that it "changed everything. It brought a whole new approach to the melody."

== Critical reception ==
The song received a "thumbs down" review from the country music site Engine 145. Reviewer Brady Vercher stated that the "lyric fleshes out too many irrelevant details that end up creating all sorts of logical fallacies", and that the song was generally over-produced. He also considered it derivative of fellow artist Tracy Lawrence's 1994 hit "I See It Now", which also features a storyline based on a man's realization of "all the hell" he has put a former lover through. Kevin John Coyne of Country Universe gave the song an A-minus, saying that Keith "sings the hell out of" the song, but criticizing the "arena rock" production of the chorus.

== Chart performance ==
Chart (2008)	Peak position
US Hot Country Songs (Billboard)	1
US Billboard Hot 100	42
Canada Country (Billboard)	4
Canada Hot 100 (Billboard)	57

=== Year-end charts ===
Chart (2008)	Position
US Country Songs (Billboard)	11

== Certifications ==
Region	Certification	Certified units/sales
United States (RIAA)	Gold	500,000^{^}
^{^} Shipments figures based on certification alone.
