= Mica Roberts =

American singer-songwriter

- Origin: Locust Grove, Oklahoma, United States
- Genres: Country
- Occupation: Singer-Songwriter
- Instrument: Vocals
- Years active: 2008–present
- Label: Show Dog Nashville
- Website: Official site

Mica Roberts (born in Locust Grove, Oklahoma) is an American country music artist signed to Show Dog Nashville, a label owned by country singer Toby Keith.

In 2008, she released her debut single, "Things a Mama Don't Know", a duet with Toby Keith. The song was the lead-off single to her debut EP, Days You Live For. The song only managed to peak at No. 55 on the U.S. Billboard Hot Country Songs chart in 2008. It would be nearly a year before the release of her second single and album. In September 2009, the EP was released on September 15, via Show Dog Nashville. The second single "Days You Live For" was released in October 2009, where it debuted at No. 60 for the week of October 17, 2009.

== Music career ==
Roberts has performed background vocals for Faith Hill, and has toured with Jessica Andrews and Martina McBride. She also sang backing vocals on two tracks from Andrews' 2003 album Now. Eventually, she caught the attention of Willie Nelson, who recommended her to Toby Keith; she joined his backing band, Easy Money, as a guest musician. By 2008, Roberts was signed to Keith's Show Dog label, and released her debut single "Things a Mama Don't Know" that year. The song only managed to peak at No. 55 on the U.S. Billboard Hot Country Songs chart.

She and Keith also sang the song "Let's Get Trashed" on the soundtrack to the 2008 film Beer for My Horses, in which Keith starred.

On September 15, 2009, she released an EP entitled Day You Live For. The EP included "Things a Mama Don't Know", as well as her second single, the title track. The latter song would debut at No. 60 on the country charts for the week of October 17, 2009 before falling off. It later re-entered the chart at No. 57 for the week of November 14, 2009.

Roberts worked with Journey band member Jonathan Cain in 2006 by performing a duet with him on the track "Faithfully", which is a cover version of the song made famous by Journey in the 1980s. The track appears on Cain's solo album, "Where I Live".

== Discography ==
=== Extended plays ===
Title	Album details
Uncover Me	Release date: 2004; Label: Private Release
Days You Live For	Release date: September 15, 2009; Label: Show Dog Nashville

=== Singles ===
Year	Single	Peak positions	Album
Year	Single	US Country	Album
2008	"Things a Mama Don't Know" (with Toby Keith)	55	Days You Live For
2009	"Days You Live For"	57	Days You Live For

=== Music videos ===
Year	Video	Director
2008	"Things a Mama Don't Know"	Michael Salomon

=== Album appearances ===
Year	Song	Album
2006	"Faithfully" (with Jonathan Cain)	Where I Live
2008	"Let's Get Trashed" (with Toby Keith)	Beer for My Horses (soundtrack)
