= Krystal Keith =

American country music singer (born 1985)

- Also known as: Krystal Covel; Krystal Sandubrae
- Born: Krystal Ladawn Covel; September 30, 1985 (age 40); Norman, Oklahoma, U.S.
- Genres: Country
- Occupation: Singer-songwriter
- Instrument: Vocals
- Years active: 2004, 2013–present
- Label: Show Dog-Universal Music
- Spouse: Andrew Robert Sandubrae (m. 2007)

Krystal Ladawn Covel Sandubrae (born September 30, 1985), known professionally as Krystal Keith, is an American country music singer. She is the daughter of country singer Toby Keith. In 2004, she made her singing debut accompanying her father on a cover of Inez and Charlie Foxx's "Mockingbird". She returned to music in 2013 on the Show Dog-Universal Music label, then co-owned by her father, and released one album and two extended plays.

== Early life ==
Krystal Ladawn Covel was born on September 30, 1985, to fellow country singer Toby Keith and Tricia Covel (née Lucus). She has one younger brother, Stelen Keith Covel, and one maternal half-sister, Shelley Covel Rowland, who was adopted by Toby upon his marriage to their mother.

== Career ==
Keith's first chart entry was in 2004, when she sang duet vocals with her father on a cover of Inez and Charlie Foxx's "Mockingbird" which appeared on his 2004 album Greatest Hits 2. The two also performed the song together at the 2004 Country Music Association awards. After this song was released, Keith attended college at her father's insistence. She graduated from the University of Oklahoma.

In mid-2013, Keith signed to Show Dog-Universal Music. She released a four-song extended play, which includes her debut single "Daddy Dance with Me". She wrote the song as a surprise to her father and performed it for the first time on the day of her wedding. The song is included on her debut album Whiskey & Lace, produced by her father and Mark Wright. The EP received a positive review from Daryl Addison of Great American Country, who called her a "confident young singer with a strong voice". The second single from Whiskey & Lace, "Get Your Redneck On", was released to country radio on September 30, 2013.

== Personal life ==
Keith began dating “Sandubrae Energy, LLC” founder and president, Andrew Robert Sandubrae in 2004. They married in 2007 after 3 years of dating. Together they have two daughters.

On May 11, 2024, Keith accepted an honorary degree from the University of Oklahoma on behalf of her father, who died of stomach cancer three months prior.

== Discography ==
=== Albums ===
Title	Album details	Peak positions
Title	Album details	US Heat
Whiskey & Lace	Release date: December 10, 2013; Label: Show Dog-Universal Music	12

=== Extended plays ===
Title	Album details	Peak chart positions	
Title	Album details	US Country	US Heat
Krystal Keith	Release date: April 16, 2013; Label: Show Dog-Universal Music	53	25
Boulder	Release date: July 13, 2018; Label: Show Dog-Universal Music	—	—

=== Singles ===
Year	Single	Peak chart positions	Album
Year	Single	US Country Airplay	Album
2013	"Daddy Dance with Me"	58	Whiskey & Lace
2013	"Get Your Redneck On"	—	Whiskey & Lace
2018	"Anyone Else" (with Lance Carpenter)	—	Boulder
"—" denotes releases that did not chart

=== Guest singles ===
Year	Single	Artist	Peak chart positions	Album
Year	Single	Artist	US Country	Album
2004	"Mockingbird"	Toby Keith	27	Greatest Hits 2

=== Music videos ===
Year	Video	Director
2013	"Daddy Dance with Me"	Michael Salomon
2018	"Anyone Else"	
