= Beer for My Horses =

2003 single by Willie Nelson and Toby Keith

Single by Toby Keith and Willie Nelson

from the album Unleashed
- B-side: "Rock You Baby"
- Released: April 7, 2003
- Recorded: 2002
- Genre: Country; rock
- Length: 3:24 (album version); 3:31 (Greatest Hits 2 version)
- Label: DreamWorks 450785
- Songwriters: Scotty Emerick; Toby Keith
- Producers: James Stroud; Toby Keith

Toby Keith singles chronology
"Rock You Baby" (2003)	"Beer for My Horses" (2003)	"I Love This Bar" (2003)

Willie Nelson singles chronology
"Mendocino County Line" (2002)	"Beer for My Horses" (2003)	"Please Come Home for Christmas" (2004)

"Beer for My Horses" is a song recorded by American country music artists Toby Keith and Willie Nelson. It was written by Keith and Scotty Emerick for Keith's seventh studio album, Unleashed. The song was released as the album's fourth and final single on April 7, 2003.

"Beer for My Horses" was extremely popular but received mixed reviews from music critics. The single reached #22 on the Billboard Hot 100, making it Keith's highest charting song of his career at the time. The song also peaked at number one for six weeks in the US Billboard Hot Country Songs (one of two songs to stay that long at the top for Keith), becoming Keith's eleventh number one single and Nelson's twenty-third, and his first since "Nothing I Can Do About It Now" in 1989. "Beer for My Horses" was certified Platinum once by the Recording Industry Association of America (RIAA).

The accompanying music video was directed by Michael Salomon and premiered on CMT on April 9, 2003, during CMT Smash Hits of Country.

"Beer for My Horses" also made Willie Nelson the oldest artist to top the country charts at age 70.

The phrase, "Whisky for me beer for my horse" is said in the 1975 film, Bite the Bullet, by Jan-Michael Vincent.

== Music video ==
The music video for the song features Keith, Nelson, and Corin Nemec, as detectives hunting a serial killer, played by Gregg Gilmore. The detectives eventually convince Nemec to dress up as a woman to lure the serial killer and they end up capturing him. The video, directed by Michael Salomon, was shot in downtown Los Angeles and at the nearby Golden Oak Ranch, in Newhall, California. It is also the first video in which Keith is not singing on screen. On March 4, 2004, the video was nominated for Video of the Year for the Academy of Country Music Awards.

== In popular culture ==
The 2008 film Beer for My Horses was based on the song, which was featured in the film. The film starred Keith and Nelson, among others. The song was also used in an episode of Lethal Weapon in 2016. It won the award for Video of the Year in May later that year.

In 2021, U.S. Representative Chip Roy of Texas caused controversy by unknowingly quoting a lyric from the song that seemed to invoke frontier justice while he was serving on a committee concerned about an increase in hate crimes towards Asian-Americans. At the time Roy claimed the line was "an old saying in Texas" but later admitted it was from the Keith song.

== Critical reception ==
Stephen Thomas Erlewine of AllMusic found the song to be "absurdly anthemic".

== Chart and sales performance ==
"Beer for My Horses" entered the Hot Country Singles & Tracks charts dated for the week ending August 3, 2002, spending three weeks on the charts as an album cut and peaking at number 54. It re-entered at #60 on the chart dated February 1, 2003. On the Billboard Hot 100, it ended up peaking at number 22. Along with "Who's Your Daddy?", it was tied for Keith's highest peaking single on the chart until it was surpassed by "Red Solo Cup" in 2012. The song reached over a million in sales in April 2014. As of January 2017, the song has sold 1,178,000 copies in the United States.

== Charts ==
Chart (2003)	Peak position
US Hot Country Songs (Billboard)	1
US Billboard Hot 100	22

=== Year-end charts ===
Chart (2003)	Position
US Country Songs (Billboard)	2

== Certifications ==
Region	Certification	Certified units/sales
United States (RIAA)	3× Platinum	3,000,000^{‡}
^{‡} Sales+streaming figures based on certification alone.

== Other ==
A film adaptation of the song entered production in mid-2008, and was released on August 8, 2008.

The song is available as downloadable content for the game Rock Band.
