= Me Too (Toby Keith song) =

Single by Toby Keith

from the album Blue Moon
- B-side: "The Lonely"
- Released: November 18, 1996
- Genre: Country
- Length: 3:53
- Label: A&M Nashville 578810
- Songwriters: Toby Keith; Chuck Cannon
- Producers: Nelson Larkin; Toby Keith

Toby Keith singles chronology
"A Woman's Touch" (1996)	"Me Too" (1996)	"We Were in Love" (1997)

"Me Too" is a song co-written and recorded by American country music singer Toby Keith. It was released on November 18, 1996 as the third and final single from his album Blue Moon. The song reached the top of the Billboard Hot Country Singles & Tracks chart. Keith wrote the song with Chuck Cannon.

== Content ==
The song is a romantic ballad from the perspective of a man who regularly struggles with saying the phrase "I love you" to his significant other, and instead performs physical tasks as a way of showing his affection to her. The only easy way for him to utter that phrase is by simply telling her "me too" after she says "I love you" to him first, hoping she will understand that means he is in agreement with what she just told him.

== Critical reception ==
Deborah Evans Price, of Billboard magazine reviewed the song favorably, saying that it is a song that a lot of men will relate to. She goes on to say that Keith "turns in a smooth believable performance."

== Music video ==
This was the last Toby Keith video that Marc Ball directed, who has been directed Toby Keith videos since 1993. It premiered on CMT on January 12, 1997, when CMT named it a "Hot Shot".

== Chart positions ==
"Me Too" debuted at number 72 on the U.S. Billboard Hot Country Singles & Tracks for the week of November 23, 1996.

Chart (1996–1997)	Peak position
Canada Country Singles (RPM)	6
US Hot Country Songs (Billboard)	1

=== Year-end charts ===
Chart (1997)	Position
Canada Country Tracks (RPM)	70
US Country Songs (Billboard)	43
