= A Woman's Touch (song) =

Single by Toby Keith

from the album Blue Moon
- B-side: "She's Perfect"
- Released: July 1, 1996
- Recorded: 1996
- Genre: Country
- Length: 5:35 (album version); 3:33 (single version)
- Label: A&M 581714
- Songwriters: Toby Keith; Wayne Perry
- Producers: Nelson Larkin; Toby Keith

Toby Keith singles chronology
"Does That Blue Moon Ever Shine on You" (1996)	"A Woman's Touch" (1996)	"Me Too" (1996)

"A Woman's Touch" is a song co-written and recorded by American country music artist Toby Keith. It was released in July 1996 as the second single from his 1996 album Blue Moon. It peaked at number 6 in the United States, and number 11 in Canada. Keith wrote this song with Wayne Perry.

== Critical reception ==
Larry Flick, of Billboard magazine reviewed the song favorably saying that "Keith's warm baritone wraps around the lyric and brings the song to life with the authority of a man who has been there."

== Chart positions ==
"A Woman's Touch" debuted at number 73 on the Hot Country Singles & Tracks chart for the week of July 13, 1996.

Chart (1996)	Peak position
Canada Country Singles (RPM)	10
US Hot Country Songs (Billboard)	6

=== Year-end charts ===
Chart (1996)	Position
US Country Songs (Billboard)	75
