= Does That Blue Moon Ever Shine on You =

Single by Toby Keith

from the album Blue Moon
- B-side: "She's Gonna Get It"
- Released: February 27, 1996
- Recorded: 1996
- Genre: Country
- Length: 3:50
- Label: Polydor
- Songwriter: Toby Keith
- Producers: Nelson Larkin; Toby Keith

Toby Keith singles chronology
"Big Ol' Truck" (1995)	"Does That Blue Moon Ever Shine on You" (1996)	"A Woman's Touch" (1996)

"Does That Blue Moon Ever Shine on You", or simply "Blue Moon", is a song written and recorded by American country music artist Toby Keith. It was released on February 27, 1996, as the lead single from his 1996 album Blue Moon. The song peaked at number 2 on the US Billboard Hot Country Songs chart and reached number 9 in Canada. Keith wrote the song in 1987, and first released it that year on an independent label. It is the first lead single by Keith that does not feature as the opening track on the album.

== Critical reception ==
Deborah Evans Price, of Billboard magazine reviewed the song favorably, calling it "a perfect example of a Keith-penned weeper that is also a sensuous and languid ballad." She goes on to say that the ballad is a "perfect showcase for Keith's vocals, which have never sounded better." The song works well according to Price because of the "poignancy of the lyric and the way the production shows the strength of his voice."

== Music video ==
The song's music video was directed by Marc Ball, and premiered on CMT on March 1, 1996, when CMT named it a "Hot Shot".

== Chart performance ==
"Does That Blue Moon Ever Shine on You" debuted at number 65 on the Hot Country Singles & Tracks chart for the week of March 9, 1996.

Chart (1996)	Peak position
Canada Country Singles (RPM)	9
US Bubbling Under Hot 100 (Billboard)	12
US Hot Country Songs (Billboard)	2

=== Year-end charts ===
Chart (1996)	Position
Canada Country Tracks (RPM)	97
US Country Songs (Billboard)	16
