= Toby Keith =

American singer (1961–2024)

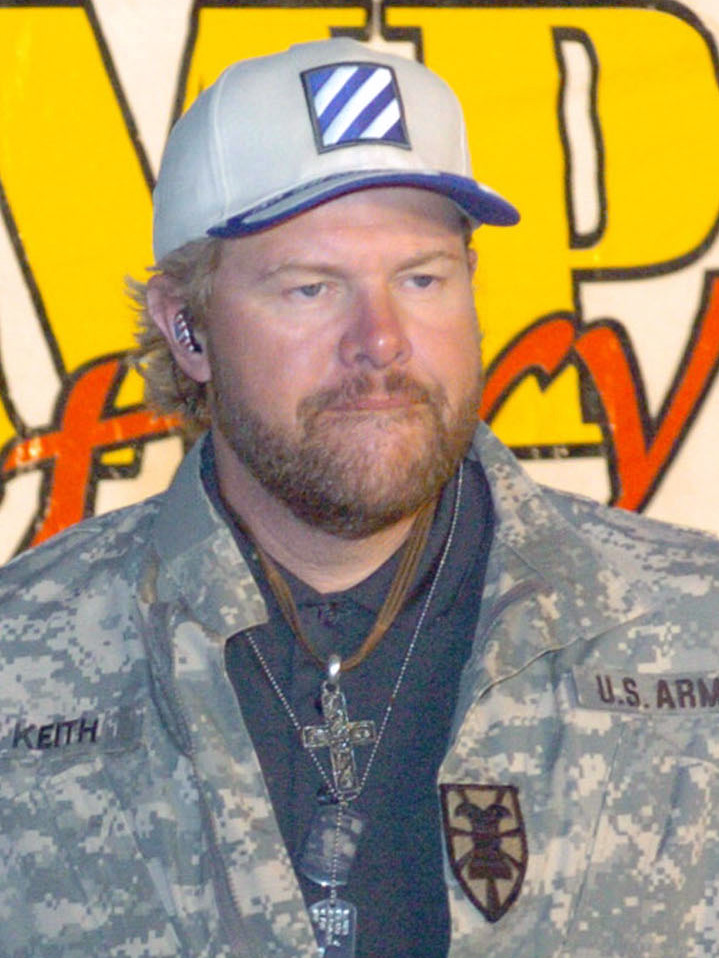
- Keith in 2007
- Born: Toby Keith Covel; July 8, 1961; Clinton, Oklahoma, U.S.
- Died: February 5, 2024 (aged 62); Oklahoma, U.S.
- Occupations: Singer; songwriter; actor; record producer; businessman
- Years active: 1993–2024
- Political party: Independent (from 2008)
- Other political affiliations: Democratic (until 2008)
- Spouse: Tricia Lucus (m. 1984)
- Children: 3, including Krystal
- Musical career
- Genre: Country
- Instruments: Vocals; guitar
- Labels: Mercury Nashville; Polydor; A&M; DreamWorks Nashville; Show Dog-Universal Music (formerly Show Dog Nashville)
- Website: tobykeith.com

Toby Keith Covel (July 8, 1961 – February 5, 2024) was an American country music singer, songwriter, record producer, actor, and businessman. He began using the stage name Toby Keith early in his music career.

Keith's debut single, "Should've Been a Cowboy", topped the Billboard Hot Country Songs chart in 1993. "How Do You Like Me Now?!" was the number one country song of 2000. In all, Keith has had 42 top 10 country hits and 33 No. 1s. He has released 19 studio albums, two Christmas albums, and five compilation albums, totaling worldwide sales of over 44 million albums. He was nominated for seven Grammy Awards, and was awarded the National Medal of Arts by President Donald Trump in a closed ceremony alongside Ricky Skaggs on January 13, 2021.

In 2005, Keith founded the label Show Dog Nashville, which later became Show Dog-Universal Music. Keith also made his acting debut in 2006, starring in the film Broken Bridges. He co-starred with comedian Rodney Carrington in the 2008 film Beer for My Horses, inspired by his namesake 2003 duet with Willie Nelson.

Keith died on February 5, 2024, from stomach cancer. He was inducted into the Country Music Hall of Fame in 2024, having been elected just hours after his death.

== Early life and education ==
Toby Keith Covel was born on July 8, 1961, in Clinton, Oklahoma, to Carolyn Joan (née Ross) and Hubert K. Covel Jr. He had a sister and a brother. The family lived in Fort Smith, Arkansas, for a few years when Keith was in grade school but moved to Moore, Oklahoma (a suburb of Oklahoma City), when he was still young. Before the family moved to Moore, he visited his grandmother in Fort Smith during the summers. His grandmother owned Billie Garner's Supper Club in Fort Smith, where Keith became interested in the musicians who came there to play. He did odd jobs around the supper club and started getting up on the bandstand to play with the band. He got his first guitar at the age of eight.

After the family moved to Moore, Keith attended Southgate Elementary, Highland West Junior High and Moore High School, where he played defensive end on the football team.

Keith graduated from Moore High School and worked as a derrick hand in the oil fields. He worked his way up to become a supervisor. When Keith was 20, he and his friends formed the Easy Money Band, which played at local bars and roadhouses as he continued to work in the oil industry. At times, he would have to leave in the middle of a concert if he was paged to work in the oil field.

In 1982, the oil industry in Oklahoma began a rapid decline, and Keith soon found himself unemployed. He fell back on his football training and joined the Oklahoma City Drillers of the semi-pro American Football Association, and played defensive end while continuing to perform with his band. When the Drillers folded after only two games, he returned to focus once again on music. The Easy Money Band then began playing the honky-tonk circuit in Oklahoma and Texas.

== Musical career ==
Keith went to Nashville, Tennessee, where he busked (street performing) along Music Row to no avail, until producer Harold Shedd signed him with Mercury Records after receiving a copy of Keith's demo tape from a flight attendant who was a fan of Keith's.

=== 1993–1995: Toby Keith and Boomtown ===
Keith's debut single, "Should've Been a Cowboy", went to number one on the U.S. Billboard Hot Country Songs chart in 1993, and it reached number 93 on the Billboard Hot 100. His self-titled debut album was certified platinum by the Recording Industry Association of America (RIAA) for shipments of one million copies, and produced three more Top 5 hits on the country charts with "He Ain't Worth Missing" (at No. 5), "A Little Less Talk and a Lot More Action" (originally the B-side of "Should've Been a Cowboy"), and "Wish I Didn't Know Now" (both at No. 2). Stephen Thomas Erlewine of AllMusic wrote of the album, "It is given a production that's a bit too big, clean, glossy and cavernous for Keith's good—it fits the outsized sound of early-'90s radio, but not his outsized talent—but beneath that sheen the songs are very strong." He also thought that it showed the signs of the style that Keith would develop on subsequent albums. The album's success led to Keith touring with then-labelmates Shania Twain and John Brannen. Keith and Twain also appeared in Tracy Lawrence's music video for "My Second Home" in 1993.

Keith then signed with Polydor Records Nashville, with whom he released his second album, Boomtown, in September 1994. Also certified platinum, this album was led off by the number one single "Who's That Man". Follow up singles "Upstairs Downtown" and "You Ain't Much Fun" both made the Top 10, while "Big Ol' Truck" peaked at number 15. In time for the 1995 holiday season, he released his first Christmas album, Christmas to Christmas, via Mercury. Composed entirely of original songs, the album produced one chart entry in "Santa I'm Right Here", which reached as high as number 50 based on Christmas airplay.

=== 1996–1998: Blue Moon, Dream Walkin', and Greatest Hits Volume One ===
Keith then signed with the short-lived Nashville division of A&M Records to release his third album Blue Moon in April 1996. That album received a platinum certification and produced three singles. Its first single, "Does That Blue Moon Ever Shine on You", which Keith wrote in 1987, peaked at number 2. Following it were "A Woman's Touch" at number 6, and "Me Too", which became his third number one hit in March 1997. Keith also appeared on The Beach Boys' now out-of-print 1996 album Stars and Stripes Vol. 1 performing a cover of their 1963 hit "Be True to Your School" with the Beach Boys themselves providing the harmonies and backing vocals.

Following a corporate merger, Keith returned to Mercury in 1997. His fourth studio album, Dream Walkin', was also his first produced by James Stroud, who would also serve as Keith's co-producer until 2005. It produced two consecutive number 2 hits with "We Were in Love" and a cover of Sting's 1996 single "I'm So Happy I Can't Stop Crying". Sting also sang duet vocals and played bass guitar on it, and the two also performed the song at the 1997 Country Music Association awards. After this song, the album's title track reached number 5, while "Double Wide Paradise" peaked at number 40.

Keith's last Mercury release was Greatest Hits Volume One in October 1998. The album included twelve of his prior singles and two new songs: the country rap "Getcha Some" and "If a Man Answers". Both were released as singles, with "Getcha Some" reaching the Top 20, but "If a Man Answers" became his first single to miss the Top 40. According to Keith, these two songs were originally to be put on a studio album, but Mercury executives, dissatisfied with the album that Keith had made, chose to put those two songs on a greatest hits package, and asked him to "go work on another album". After he recorded two more songs which the label also rejected, he asked to terminate his contract with the label. After exiting Mercury, Keith co-wrote Shane Minor's debut single "Slave to the Habit" with Chuck Cannon and Kostas.

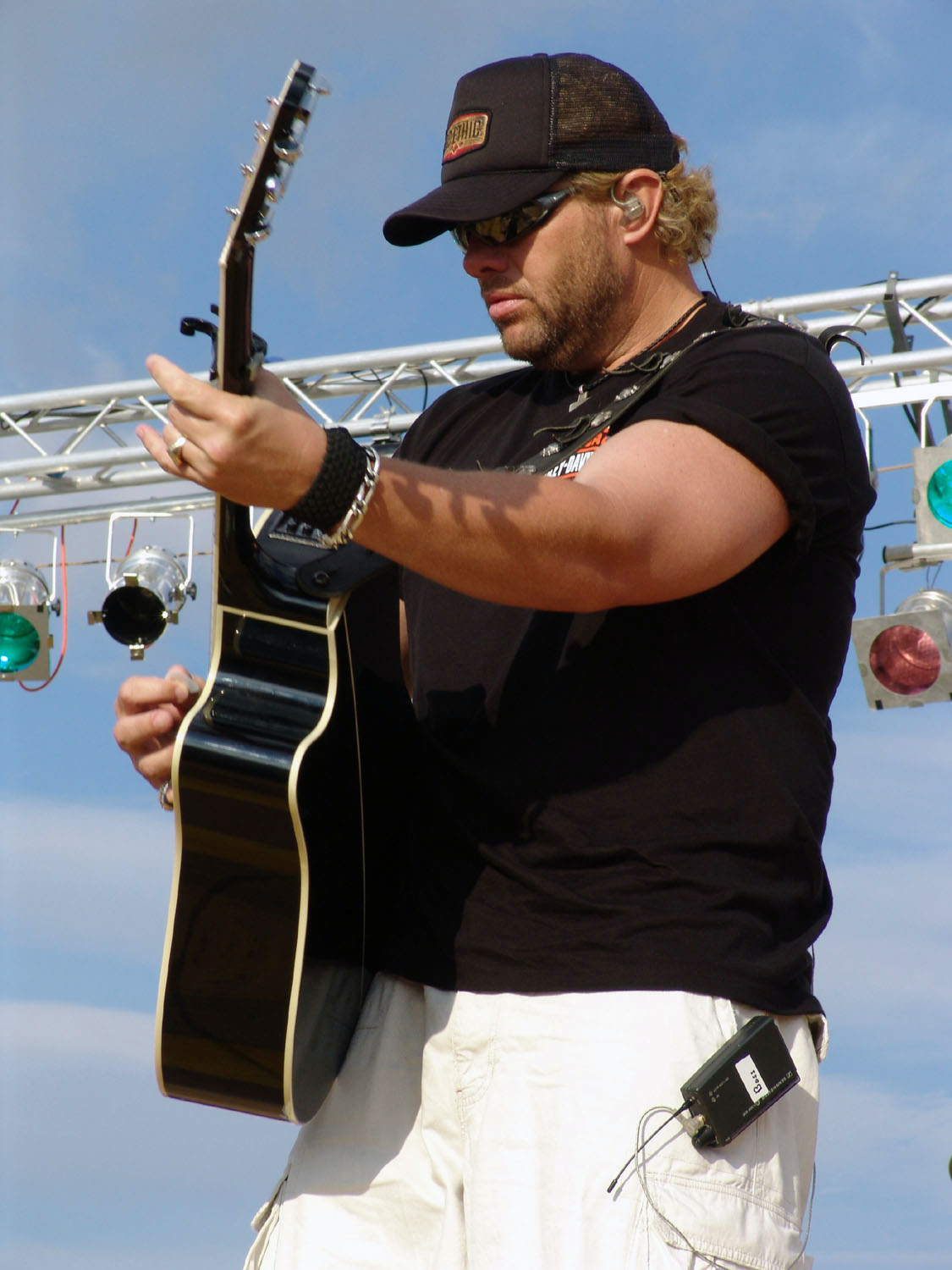
Keith in 2004

=== 1999–2002: How Do You Like Me Now?! and Pull My Chain ===
In 1999, Keith moved to DreamWorks Records' Nashville division, of which Stroud served as president. His first release for the label was "When Love Fades", which also failed to make Top 40. Upon seeing the single's poor performance, Keith requested that it be withdrawn and replaced with "How Do You Like Me Now?!", a song that he wrote with Chuck Cannon, and which had previously been turned down by Mercury. It also served as the title track to his first DreamWorks album, How Do You Like Me Now?! The song spent five weeks at number 1 on the country charts, and became his first top 40 pop hit, with a number 31 peak on the Hot 100. It was also the top country song of 2000 according to the Billboard Year-End chart. The album, which was certified platinum, produced a Top 5 hit in "Country Comes to Town" and another number 1 in "You Shouldn't Kiss Me Like This". It was also his first album to feature songs co-written by Scotty Emerick, who would be a frequent collaborator of Keith's for the next several albums. Steve Huey wrote that this album "had a rough, brash attitude that helped give Keith a stronger identity as a performer." In 2001, Keith won the Academy of Country Music's Top Male Vocalist and Album of the Year awards.

Following this album was Pull My Chain, released in August 2001. The album's three singles—"I'm Just Talkin' About Tonight", "I Wanna Talk About Me", and "My List"—all went to number 1 on the country charts, with the latter two both holding that position for five weeks. "I Wanna Talk About Me", written by Bobby Braddock, also displayed a country rap influence with its spoken-word lyrics. The Country Music Association named "My List" as Single of the Year in 2002. Of Pull My Chain, Erlewine wrote that "this is a bigger, better record than its predecessor, possessing a richer musicality and a more confident sense of humor".

=== 2002–2004: Unleashed and Shock'n Y'all ===
In 2002, Keith released the Unleashed album which included four singles. First was "Courtesy of the Red, White and Blue (The Angry American)", which Keith wrote in 20 minutes as a response to the September 11, 2001 attacks. The song references Keith's father, a United States Army veteran who died that March in a car accident. Both this song and "Who's Your Daddy?" were number 1 hits, with "Rock You Baby" reaching number 13. The last single was "Beer for My Horses", a duet with Willie Nelson which spent six weeks at the top of the country charts. At the time, it was also Keith's highest entry on the Hot 100, at number 22. In July 2003, Keith made a guest appearance on Scotty Emerick's debut single "I Can't Take You Anywhere", which was previously recorded by Keith on Pull My Chain. Emerick's version of the song was his only top 40 country hit, at number 27.

Shock'n Y'all, his eighth studio album, was released in November 2003. The album's title is a pun on the military term "shock and awe". It became his second album from which all singles went to number 1: "I Love This Bar", "American Soldier", and "Whiskey Girl". Also included on the disc were "The Taliban Song" and "Weed with Willie", two live songs recorded with Emerick. The album was followed in late 2004 by Greatest Hits 2, which included three new songs: "Stays in Mexico", "Go with Her", and a cover of Inez and Charlie Foxx's "Mockingbird", recorded as a duet with his daughter, Krystal Keith. "Stays in Mexico" was a number 3 hit on the country charts, while "Mockingbird" peaked at number 27.

Keith's final DreamWorks album was Honkytonk University in early 2005. Lead-off single "Honkytonk U" peaked at number 8, followed by "As Good as I Once Was", which spent six weeks at number 1, and "Big Blue Note" at number 5. After the release of the latter, DreamWorks Records ceased operations.

=== 2005–2024: After DreamWorks ===
On August 31, 2005, Keith founded a new label, Show Dog Nashville. Its first release was his 2006 album White Trash with Money, followed by the soundtrack to Broken Bridges. He also abandoned Stroud as co-producer in favor of Cannon's wife, Lari White. The album included three singles: "Get Drunk and Be Somebody", "A Little Too Late", and "Crash Here Tonight". Big Dog Daddy followed in 2007, with Keith serving as sole producer. Its singles were "High Maintenance Woman", "Love Me If You Can", and "Get My Drink On". "Love Me If You Can" became Keith's first number 1 hit since "As Good as I Once Was" more than two years prior. A two-disc Christmas album, A Classic Christmas, followed later in 2007. In 2008, Keith completed his Biggest and Baddest Tour. On May 6, 2008, he released 35 Biggest Hits, a two-disc compilation featuring most of his singles to date, as well as the new song "She's a Hottie", which peaked at number 13 on Billboard's country songs chart.

Keith released "She Never Cried in Front of Me", which went to number 1 in 2008. Its corresponding album, That Don't Make Me a Bad Guy, followed on October 28, 2008. It was followed by "God Love Her", also a number 1 hit, and "Lost You Anyway". American Ride, in 2009, produced another number 1 in its title track. It was followed by the Top 10 hit "Cryin' for Me (Wayman's Song)", a tribute to basketball player and jazz bassist Wayman Tisdale, a friend of Keith's who died in May 2009.

Bullets in the Gun was released on October 5, 2010. This was Keith's first album not to produce any top 10 singles, with "Trailerhood" reaching number 19, followed by the title track and "Somewhere Else" both at number 12. Keith produced the album with session guitarist Kenny Greenberg and recording engineer Mills Logan.

On October 25, 2011, Clancy's Tavern was released. The album included the single "Made in America", written by Keith along with Bobby Pinson and Scott Reeves, which went to number 1. Following it was "Red Solo Cup", which had previously been made into a music video which became popular. Upon release as a single, "Red Solo Cup" became Keith's best-peaking crossover, reaching number 15 on the Hot 100. The album's final single was "Beers Ago" at number 6 in 2012. In December 2011, Keith was named "Artist of the Decade" by the American Country Awards.

Keith's sixteenth album, Hope on the Rocks, was released in late 2012. It produced only two singles, both of which are top 20 hits: "I Like Girls That Drink Beer" reached at number 17 and the title track peaked at number 18.

In mid-2013, he entered the charts with "Drinks After Work", the first single from his seventeenth album, also titled Drinks After Work. The album's second single is "Shut Up and Hold On".

In October 2014, Keith released "Drunk Americans", the lead single from his eighteenth studio album, 35 MPH Town. In April 2015, Keith released "35 MPH Town", the album's title track and second single. In 2015, Keith was also inducted into the Songwriters Hall of Fame.

In September 2017, Keith released the compilation album, The Bus Songs. The album contains twelve songs: two new, five re-recorded, and five previously released songs. The new songs on the album are "Shitty Golfer" and "Wacky Tobaccy". In the U.S. The Bus Songs topped the Billboard Comedy Albums chart for 11 weeks. It also reached number 6 on the Top Country Albums chart and 38 on the Billboard 200 chart.

In 2021, Keith featured on the Brantley Gilbert single "The Worst Country Song of All Time" with Hardy.

On January 13, 2021, President Trump awarded Keith the National Medal of Arts. The award was given in a closed ceremony, alongside fellow country musician Ricky Skaggs.

On September 28, 2023, after receiving the first Country Icon Award at the People's Choice Country Awards, Keith performed publicly for the first time since his June 2022 cancer diagnosis announcement. His performance of "Don't Let the Old Man In", which was previously used in Clint Eastwood's 2018 film The Mule, received a standing ovation.

Keith's final performance was held in Las Vegas, Nevada, at the Park MGM, on December 14, 2023. His last studio recording was included on Hixtape: Vol. 3: Difftape, a tribute album to Joe Diffie, to which Keith joined Luke Combs on a rendition of Diffie's single "Ships That Don't Come In".

In March 2024, one month after his death, it was announced that Keith would be posthumously inducted into the Country Music Hall of Fame, having been elected just hours after his death.

== Acting career ==
=== Television appearances ===
Keith performed on a series of television advertisements for Telecom USA for that company's discount long-distance telephone service 10-10-220. He also starred in Ford commercials, singing original songs such as "Ford Truck Man" and "Look Again" while driving Ford trucks.

Keith made an appearance at the first Total Nonstop Action Wrestling (then NWA-TNA) weekly pay-per-view on June 19, 2002, where his playing of "Courtesy of the Red, White and Blue" was interrupted by Jeff Jarrett. He would later enter the Gauntlet for the Gold main event and eliminate Jarrett from the match. He appeared the next week, on June 26, and helped Scott Hall defeat Jarrett in singles action.

In 2009, Keith participated in the Comedy Central Roast of Larry the Cable Guy, which aired on March 14, 2009.

Keith received the "Colbert Bump" when he appeared on Comedy Central's The Colbert Report. He holds the distinction of being the only musical artist to have received a five star rating from Stephen Colbert on iTunes. Keith furthered this connection when he appeared in Colbert's 2008 Christmas special as a hunter. Keith also made an appearance as a musical guest on the October 27, 2011, episode of The Colbert Report.

On October 29, 2011, Keith appeared on Fox Channel's Huckabee with former Arkansas Governor Mike Huckabee. He played "Bullets in the Gun" and he joined with Huckabee's house band to play a song at the end of the show.

In December 2018, Keith appeared as a guest on Darci Lynne: My Hometown Christmas.

=== Films ===
In the Autumn of 2005, he filmed Broken Bridges, written by Cherie Bennett and Jeff Gottesfeld, and directed by Steven Goldmann. This feature film from Paramount/CMT Films was released on September 8, 2006. In this contemporary story set in small-town Tennessee, Keith plays Bo Price, a washed-up country musician. The movie also stars Kelly Preston, Burt Reynolds, Tess Harper, and Lindsey Haun.

Keith wrote and starred in the 2008 movie Beer for My Horses, which is based on the 2003 hit single "Beer for My Horses" recorded by Keith and Willie Nelson.

== Business ventures ==
=== Restaurant chain ===
In 2005, Keith opened Toby Keith's I Love This Bar & Grill in Oklahoma City, Oklahoma, as well as Syracuse, New York, and Tulsa, Oklahoma.

Later, new restaurants were opened as a franchise under Scottsdale, Arizona-based Capri Restaurant Group Enterprises LLC, which purchased the master license agreement to build more Toby Keith restaurants nationwide. Capri Restaurant Group was owned by Frank Capri, who opened the first new location in Mesa, Arizona at the Mesa Riverview shopping center.

The chain expanded to many locations across the country, including in Pittsburgh, Pennsylvania; Auburn Hills, Michigan; St. Louis Park, Minnesota; Thackerville, Oklahoma; Auburn Hills, Michigan; Kansas City; Las Vegas; Mesa, Arizona; Peoria, Arizona; St. Louis Park, Minnesota; Foxborough, Massachusetts; Cincinnati, Ohio; Newport News, Virginia; and Denver, Colorado.

The franchise collapsed through the 2010s. By 2020, lawsuits across the country had resulted in Capri and his companies being ordered to pay tens of millions of dollars in civil judgements. Capri was revealed to be an ex-mobster who used the Toby Keith-branded restaurants, along with Rascal Flatts-branded restaurants, to defraud developers.

=== Other ventures ===
In 2009, Keith also established a line of clothing, TK Steelman.

Keith's music career and his various other business ventures made him one of the wealthiest celebrities in the United States. The July 15, 2013, edition of Forbes magazine features Keith on the cover with the caption "Country Music's $500 million man". The article titled "Cowboy Capitalist" by Zack O'Malley Greenburg also contains information regarding Keith's earnings as a musician over the course of his career, such as earning $65 million in the past 12 months, which surpasses the earnings of even more well known musicians such as Jay-Z and Beyoncé and that he has not earned less than $48 million a year over the past five years. Keith wrote at least one No. 1 country single per year over the past 20 years and the partnership between his own label, Show Dog-Universal, and Big Machine Records, which Keith also helped found in 2005.

== Political beliefs ==
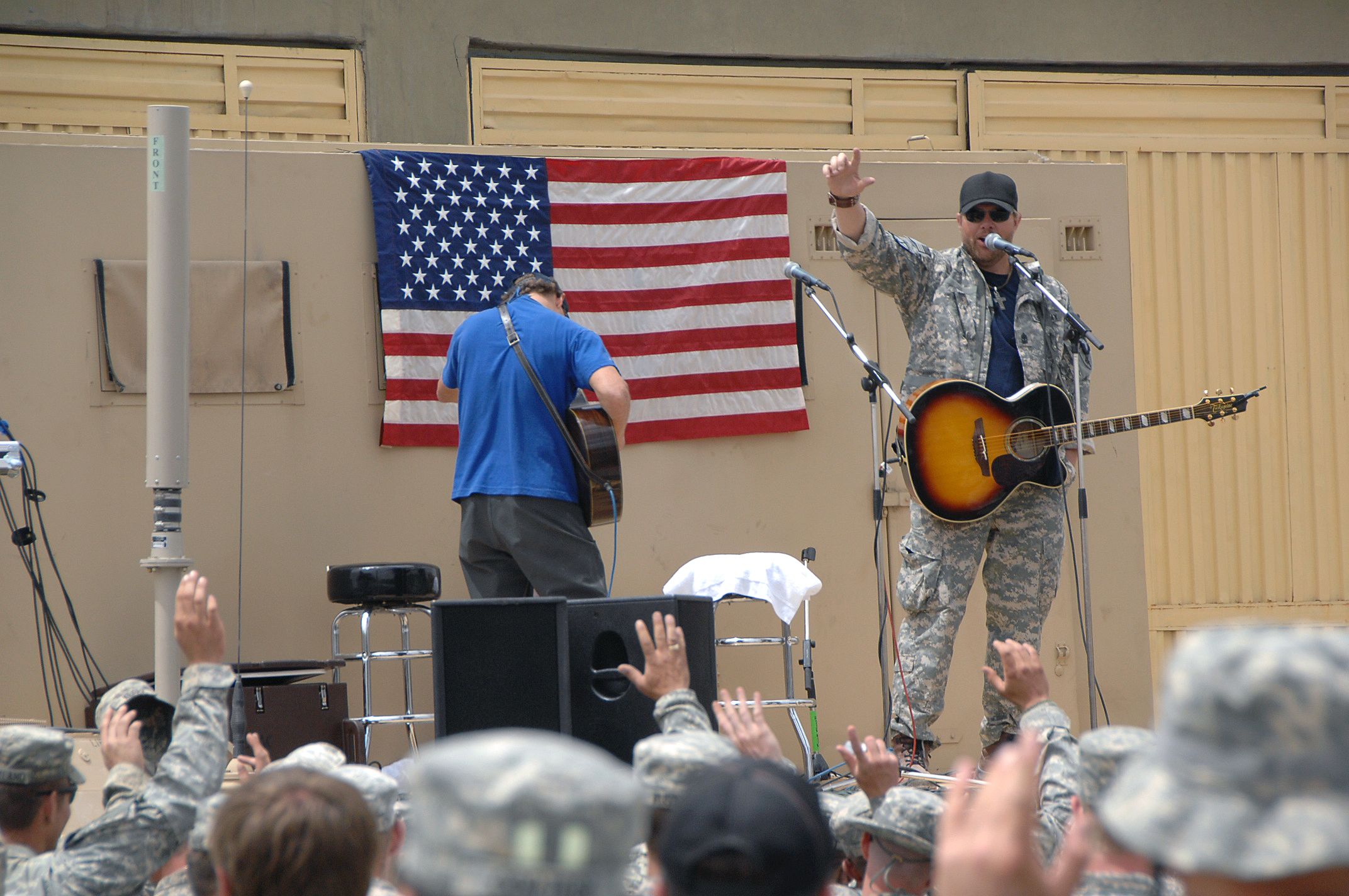
Keith performs for soldiers in Afghanistan, on April 27, 2009.

Keith had made numerous trips to the Middle East, starting in 2002, to perform for those serving in the U.S. military. "My father was a soldier. He taught his kids to respect veterans", said Keith. "It's that respect and the thank-you that we have a military that's in place and ready to defend our nation; our freedom."

In 2004, Keith called himself "a conservative Democrat who is sometimes embarrassed for his party". He endorsed the re-election of President George W. Bush in the 2004 presidential election and performed at a Dallas, Texas, rally on the night before the election. Keith also endorsed Democrat Dan Boren in his successful run in Oklahoma's 2nd congressional district and was good friends with former Democratic New Mexico Governor Bill Richardson.

In a January 2007 interview with Newsday, Keith was asked whether he supported the Iraq War. He responded with "Never did", and said he favors setting a time limit on the campaign. He also said, "I don't apologize for being patriotic [...] If there is something socially incorrect about being patriotic and supporting your troops, then they can kiss my ass on that, because I'm not going to budge on that at all. And that has nothing to do with politics. Politics is what's killing America."

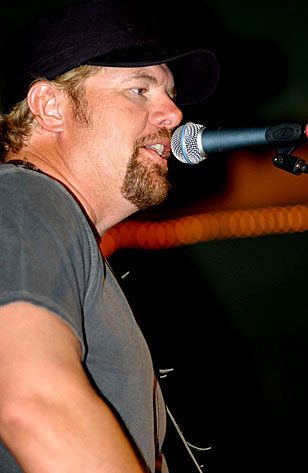
Keith performs for the troops at the O'Callahan's Cantina at Camp Lemonnier, Djibouti, on May 31, 2006.

In April 2008, Keith said that Barack Obama "looks like a great speaker and a great leader. And I think you can learn on your feet in there, so I don't hold people responsible for not having a whole bunch of political background in the House and Senate." His remarks continued, "I think [John] McCain is a great option too." In August 2008, he called Obama "the best Democratic candidate we've had since Bill Clinton".

In October 2008, Keith told CMT that he had left the Democratic Party and he re-registered as an independent. "My party that I've been affiliated with all these years doesn't stand for anything that I stand for anymore", he said. "They've lost any sensibility that they had, and they've allowed all the kooks in. So I'm going independent." He also told CMT that he would likely vote for the Republican ticket, partially because of his admiration for Sarah Palin.

In March 2009, Keith received the Johnny "Mike" Spann Memorial Semper Fidelis Award during a New York ceremony held by the Marine Corps-Law Enforcement Foundation. The trophy is named for the CIA operative (and former Marine Corps captain) who was the first U.S. casualty in the war in Afghanistan. "Spending time with our soldiers around the world is something I've always regarded as a privilege and honor", he said. "I'm certainly happy to accept this award, but I won't forget for a second who's really doing the heavy lifting to keep this country safe. And that's why I'll keep going back and spending time with those good folks every chance I get."

In April 2009, Keith voiced support for Obama on Afghanistan and other decisions: "He hired one of my best friends who I think should run for president someday [...] Gen. James Jones as a national security adviser. He's sending troops into Afghanistan, help is on the way there. And I'm seeing some really good middle range stuff. I'm giving our commander in chief a chance before I start grabbing. So far, I'm cool with it."

=== Courtesy of the Red, White and Blue ===
On March 24, 2001, Keith's father, H.K. Covel, was killed in a car accident. That event and the September 11 attacks in 2001 prompted Keith to write the song "Courtesy of the Red, White, & Blue", a song about his father's patriotism and faith in the United States, originally intended only for live shows. According to Keith, following a performance for military leadership, Commandant of the Marine Corps James L. Jones told Keith it was his "duty as an American citizen" to record the song. As the lead single from the album Unleashed (2002), "Courtesy of the Red, White, & Blue" peaked at number one on the July 20, 2002, Billboard Hot Country Songs chart.

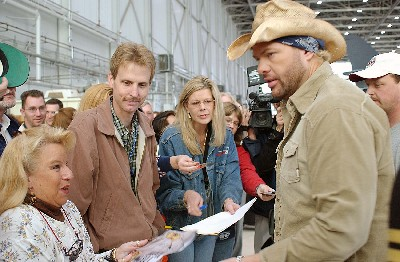
Keith visits with fans during brief breaks in filming the music video "American Soldier" in hangar 1600 at Edwards Air Force Base on November 17, 2003.

ABC invited Keith to perform on a 2002 Fourth of July concert it was producing. According to Keith, he was dropped from the show after host Peter Jennings heard the song "Courtesy of the Red, White and Blue" and rejected it. Keith was further quoted as saying "Isn't he Canadian?", and "I bet Dan Rather wouldn't kick me off his show." Dan Rather, in response, stated "And I'm not gonna be a hypocrite, you wouldn't want me to. I like Peter, he's a good guy." ABC, however, stated that it was the network that did not want to begin the show with an angry song. Jennings later stated that, while the situation was regrettable, opening the show with the song "probably wouldn't set the right tone."

=== Feud with The Dixie Chicks ===
Keith had a public feud with The Chicks—then The Dixie Chicks—over the song "Courtesy of the Red, White, & Blue" in 2002 and over comments they made about President George W. Bush on stage during a concert in London in March 2003. The lead singer of the Chicks, Natalie Maines, publicly stated that Keith's song was "ignorant, and it makes country music sound ignorant". Keith responded by displaying a backdrop at his concerts showing a doctored photo of Maines with Iraqi dictator Saddam Hussein. On May 21, 2003, Maines wore a T-shirt with the letters "FUTK" on the front at the Academy of Country Music Awards. While a spokesperson for the Chicks said that the abbreviation stood for "Friends United in Truth and Kindness", many, including host Vince Gill, took it to be a shot at Keith ("Fuck You Toby Keith"). In an October 2004 appearance on Real Time with Bill Maher, Maines finally confessed that it was indeed a shot at Keith, and that she "thought that nobody would get it."

In August 2003, Keith's representation publicly declared he was done feuding with Maines "because he's realized there are far more important things to concentrate on." Keith was referring specifically to the terminal illness of a former bandmate's daughter, Allison Faith Webb. However, he continued to refuse to say Maines's name, and claimed that the doctored photo was intended to express his opinion that Maines's criticism was an attempt to squelch Keith's free speech.

In April 2008, a commercial spot to promote Al Gore's "We Campaign", involving both Keith and the Chicks, was proposed. However, the idea was eventually abandoned due to scheduling conflicts.

=== Donald Trump ===
On January 19, 2017, Toby Keith performed at the pre-Inaugural "Make America Great Again! Welcome Celebration" held at the Lincoln Memorial in Washington, D.C., in celebration of the beginning of the presidency of Donald Trump. Keith thanked outgoing president Barack Obama for his service and thanked president-elect Trump at the start of the celebration. Keith then played several of his patriotic songs, including "American Soldier", "Made in America", "Beer For My Horses", and "Courtesy of the Red, White and Blue".

At the performance, he dedicated "Courtesy of the Red, White and Blue" to his father who, as he sings early in the song, lost an eye while serving in the U.S. Army. "Responding to the criticism around the performance, Keith said in a statement that 'I don't apologize for performing for our country or military. I performed at events for previous presidents Bush and Obama and over 200 shows in Iraq and Afghanistan for the U.S.O.' Speaking to The Atlantic, he said, more pointedly, that if 'the president of the frickin' United States asks you to do something and you can go, you should go.'"

== Personal life and death ==
Keith married Tricia Lucus on March 24, 1984. He was the father of three children, including Krystal Keith.

Keith's father, H. K. Covel, was killed after a charter bus collided with his car on Interstate 35 on March 24, 2001. The Covel family was awarded $2.8 million for his wrongful death on December 25, 2007. Elias and Pedro Rodriguez, operators of Rodriguez Transportes of Tulsa, and the Republic Western Insurance Co. were found liable, as they failed to equip the bus with properly working air brakes.

Keith planned to be a petroleum engineer.

He was an avid University of Oklahoma sports fan, and Keith was often seen at Oklahoma Sooners games and practices. He was also a fan of professional wrestling, being seen in the front row of numerous WWE shows that took place in Oklahoma, as well as performing "Courtesy of the Red, White, & Blue" live at the first ever TNA Wrestling show on June 19, 2002. He was also a fan of the Pittsburgh Steelers football team. He was a Free Will Baptist.

=== Philanthropy ===
In 2004, Keith helped found Ally's House, a cancer charity named after Allison Webb, the deceased daughter of one of Keith's former bandmates. Webb died a month before her third birthday to Wilms' tumor.

This is a special charity to me. I saw firsthand how a child's cancer diagnosis can devastate a family. Please join me in supporting these kids through Ally's House. We're gonna make it better for the kids.

In 2006, he established the Toby Keith Foundation to build housing for pediatric cancer patients and their families. In late 2013, the foundation built the OK Kids Korral, a place for child OU Medical Center cancer patients to live in. Over two decades since its creation, the annual Toby Keith & Friends Golf Classic has raised more than $15 million for the OK Kids Korral. He described it to The Oklahoman in 2019 as his greatest accomplishment.

Keith filmed a PSA for Little Kids Rock, a national nonprofit that works to restore and revitalize music education in disadvantaged U.S. public schools.

=== Cancer diagnosis and death ===
In June 2022, Keith announced that he had been diagnosed with stomach cancer at the end of 2021, having undergone chemotherapy, radiation, and surgery for the past six months. Keith said that his battle with cancer had been "pretty debilitating" in a December 2022 press release. Keith died in his sleep in Oklahoma, on February 5, 2024, at the age of 62.

Upon news of Keith's death, Oklahoma governor Kevin Stitt ordered U.S. and Oklahoma flags on state property to be flown at half-staff all day February 6 until sunset the following day, "as a show of respect and mourning for the loss of American music legend Toby Keith."

On February 10, 2024, the University of Oklahoma men's basketball team hosted rival Oklahoma State. The song "Red Solo Cup", recorded by Keith, inspired the university to honor him by handing out red Solo cups with any purchase of a drink. Videos of fans singing "Red Solo Cup" while holding their drinks aloft circulated on social media after the game.

Fellow country artists and bands who paid tribute included Dolly Parton, Carrie Underwood, Jason Aldean, Old Dominion, Jelly Roll, Zach Bryan, John Rich, Chely Wright, Lady A, Jake Owen, Luke Combs, Morgan Wallen, Cole Swindell, and others such as First Lady Jill Biden, actor Stephen Baldwin, comedian Stephen Colbert, and radio and television personality Bobby Bones.

== Tours ==
- Brooks and Dunn's Neon Circus and Wild West Show 2001
- Unleashed Tour 2002
  - with Jamie O'Neal, Emerson Drive and Rascal Flatts (Select Dates)
- USO 2002–13 (11 tours, visiting 15 countries and 3 naval ships)
- Shock'N Y'all Tour 2003
  - with Blake Shelton
- Big Throwdown Tour 2004
  - with Lonestar and Gretchen Wilson
  - with Sawyer Brown and Terri Clark
- Big Throwdown Tour II 2005
  - with Jo Dee Messina
- White Trash With Money Tour 2006
- Hookin' Up and Hangin' Out Tour 2007
  - with Miranda Lambert, Trace Adkins, Josh Gracin
- Big Dog Daddy Tour 2007
- Biggest and Baddest Tour 2008–09
  - with Montgomery Gentry and Trailer Choir
- America's Toughest Tour 2009
  - with Trace Adkins Also Julianne Hough (Few Dates)
- Toby Keith's American Ride Tour 2010
  - with Trace Adkins and James Otto
- Locked and Loaded Tour 2011
  - with Eric Church and JT Hodges
- Live in Overdrive Tour
  - with Brantley Gilbert
- Hammer Down Tour 2013
  - with Kip Moore
- Hammer Down Under Tour 2014
  - With Kellie Pickler and Eli Young Band
- Shut Up and Hold On Tour 2014
  - With Colt Ford and Krystal Keith
- Good Times and Pick Up Lines Tour 2015
  - With Eli Young Band and Chris Janson
- Interstates and Tailgates Tour 2016
  - With Eric Paslay
- Should've Been a Cowboy XXV 2018

== Discography ==
=== Studio albums ===
- Toby Keith (1993)
- Boomtown (1994)
- Blue Moon (1996)
- Dream Walkin' (1997)
- How Do You Like Me Now?! (1999)
- Pull My Chain (2001)
- Unleashed (2002)
- Shock'n Y'all (2003)
- Honkytonk University (2005)
- White Trash with Money (2006)
- Big Dog Daddy (2007)
- That Don't Make Me a Bad Guy (2008)
- American Ride (2009)
- Bullets in the Gun (2010)
- Clancy's Tavern (2011)
- Hope on the Rocks (2012)
- Drinks After Work (2013)
- 35 MPH Town (2015)
- Peso in My Pocket (2021)

=== Compilation albums ===
- Greatest Hits Volume One (1998)
- 20th Century Masters: The Millennium Collection (2003)
- Greatest Hits 2 (2004)
- 35 Biggest Hits (2008)
- The Bus Songs (2017)
- Greatest Hits: The Show Dog Years (2019)

=== Christmas albums ===
- Christmas to Christmas (1995)
- A Classic Christmas (2007)

=== Number-one singles ===
- "Should've Been a Cowboy"
- "Who's That Man"
- "Me Too"
- "How Do You Like Me Now?!"
- "You Shouldn't Kiss Me Like This"
- "I'm Just Talkin' About Tonight"
- "I Wanna Talk About Me"
- "My List"
- "Courtesy of the Red, White, & Blue (The Angry American)"
- "Who's Your Daddy?"
- "Beer for My Horses" – duet with Willie Nelson
- "I Love This Bar"
- "American Soldier"
- "Whiskey Girl"
- "As Good as I Once Was"
- "Love Me If You Can"
- "She Never Cried in Front of Me"
- "God Love Her"
- "American Ride"
- "Made in America"

== Filmography ==
- Broken Bridges (2006) also starring Kelly Preston and Lindsey Haun
- CMT Music Awards (2003–2012) Co-Host With Pamela Anderson and Kristen Bell
- Beer for My Horses (2008)
