= Show Dog Nashville =

American record label

- Founded: 2001 (Universal South); 2005 (Show Dog)
- Founder: Tony Brown, Tim DuBois (Universal South); Toby Keith (Show Dog)
- Distributor(s): Thirty Tigers
- Genre: Country
- Country of origin: U.S.
- Location: Nashville, Tennessee

Show Dog Nashville is an American independent record label specializing in country music artists. It was founded in 2005 by singer Toby Keith. It was later merged with Universal South Records into Show Dog-Universal Music in December 2009 until it was re-activated in late 2015. Currently, it is distributed by Thirty Tigers.

== History ==
Universal South Records was started in 2001 under Universal Music Group by record producers Tony Brown and Tim DuBois. The label specialized in country music artists, including Joe Nichols, Randy Houser, Phil Vassar and Marty Stuart, as well as alternative country acts Shooter Jennings and Cross Canadian Ragweed. In 2005 it partnered with the talent show Nashville Star, offering a recording contract to Season 3 winner Erika Jo. George Canyon, another Nashville Star contestant, also recorded for the label.

Brown and DuBois stepped down from Universal South in 2006, with Mark Wright, also a record producer, taking their place as label president.

Show Dog Nashville was formed in 2005 by Toby Keith shortly after the dissolution of DreamWorks Records, the label to which he was signed at the time. DreamWorks executive Scott Borchetta was its CEO, and his own Big Machine Records label originally shared much of its staff. In March 2006, Show Dog and Big Machine split into separately staffed labels, although Keith retained his financial stake in Big Machine. Acts releasing works for Show Dog included Carter's Chord, Trailer Choir, Mica Roberts, Lindsey Haun and Martin Johnson.

In December 2009, Show Dog Records and Universal South merged to form Show Dog-Universal Music. One month later Trace Adkins left Capitol Records Nashville (which later became part of UMG's Nashville unit after UMG bought EMI in 2012) to become the first post-merger signee to the label, and the label's roster was announced. Singer-songwriter Josh Thompson, previously with Sony Music Nashville, joined the roster in September 2012. By the summer of 2015, Toby Keith and his daughter Krystal Keith had become the only artists signed to the label, but more recently Clay Walker, Waterloo Revival, and Lance Carpenter joined the label.

== Acts on Show Dog Nashville ==
- Krystal Keith
- Kimberly Kelly
- Clay Walker

== Former artists ==
- Trace Adkins
- Carter's Chord
- Joel Crouse
- Scotty Emerick
- Rose Falcon
- Flynnville Train
- Lindsey Haun
- Toby Keith
- JT Hodges
- Randy Houser
- Rebecca Lynn Howard
- Jessie James
- Sarah Johns
- Joe Nichols
- Mica Roberts
- Rushlow Harris
- Josh Thompson
- Trailer Choir
- Phil Vassar
- Waterloo Revival

== Acts formerly signed to Universal South ==
- Baylie Brown
- Bering Strait
- George Canyon
- Kevin Costner and Modern West
- Cross Canadian Ragweed
- John Mellencamp
- Katrina Elam
- Eli Young Band
- The Elms
- Andy Gibson
- The Lost Trailers
- Regie Hamm
- Jennifer Hanson
- Randy Houser
- Matt Jenkins
- Shooter Jennings
- Erika Jo
- Holly Lamar
- Rockie Lynne
- Pat Green
- McHayes
- Dean Miller
- Allison Moorer
- Joe Nichols
- The Notorious Cherry Bombs
- Lee Roy Parnell
- Jonathan Singleton
- Sons of Sylvia
- Judson Spence
- Marty Stuart
- Phil Vassar
- Matthew West
- Amanda Wilkinson
- Holly Williams
