= Greatest Hits Volume One (Toby Keith album) =

Greatest hits album by Toby Keith
- Released: October 20, 1998
- Recorded: 1993–1998
- Genre: Country
- Length: 50:45
- Label: Mercury
- Producer: Nelson Larkin; Harold Shedd; James Stroud; Toby Keith

Toby Keith chronology
Dream Walkin' (1997)	Greatest Hits Volume One (1998)	How Do You Like Me Now?! (1999)

Singles from Greatest Hits Volume One
- 1. "Getcha Some" Released: September 7, 1998; 2. "If a Man Answers" Released: February 8, 1999

Professional ratings
Review scores
Source	Rating
Allmusic	4/5 stars

Greatest Hits Volume One is the first compilation album by American country music artist Toby Keith. It was released on October 20, 1998, by Mercury Records and was his final album for the label, where he had been from the start of his career in 1993 to 1998. It features singles from his first four studio albums, as well as the newly recorded tracks "Getcha Some", and "If a Man Answers". Both of these tracks were released as singles, in 1998 and 1999, respectively. While "Getcha Some" peaked at #18 on the Hot Country Songs charts, "If a Man Answers" reached #44 on the same chart, becoming the first single of Keith's career to miss the Top 40. It was Keith's only compilation album not to feature singles in chronological order until the release of Greatest Hits: The Show Dog Years in 2019.

In April 2003, the album was certified Double Platinum by the RIAA.

== Track listing ==
No.	Title	Writer(s)	Length
1.	"Getcha Some"	Toby Keith, Chuck Cannon	3:16
2.	"If a Man Answers"	Keith, Cannon	3:36
3.	"Should've Been a Cowboy"	Keith	3:30
4.	"Dream Walkin'"	Keith, Cannon	3:56
5.	"A Little Less Talk and a Lot More Action"	Keith Hinton, Jimmy Alan Stewart	2:49
6.	"Does That Blue Moon Ever Shine on You"	Keith	3:50
7.	"I'm So Happy I Can't Stop Crying" (duet with Sting)	Sting	4:01
8.	"We Were in Love"	Cannon, Allen Shamblin	4:19
9.	"You Ain't Much Fun"	Keith, Carl Goff Jr.	2:27
10.	"Who's That Man"	Keith	4:54
11.	"Wish I Didn't Know Now"	Keith	3:26
12.	"Big Ol' Truck"	Keith	3:41
13.	"Me Too"	Keith, Cannon	3:52
14.	"He Ain't Worth Missing"	Keith	3:08

== Personnel on New Tracks ==
Adapted from liner notes.

- Mike Brignardello - bass guitar
- Mark Casstevens - acoustic guitar
- Dan Dugmore - steel guitar
- Paul Franklin - steel guitar
- Kenny Greenberg - electric guitar
- Owen Hale - drums
- Roger Hawkins - drums
- David Hood - bass guitar
- Clayton Ivey - piano
- Toby Keith - lead vocals
- Will McFarland - electric guitar
- Terry McMillan - harmonica, percussion
- Steve Nathan - keyboards, organ
- Brent Rowan - electric guitar
- John Wesley Ryles - background vocals
- Dennis Wilson - background vocals
- Curtis Young - background vocals

== Charts ==
=== Weekly charts ===
Chart (1998)	Peak position
US Billboard 200	61
US Top Country Albums (Billboard)	5

=== Year-end charts ===
Chart (1999)	Position
US Top Country Albums (Billboard)	18

== Certifications ==
Region	Certification	Certified units/sales
United States (RIAA)	2× Platinum	2,000,000^{^}
^{^} Shipments figures based on certification alone.
