= How You Like Me Now? (disambiguation) =

How You Like Me Now? is a 2009 song by English rock band The Heavy.

How You Like Me Now? may also refer to:

- How Ya Like Me Now, 1987 album by Kool Moe Dee
  - "How Ya Like Me Now" (song), title track from above album
- "How You Like Me Now", 2011 song by Alexis Jordan from Alexis Jordan
- "How U Like Me Now?" 2015 song by Yung Lean and ThaiBoy Digital from the deluxe edition of Warlord

== See also ==
- How Do You Like Me Now?!, 1999 album by Toby Keith
  - "How Do You Like Me Now?!" (song), title track from above album
- How You Love Me Now, 2008 song by Hey Monday from Hold On Tight
