= I Was Brought to My Senses =

Single by Sting

from the album Mercury Falling
- Released: 2 September 1996
- Studio: Lake House (Wiltshire)
- Genre: Alternative rock; Adult contemporary
- Length: 5:48
- Label: A&M
- Songwriter: Sting
- Producers: Sting; Hugh Padgham

Sting singles chronology
"You Still Touch Me" (1996)	"I Was Brought to My Senses" (1996)	"I'm So Happy I Can't Stop Crying" (1996)

Audio
- "I Was Brought To My Senses" on YouTube

"I Was Brought to My Senses" is a song by English musician Sting. It appears on his fifth studio album, Mercury Falling (1996), and was released by A&M as the album's third single on 2 September 1996.

== Background ==
After an opening section in 6/8, the song shifts into 7/8, making it one of many Sting tracks to use odd time signatures; other examples include "I Hung My Head" (9/8) and the previous album's "Seven Days" (5/4).

"I Was Brought to My Senses" is a song about gaining a greater appreciation for nature. The song starts in a folk-ballad style before transitioning to a full band performance with what Sting called "a Brazilian vibe".

Upon its release as a single, "I Was Brought to My Senses" peaked at number 31 in the UK. Unlike the other three singles released from Mercury Falling, the song failed to chart in the US. In contrast with previous singles which primarily consisted of remixes, the single release included the non-album tracks "This Was Never Meant to Be" and The Pirate's Bride".

== Critical reception ==
Kevin Courtney from Irish Times wrote, "I walked out this morning/It was like a veil had been removed from before my eyes, sings the Sting, over a nice, jazzy backing, before expounding on the wonders of nature and the joys of life. I suppose Sting is trying to tell us that love is a bit of a religious experience, but this insipid tune won't win many converts."

== Live performances ==
In March 2026, Sting performed the song as part of a live concert titled "Sounds like Art" he gave at the Rijksmuseum in Amsterdam.

== Track listing ==
All tracks written by Sting.

- CD maxi-single
1. "I Was Brought to My Senses" (Steve Lipson Remix) – 4:43
2. "This Was Never Meant to Be" – 3:08
3. "The Pirate's Bride" – 5:00
4. "I Was Brought to My Senses" – 5:49
- "Mini-greatest hits" maxi-single
1. "I Was Brought to My Senses" (Steve Lipson Remix) – 4:43
2. "When We Dance" – 5:55
3. "If I Ever Lose My Faith in You" – 4:30
4. "If You Love Somebody Set Them Free" – 4:14

== Charts ==
Chart (1996)	Peak position
Australia (ARIA)	133
Italy Airplay (Music & Media)	9
UK Singles (OCC)	31
UK Airplay (Music Week)	41
