= How Do You Like Me Now?! (song) =

Single by Toby Keith

from the album How Do You Like Me Now?!
- B-side: "When Love Fades"
- Released: November 22, 1999
- Genre: Country
- Length: 3:29
- Label: DreamWorks Nashville
- Songwriters: Toby Keith; Chuck Cannon
- Producers: James Stroud; Toby Keith

Toby Keith singles chronology
"When Love Fades" (1999)	"How Do You Like Me Now?!" (1999)	"Country Comes to Town" (2000)

"How Do You Like Me Now?!" is a song co-written and recorded by American country music artist Toby Keith. It was released in November 1999 as the second single and title track from his album of the same name. Keith wrote it with Chuck Cannon.

== Background and writing ==
Keith discussed the inspiration for the song on his website in 2000. "Initially, I said, 'Here's my title: "You Never Loved Me Before, So How Do You Like Me Now?'" It's one of my catch-phrases. A lot of people become successful after they've been told they won't ever be, so people can relate to this. It can be about an old flame or a boss or a teacher -whatever it means to each individual. It was a fun song to write."

Keith had originally recorded the song near the end of his contract with Mercury Records Nashville in the late 1990s. According to a 2005 interview with Billboard, Keith had the album How Do You Like Me Now?! completed, but label executives rejected the entire album except for two songs: "Getcha Some" and "If a Man Answers", both of which were put on his 1998 Greatest Hits album. After he recorded two more songs which were also rejected, he asked to terminate his contract with Mercury, and purchased the rights to the rest of the album. Upon the album's release in late 1999, both the album and its lead single, "When Love Fades", were performing poorly on the charts; as a result, Keith asked that "When Love Fades" be withdrawn as a single in favor of "How Do You Like Me Now?!" Keith stated that DreamWorks executives were "scared to put it out", but within five days of Keith's request, "When Love Fades" was withdrawn and "How Do You Like Me Now?!" was released.

At the 2001 Academy of Country Music awards, the song was nominated for Single of the Year and Song of the Year. The song remains one of Keith's signature songs.

== Content ==
The song discusses a high school underdog's attraction to the female valedictorian of his high school—a beautiful woman who ignored him at the time, wondering if the woman remembers him now that he is famous.

== Music video ==
The song's music video premiered on The CMT Delivery Room on November 26, 1999, and was directed by Michael Salomon. It features Toby Keith singing at a hometown football field in the middle of the night.

== Critical reception ==
Deborah Evans Price, of Billboard magazine reviewed the song favorably, calling it a "great little tune about the underdog fulfilling his dreams, and the story is wrapped in a melody that demands attention." She goes on to call Keith's performance "feisty" and say that the production "just percolates."

Jessica Andrews references both Keith and the song in her 2002 single "There's More to Me Than You".

== In popular culture ==
Toby Keith makes a cameo in The Dukes of Hazzard TV movie Hazzard in Hollywood where he performs the song at the Hazzard County Festival.

== Track listings ==
- CD single
1. "How Do You Like Me Now?!" (Rock Version) – 3:30
2. "How Do You Like Me Now?!" (Live Version) – 3:42
3. "How Do You Like Me Now?!" (Club Version) – 4:13

== Chart positions ==
"How Do You Like Me Now?!" debuted at number 57 on the U.S. Billboard Hot Country Singles & Tracks for the week of November 20, 1999. The song spent five weeks at Number One on the Billboard U.S. Hot Country Songs chart beginning in March 2000. The song also became the fourth number one hit of his career, his first since "Me Too" in 1997, and was the first number-one single for the now defunct DreamWorks Nashville label. In December 2000, Billboard declared "How Do You Like Me Now?!" to be the number one country single of 2000. Following Keith's death on February 5, 2024, the single would re-enter the Hot Country Songs chart at number 23 on the chart week dated February 17, 2024, being one of five Toby Keith songs to re-enter the chart that week.

It was his first major crossover hit, peaking at number 31 on the U.S. Billboard Hot 100.

=== Peak positions ===
1999–2000 weekly chart performance for "How Do You Like Me Now?!"
Chart (1999–2000)	Peak position
Canada Country Singles (RPM)	1
US Billboard Hot 100	31
US Hot Country Songs (Billboard)	1

2024 weekly chart performance for "How Do You Like Me Now?!"
Chart (2024)	Peak position
US Hot Country Songs (Billboard)	23

=== Year-end charts ===
Year-end chart performance for "How Do You Like Me Now?!"
Chart (2000)	Position
US Country Songs (Billboard)	1
US Hot 100 (Billboard)	82

== Certifications ==
Region	Certification	Certified units/sales
United States (RIAA)	2× Platinum	2,000,000^{‡}
^{‡} Sales+streaming figures based on certification alone.

== Parodies ==
On his 2000 album Just Another Day in Parodies, country music parodist Cledus T. Judd recorded a parody entitled "How Do You Milk a Cow." This version peaked at number 67 on Hot Country Songs.
