= You Still Touch Me =

1996 single by Sting

Single by Sting

from the album Mercury Falling
- Released: 29 April 1996
- Studio: Lake House (Wiltshire, England)
- Length: 3:46
- Label: A&M
- Songwriter: Sting
- Producers: Sting; Hugh Padgham

Sting singles chronology
"Let Your Soul Be Your Pilot" (1996)	"You Still Touch Me" (1996)	"I Was Brought to My Senses" (1996)

Music video
- "You Still Touch Me" on YouTube

"You Still Touch Me" is a song by the English musician Sting, released as the second single from his fifth studio album Mercury Falling. Featuring a distinct soul influence, the song reached number 27 in Sting's native UK, becoming the second of three singles from the album to reach the top 40.

== Background ==
Much like "Let Your Soul Be Your Pilot", "You Still Touch Me" was influenced by soul musicians such as Otis Redding and Marvin Gaye and was intended as a homage to soul music in general. Sting described the track as "a standard song of love and loss".

"You Still Touch Me" peaked at number 27 in the UK, marking a downward turn from Sting's previous single. In the US, it reached number 60, an improvement over "Let Your Soul Be Your Pilot", which peaked at number 86. Much like the previous single, "You Still Touch Me" was most successful in Canada, matching its predecessor's number-seven placement.

== Track listings ==
All tracks written by Sting, except "Lullaby to An Anxious Child", written with Dominic Miller.

CD1

1. "You Still Touch Me" (Edit) – 3:18
2. "Lullaby to An Anxious Child" – 1:56
3. "Beneath a Desert Moon" – 4:28
4. "You Still Touch Me" – 3:46

CD2

1. "You Still Touch Me" (Edit) – 3:18
2. "Sister Moon" (Hani Commissioned Club Mix) – 7:56
3. "Sister Moon" (Hani Commissioned Dub Mix) – 7:12

US CD single

1. "You Still Touch Me" – 3:18
2. "Twenty Five to Midnight" – 4:07

== Charts ==
Chart (1996)	Peak position
Canada Top Singles (RPM)	7
Italy Airplay (Music & Media)	5
UK Singles (Official Charts)	27
UK Airplay (Music Week)	9
US Billboard Hot 100	60
US Adult Pop Airplay (Billboard)	19

== Release history ==
Region	Date	Format(s)	Label(s)	Ref.
United Kingdom	29 April 1996	CD; cassette	A&M	
United States	30 April 1996	Contemporary hit radio	A&M	
Japan	1 June 1996	CD	A&M	
