= Shape of My Heart (Sting song) =

Single by Sting

from the album Ten Summoner's Tales
- B-side: "Fragilidad"
- Released: 23 August 1993
- Length: 4:41
- Label: A&M
- Songwriters: Sting; Dominic Miller
- Producers: Sting; Hugh Padgham

Sting singles chronology
"Fields of Gold" (1993)	"Shape of My Heart" (1993)	"Nothing 'Bout Me" (1993)

Music video
- "Sting - Shape of My Heart (Official Music Video)" on YouTube

"Shape of My Heart" is a song by British musician Sting, released in August 1993 by A&M Records as the fifth single from his fourth solo album, Ten Summoner's Tales (1993). The song was written by Sting and guitarist Dominic Miller and features harmonica played by Larry Adler. It was used for the end credits of the 1994 film Léon and within the 1993 film Three of Hearts. Despite failing to reach the top 50 in the UK upon its release, it has become a pop classic and one of Sting's works most closely associated with his solo career. It has been sampled in many tracks since its release, including "Shape" (2003) by Sugababes and "Rise & Fall" (2003) by Craig David (with Sting credited as a featured artist). Ann-Margret sang a cover over the opening credits of her 1996 movie Blue Rodeo.

The song's guitar riff was also sampled by Nas for his track "The Message" in 1996, Monica on her 1998 song "Take Him Back". and Carl Thomas on his 2000 song "Emotional". It was also sampled by Avicii, for his track "Forever Yours". The song was released after his death, with Sting and Miller credited as songwriters. It was also interpolated on Hikaru Utada's debut album First Love, the best-selling Japanese album of all time; Juice WRLD on the worldwide hit "Lucid Dreams" (2018); on "You’re Mines Still" (2020) by rapper BLEU and in "Parkstone Drive" by Russ. The song was also covered by British metalcore band Oceans Ate Alaska in 2018 as part of the Songs That Saved My Life compilation album released by Hopeless Records.

== Background and writing ==
Sting explained that through "Shape of My Heart", he wanted to tell the story of a "card player, a gambler who gambles not to win but to try to figure out something; to figure out some kind of mystical logic in luck, or chance; some kind of scientific, almost religious law."

Miller recalled that the guitar riff originated from a warm-up exercise centered around sixth chords akin to the music of Chopin. He opted to avoid the third degree of the chord and intended for the chord sequence to resemble the work of John McLaughlin. When approached by Sting to develop the riff into a full song, Miller said that it was merely a warm-up exercise, but he and Sting nonetheless spent the morning developing it into a structured musical composition and recording a demo. Sting then went for a walk while playing the demo on his headphones. He felt that the music told the story of a gambler, and returned with a set of lyrics to accompany the composition.

== Critical reception ==
Upon the release, Larry Flick from Billboard magazine wrote, "Impeccable playing, singing, and composing add up to a ballad for all forms of fondness, all seasons of affection. The mood of this beautiful track is so strong, its lilting guitar and harmonica so finely woven into the lyric, that it greets the ears like a spontaneous prayer, a lover's timeless promise. [...] Certain to be a smash at top 40 and AC, joining 'Fields of Gold' as one of the standards of the decade." Alan Jones from Music Week gave the song two out of five, saying, "This understated track from Ten Summoner's Tales most closely resembles 'It's Probably Me'. Commercially it will probably get a leg-up into the Top 40 from the addition of previously unreleased live tracks and its use as the main theme to the new William Baldwin movie Three of Hearts." Anthony DeCurtis from Rolling Stone described the song as "brooding". Andrew Collins from Select noted the "musty deck-of-cards symbolism in the otherwise pretty 'Shape of My Heart'."

== Music video ==
The accompanying music video for "Shape of My Heart" was directed by Doug Nichol and premiered in September 1993. It was filmed at Sting's Lake House in Wiltshire.

== Live performances ==
On 5 March 2026, a recording of Sting performing "Shape of My Heart" live at Rijksmuseum was released on his YouTube channel. The live performance is also set to be included on his live album The Night Watch: Live at the Rijksmuseum in June 2026.

== Charts ==
=== Weekly charts ===
Weekly chart performance for "Shape of My Heart"
Chart (1993–1994)	Peak position
Canada Top Singles (RPM)	44
Iceland (Íslenski Listinn Topp 40)	10
Israel (Israeli Singles Chart)	7
UK Singles (Official Charts)	57
UK Airplay (Music Week)	30

Chart (2016)	Peak position
France (SNEP)	96

Chart (2026)	Peak position
Greece International (IFPI)	87
Israel International Airplay (Media Forest)	12

=== Year-end charts ===
Year-end chart performance for "Shape of My Heart"
Chart (1993)	Position
Iceland (Íslenski Listinn Topp 40)	85

== Certifications ==
Certifications and sales for "Shape of My Heart"
Region	Certification	Certified units/sales
Denmark (IFPI Danmark)	Gold	45,000^{‡}
Italy (FIMI)	Gold	35,000^{‡}
Japan (RIAJ) digital	Gold	100,000^{*}
New Zealand (RMNZ)	Gold	15,000^{‡}
Spain (Promusicae)	Gold	30,000^{‡}
United Kingdom (BPI)	Silver	200,000^{‡}
Streaming
Greece (IFPI Greece)	Platinum	2,000,000^{†}
^{*} Sales figures based on certification alone.^{‡} Sales+streaming figures based on certification alone.^{†} Streaming-only figures based on certification alone.
