= Toby Keith (album) =

Studio album by Toby Keith
- Released: April 20, 1993
- Recorded: 1992–93
- Studio: Alpine, Music Mill, and Scruggs (Nashville)
- Genre: Country
- Length: 32:53 (original release); 40:57 (2018 reissue)
- Label: Mercury
- Producer: Nelson Larkin; Harold Shedd

Toby Keith chronology
Toby Keith (1993)	Boomtown (1994)

Singles from Toby Keith
- 1. "Should've Been a Cowboy" Released: February 8, 1993; 2. "He Ain't Worth Missing" Released: June 28, 1993; 3. "A Little Less Talk and a Lot More Action" Released: November 9, 1993; 4. "Wish I Didn't Know Now" Released: February 28, 1994

Professional ratings
Review scores
Source	Rating
AllMusic	3/5 stars

Toby Keith is the debut studio album by American country music artist Toby Keith. Released on April 20, 1993 by Mercury Records, the album sold more than one million copies in the United States, earning RIAA platinum certification.

The first single, "Should've Been a Cowboy", spent two weeks atop the Billboard Hot Country Songs chart Follow up singles from Toby Keith included "He Ain't Worth Missing", "A Little Less Talk and a Lot More Action" and "Wish I Didn't Know Now". All of which were top 5 hits on the Hot Country Songs charts.

With the exception of "Some Kinda Good Kinda Hold on Me" and "A Little Less Talk and a Lot More Action", the entire album was written solely by Keith." A Little Less Talk and a Lot More Action" was previously recorded by Hank Williams, Jr. on his 1992 album Maverick.

A remastered 25th anniversary edition, retitled Should've Been a Cowboy as a nod to the hit single from the album, was released on November 30, 2018, with three new bonus tracks added.

== Track listing ==
All tracks are written by Toby Keith except where noted.

No.	Title	Writer(s)	Length
1.	"Should've Been a Cowboy"		3:30
2.	"He Ain't Worth Missing"		3:05
3.	"Under the Fall"		3:22
4.	"Some Kinda Good Kinda Hold on Me"	Chuck Cannon & Jimmy Alan Stewart	3:31
5.	"Wish I Didn't Know Now"		3:26
6.	"Ain't No Thang"		3:27
7.	"Valentine"		3:34
8.	"A Little Less Talk and a Lot More Action"	Keith Hinton & Jimmy Alan Stewart	2:49
9.	"Mama Come Quick"		3:23
10.	"Close but No Guitar"		2:46
Total length:			32:53

25th Anniversary bonus tracks
No.	Title	Length
11.	"Tossin' and Turnin'"	2:48
12.	"I'll Still Call You Baby"	3:33
13.	"Daddy Mac"	1:52
Total length:		40:57

== Personnel ==
Musicians

- Michael Black – background vocals
- Mark Casstevens – acoustic guitar, harmonica
- Michael Crossno – electric guitar
- Thom Flora – background vocals
- Sonny Garrish – steel guitar, Dobro
- Carl "Chuck" Goff Jr. – bass guitar
- Clayton Ivey – keyboards
- Jim Kimball – electric guitar
- Gary Lunn – bass guitar
- Scott Marcha – drums
- Don Potter – acoustic guitar
- Milton Sledge – drums
- Denis Solee – saxophone
- Troy Turner – keyboards
- John Willis – electric guitar
- Dennis Wilson – background vocals
- Lonnie Wilson – background vocals
- Reggie Young – electric guitar

Technical

- Jim Cotton – engineering
- Nelson Larkin – producer
- Ron "Snake" Reynolds – overdubs
- Joe Scaife – engineer
- Harold Shedd – producer
- Ronnie Thomas – digital editing
- Hank Williams – mastering

== Charts ==
=== Weekly charts ===
Chart (1993)	Peak position
US Billboard 200	99
US Top Country Albums (Billboard)	17
US Heatseekers Albums (Billboard)	1

=== Year-end charts ===
Chart (1993)	Position
US Top Country Albums (Billboard)	47
Chart (1994)	Position
US Top Country Albums (Billboard)	31

== Certifications ==
Region	Certification	Certified units/sales
Canada (Music Canada)	Gold	50,000^{^}
United States (RIAA)	Platinum	1,000,000^{^}
^{^} Shipments figures based on certification alone.
