= Love Is Stronger Than Justice (The Munificent Seven) =

1993 single by Sting

Single by Sting

from the album Ten Summoner's Tales
- Released: 24 September 1993
- Length: 5:12
- Label: A&M
- Songwriter: Sting
- Producers: Sting; Hugh Padgham

Sting singles chronology
"Shape of My Heart" (1993)	"Love Is Stronger Than Justice (The Munificent Seven)" (1993)	"Nothing 'Bout Me" (1994)

"Love Is Stronger Than Justice (The Munificent Seven)" is a song by English singer-songwriter Sting. It was included as the second track on his fourth studio album, Ten Summoner's Tales. In September 1993, the song was issued as a single in certain European countries and peaked at number 75 in Germany.

== Background ==
Sting wrote "Love Is Stronger Than Justice (The Munificent Seven" in a time signature that alternates between septuple meter in the verses and common time during the chorus. He started the song by writing a musical sequence in (7/8) time and decided to base the lyrics around an interpretation of The Magnificent Seven where a group of seven brothers would fight banditos and each find a wife to marry. In a 1993 interview with RCD magazine, Sting mentioned that he wanted the song to have a twist.

There could be a reward...they'd each get a wife! And so...the funny story. There's only one woman and so one of the seven has to get rid of the others...I used the time signature for the idea of seven wives for seven brothers.

Sting commented that the concept of love being stronger than justice was an "ironic statement" that resulted in a "very tongue-in-cheek song". Musically, the song opens with a guitar lick from Dominic Miller that leads into a groove in (7/8) time that features different rhythmic variations on the snare drum played by Vinnie Colaiuta. The verses are polytonal and comprise a single chord, with the melody following an A minor pentatonic scale primarily utlising a ladder of thirds and the bass ostinato suggesting an A dominant seventh sharp ninth chord with an added thirteenth note. The song then segues into a country feel largely consisting of the tonic, subdominant, and dominant scale degrees. The song ends with a piano solo performed by David Sancious.

During the week of 6 November 1993, "Love is Stronger Than Justice" was listed as a "chartbound" song for the European Hit Radio Top 40 chart on the pan-European publication Music & Media, indicating that the song had received gains in airplay on reporting stations in the format, albeit not enough to chart on the listing's top 40. That same month, the song reached a peak of No. 75 on the German singles chart.

== Critical reception ==
Anthony DeCurtis of Rolling Stone thought that the song's arrangement in septuple meter rendered it unique for a song with undertones of country and western music. He also thought that the song's lyrics were infused with "a gnarly weave of ideas, jokes, mythic allusions and contradictory emotions." J. D. Considine wrote in The Baltimore Sun that "Love Is Stronger Than Justice (The Munificent Seven)" was the album's "most elaborate musical prank" that "burlesques spaghetti westerns, snickers at pop sentimentality and teases the trend toward country - all in just over five minutes. It sounds almost dizzying, described like that, but as diverse as the comic elements might be, the song as a whole is seamlessly melodic." In their review for the Houston Chronicle, Marty Racine labelled "Love Is Stronger Than Justice (The Munificent Seven)" as one of the best songs on Ten Summoner's Tales in part due to its "terrific chorus that echoes South African township music".

== Chart performance ==
Chart (1993)	Peak position
Germany (GfK)	75
