= Let Your Soul Be Your Pilot =

1996 single by Sting

Single by Sting

from the album Mercury Falling
- Released: 19 February 1996
- Studio: Lake House (Wiltshire, England)
- Length: 6:43
- Label: A&M
- Songwriter: Sting
- Producers: Sting; Hugh Padgham

Sting singles chronology
"This Cowboy Song" (1995)	"Let Your Soul Be Your Pilot" (1996)	"You Still Touch Me" (1996)

Music video
- "Let Your Soul Be Your Pilot" on YouTube

"Let Your Soul Be Your Pilot" is a song by the English musician Sting, released on 19 February 1996, by A&M Records, as the lead single from his fifth solo studio album, Mercury Falling (1996). The soul-influenced track was inspired by a friend suffering from AIDS, and the impact such an event can have on one's outlook on life. "Let Your Soul Be Your Pilot" reached the top 20 in Sting's native UK. The song was nominated for Best Male Pop Vocal Performance at the 1997 Grammy Awards.

== Background ==
"Let Your Soul Be Your Pilot" was inspired by a friend of Sting's who was suffering from AIDS. Sting described it as a "song about death, or dealing with death in a way that offers some sort of hope".

Musically, the song was influenced by Stax artists such as Otis Redding; Percy Sledge and Aretha Franklin were also listed as significant influences. Fitting in with this theme, Sting brought in the Memphis Horns to play on the track.

"Let Your Soul Be Your Pilot" became a top 20 sales hit in the UK, peaking at number 15, and was a bigger airplay hit, topping Music & Media's UK airplay chart and making the top five of Music Week's listing. Radio stations such as BRMB had picked up the song before its official release as a single, achieving over 620 plays across the country around this time. It was initially added to the playlists of 20 radio stations across the country and increased to 92 two weeks later. By the time "Let You Soul Be Your Pilot" had exited the sales top 40, the song had reached 877 plays over the span of one week.

The single further bolstered by the release of a dance mix, which was carried predominantly by more contemporary radio stations. Paul Williams of Music Week commented that the dance mix "made him appeal to people who wouldn't necessarily go out and buy a Sting record."

In the US, most of its success was concetrated to adult alternative radio, reaching number three on Billboard's Triple-A chart while only getting to 86 on the main Hot 100. It was also a top ten hit in Canada, reaching number seven on RPM's Hit Tracks chart.

== Track listings ==
All tracks were written by Sting, except "Someone to Watch Over Me", written by George and Ira Gershwin.

Standard CD single

1. "Let Your Soul Be Your Pilot" (Edit) – 4:31
2. "Englishman in New York" – 4:27
3. "The Bed's Too Big Without You" – 6:05
4. "Let Your Soul Be Your Pilot" (LP Version) – 6:41

CD maxi–single (US and Japan)

1. "Let Your Soul Be Your Pilot" (LP Version) – 6:41
2. "The Bed's Too Big Without You" – 6:05
3. "Someone to Watch Over Me" – 4:00
4. "Englishman in New York" – 4:27

Remixes by A & G Division

1. "Let Your Soul Be Your Pilot" (A & G Classic Edit) – 4:38
2. "Let Your Soul Be Your Pilot" (A & G Full Testament Mix) – 12:32
3. "Let Your Soul Be Your Pilot" (A & G Great Divide Mix) – 7:40
4. "Let Your Soul Be Your Pilot" (A & G Great Divide Dub) – 12:29

== Charts ==
=== Weekly charts ===
Weekly chart performance
Chart (1996)	Peak position
Australia (ARIA)	65
Canada Top Singles (RPM)	7
Estonia (Eesti Top 20)	10
Europe (Eurochart Hot 100)	61
Europe Airplay (European Hit Radio)	1
Europe ACE Top 25 (Music & Media)	1
Europe Channel Crossovers (Music & Media)	1
Finland (Suomen virallinen lista)	14
Finland Airplay (Radiosoittolista)	2
France Airplay (Music & Media)	5
Germany (GfK)	58
Italy (Musica e dischi)	17
Italy Airplay (Music & Media)	4
Netherlands (Single Top 100)	43
Poland Airplay (Music & Media)	1
Spain Airplay (Music & Media)	6
UK Singles (Official Charts)	15
UK Airplay (Music Week)	4
UK Club (Record Mirror)	10
US Billboard Hot 100	86
US Adult Alternative Airplay (Billboard)	3

=== Year-end charts ===
Year-end chart performance
Chart (1996)	Position
Canada Top Singles (RPM)	55

== Release history ==
Region	Date	Format(s)	Label(s)	Ref(s).
United States	13 February 1996	Contemporary hit radio	A&M	
United Kingdom	19 February 1996	CD; cassette	A&M	
Japan	26 February 1996	Maxi-CD; mini-CD	A&M	
