= Mercury Falling =

Studio album by Sting
- Released: 4 March 1996
- Recorded: 1995
- Studios: Lake House (Wiltshire); Steerpike Studio
- Genres: Alternative rock; adult contemporary
- Length: 52:24
- Languages: English; French ("La Belle Dame Sans Regrets")
- Label: A&M
- Producers: Sting; Hugh Padgham

Sting chronology
Fields of Gold: The Best of Sting 1984–1994 (1994)	Mercury Falling (1996)	The Very Best of Sting & The Police (1997)

Singles from Mercury Falling
- 1. "Let Your Soul Be Your Pilot" Released: 19 February 1996; 2. "You Still Touch Me" Released: 29 April 1996; 3. "I Was Brought to My Senses" Released: 2 September 1996; 4. "I'm So Happy I Can't Stop Crying" Released: 18 November 1996

Mercury Falling is the fifth studio album by English musician Sting. It was released on 4 March 1996 through A&M Records and was produced by Sting alongside longtime producer Hugh Padgham. The album features many tracks which see elements of soul and country music integrated to a greater extent than on past releases. Supporting musicians on the album include frequent collaborators Dominic Miller on guitar, Kenny Kirkland on keyboards, Vinnie Colaiuta on drums, and Branford Marsalis on tenor and soprano saxophone.

Mercury Falling was a success, reaching the top 10 in 18 countries, but failed to match the success of its predecessors. None of its four singles—"Let Your Soul Be Your Pilot", "You Still Touch Me", "I Was Brought to My Senses", and "I'm So Happy I Can't Stop Crying"—were hits across all regions, although the former two did perform well in the UK and especially Canada, where both reached the top 10. The album has been certified Platinum in three different countries (US, UK and Canada) and Gold in nine others. In 1997, the album earned Sting two Grammy nominations—Best Pop Vocal Album and Best Male Pop Vocal Performance for "Let Your Soul Be Your Pilot".

== Music and lyrics ==
The album's title, "mercury falling" appears as the first and last lyrics heard on the album. The lyric was the first written for the album (for "The Hounds of Winter"), and Sting later felt the phrase evoked the mood of the record and its variety of styles: "there are so many styles on this record and it darts around from genre to genre and back again. It's a very mercurial record, and it seemed to be the right thing to call the record."

"I Hung My Head" is one of many songs on the album played in an odd time signature, in this case 9/8. Johnny Cash performed a cover of the song on American IV: The Man Comes Around, his final studio album released during his lifetime.

"Let Your Soul Be Your Pilot" displays a significant soul influence; Sting has stated that the music of artists such as Otis Redding and Aretha Franklin heavily inspired the track. Expanding on this theme, the Memphis Horns were brought in to play on the track. The lyrics were inspired by a friend who was suffering from AIDS, and how such an event can affect someone's outlook on life. Sting described the song as "a song about death, or dealing with death in a way that offers some sort of hope. I actually think it's quite an uplifting song - the intent is for it to be uplifting." Keyboardist Gerry Richardson performs on this song, the first time he had worked with Sting since the late 1970s when they were part of the jazz group Last Exit.

"I Was Brought to My Senses" is a song about gaining a greater appreciation for nature. It starts off as a folk ballad in 6/8, before moving to the main part of the song, which features what Sting called "a Brazilian vibe" and is played in 7/4.

The track "Twenty Five to Midnight" was excluded from the American and Canadian releases. It was included in the CD-Maxi Single of "You Still Touch Me", as the fourth track.

"La Belle Dame sans regrets" is sung entirely in French; its title translates to "the beautiful lady with no regrets". The song was co-written with Sting's guitarist Dominic Miller. Miller wrote the song's music as a tribute to Brazilian musician Antônio Carlos Jobim, composing it in his hotel room the day he heard about Jobim's death. Sting had guested on Jobim's album Antônio Brasileiro, which was released posthumously in 1994.

"Valparaiso" was used during the closing credits of the 1996 film White Squall.

== Reception ==
Professional ratings
Review scores
Source	Rating
AllMusic	2.5/5 stars
Chicago Tribune	2/4 stars
Entertainment Weekly	(A−)
Houston Chronicle	3/5 stars
Los Angeles Times	3.5/4 stars
Robert Christgau	(bad record)
Rolling Stone	3/5 stars

Mercury Falling was released in March 1996. It reached number four in Sting's native UK and number five in the US, becoming his fifth straight studio album to make the top 5 in both countries. The album also achieved top ten placements in 16 other countries in addition to the European Albums Chart (where it topped the chart).

"Let Your Soul Be Your Pilot" was released as the album's first single on 19 February 1996. It became a top 20 hit in the UK, peaking at number 15, but stalled at number 86 in the US. It did, however, reach number 3 on the Billboard Adult Alternative Airplay chart. The single was most successful in Canada, where it peaked at number 7. "You Still Touch Me", the album's second single, reached number 27 in the UK. In the US, it was more successful than its predecessor, peaking at number 60. The song matched the previous single's chart placement in Canada, giving Sting yet another number 7 hit. A remixed version of "I Was Brought to My Senses", done by Steve Lipson, served at the album's third single. It barely missed the top 30 in the UK and failed to chart in the US. "I'm So Happy I Can't Stop Crying" was the album's final single. Toby Keith released a cover of the song as a single from his album Dream Walkin', Sting appeared on the track which gave him his only country hit.

== Track listing ==
All tracks are written by Sting, except "La Belle Dame sans regrets" written by Sting and Dominic Miller.

Mercury Falling
No.	Title	Length
1.	"The Hounds of Winter"	5:27
2.	"I Hung My Head"	4:40
3.	"Let Your Soul Be Your Pilot"	6:41
4.	"I Was Brought to My Senses"	5:48
5.	"You Still Touch Me"	3:46
6.	"I'm So Happy I Can't Stop Crying"	3:56
7.	"All Four Seasons"	4:28
8.	"Twenty Five to Midnight"	4:09
9.	"La Belle Dame sans regrets"	5:17
10.	"Valparaiso"	5:27
11.	"Lithium Sunset"	2:38
Total length:		52:24

Note: "Twenty Five to Midnight" was excluded from the original American and Canadian pressings of the album.

=== B-sides ===
Title	Source
"The Bed's Too Big Without You"	"Let Your Soul Be Your Pilot"
"Lullaby to An Anxious Child"	"You Still Touch Me"
"Beneath a Desert Moon"	"You Still Touch Me"
"Twenty Five to Midnight"	"You Still Touch Me"
"This Was Never Meant to Be"	"I Was Brought to My Senses"
"The Pirate's Bride"	"I Was Brought to My Senses"
"Giacomo's Blues"	"I'm So Happy I Can't Stop Crying"
"Moonlight"	"I'm So Happy I Can't Stop Crying"

== Personnel ==
- Sting – vocals, bass, arrangements
- Kenny Kirkland – keyboards
- Gerry Richardson – Hammond organ (3)
- Dominic Miller – guitars, arrangements (8)
- B. J. Cole – pedal steel guitar (6, 11)
- Vinnie Colaiuta – drums
- Andrew Love – saxophones (2, 3, 5, 7, 8)
- Branford Marsalis – tenor saxophone (3), soprano saxophone (4)
- Wayne Jackson – trumpet (2, 3, 5, 7, 8)
- Kathryn Tickell – fiddle (4), Northumbrian pipes (9)
- Lance Ellington – additional vocals (3, 4)
- Shirley Lewis – additional vocals (3, 4)
- Monica Reed Price – additional vocals (3, 4)
- Tony Walters – additional vocals (3, 4)
- East London Gospel Choir – choir (3, 4)
- Graeme Perkins – vocal session coordinator (3, 4)

=== Production ===
- Sting – producer
- Hugh Padgham – producer, engineer, mixing
- Simon Osborne – engineer
- Bob Ludwig – mastering
- Gateway Mastering (Portland, Maine) – mastering location
- Danny Quatrochi – personal technical assistant
- Jeri Heiden – art direction, design
- William Claxton – photography
- Fabrizio Ferri – photography
- Miles Copeland III – management
- Kim Turner – management

== Accolades ==
=== Grammy Awards ===
Year	Nominee / work	Award	Result
1997	Mercury Falling	Best Pop Vocal Album	Nominated
1997	"Let Your Soul Be Your Pilot"	Best Male Pop Vocal Performance	Nominated

== Charts ==
=== Weekly charts ===
Chart (1996)	Peak position
Argentine Albums (CAPIF)	1
Australian ARIA Album Chart	14
Austrian Albums Chart	1
Belgian Albums Chart (Flanders)	7
Belgian Albums Chart (Wallonia)	4
Canadian RPM Albums Chart	8
Danish Albums Chart	7
Dutch Albums Chart	3
Estonian Albums (Eesti Top 10)	1
European Albums Chart	1
Finnish Albums Chart	1
French SNEP Albums Chart	3
German Media Control Albums Chart	2
Hungarian Albums (MAHASZ)	4
Japanese Albums Chart	4
New Zealand Albums Chart	7
Norwegian VG-lista Albums Chart	4
Portuguese Albums Chart	9
Scottish Albums Chart	7
Spanish Albums Chart	6
Swedish Albums Chart	2
Swiss Albums Chart	1
UK Albums Chart	4
US Billboard 200	5

=== Year-end charts ===
Chart (1996)	Position
Austrian Albums Chart	24
Canadian Albums Chart	43
Dutch Albums Chart	37
French Albums Chart	66
German Albums Chart	27
Italian Albums Chart	10
Japanese Albums Chart	118
Swiss Albums Chart	43
UK Albums Chart	50
US Billboard 200	80

== Certifications and sales ==
Region	Certification	Certified units/sales
Australia (ARIA)	Gold	35,000^{^}
Austria (IFPI Austria)	Gold	25,000^{*}
Canada (Music Canada)	Platinum	100,000^{^}
Finland (Musiikkituottajat)	Gold	24,617
Germany (BVMI)	Gold	250,000^{^}
Italy	—	210,000
Japan (RIAJ)	Gold	193,600
Netherlands (NVPI)	Gold	50,000^{^}
Poland (ZPAV)	Gold	20,000^{*}
Spain (Promusicae)	Gold	50,000^{^}
Switzerland (IFPI Switzerland)	Gold	25,000^{^}
United Kingdom (BPI)	Platinum	300,000^{^}
United States (RIAA)	Platinum	1,000,000^{^}
Summaries
Europe (IFPI)	Platinum	1,000,000^{*}
^{*} Sales figures based on certification alone.^{^} Shipments figures based on certification alone.
