= Boomtown (Toby Keith album) =

Studio album by Toby Keith
- Released: September 27, 1994
- Studio: Alpine, Scruggs (Nashville)
- Genre: Country
- Length: 36:17
- Label: Mercury
- Producer: Nelson Larkin; Harold Shedd

Toby Keith chronology
Toby Keith (1993)	Boomtown (1994)	Christmas to Christmas (1995)

Singles from Boomtown
- 1. "Who's That Man" Released: July 19, 1994; 2. "Upstairs Downtown" Released: November 22, 1994; 3. "You Ain't Much Fun" Released: March 14, 1995; 4. "Big Ol' Truck" Released: July 10, 1995

Professional ratings
Review scores
Source	Rating
Allmusic	3/5 stars

Boomtown is the second studio album by American country music artist Toby Keith. It was released on September 27, 1994, by Mercury Records. The album produced four hit singles for Keith on the U.S. Billboard Hot Country Songs chart between 1994 and 1995 with "Who's That Man" (#1), "Upstairs Downtown" (#10), "You Ain't Much Fun" (#2) and "Big Ol' Truck" (#15). The album was also certified platinum by the RIAA for U.S. sales of one million copies.

== Track listing ==
No.	Title	Writer(s)	Length
1.	"Who's That Man"	Toby Keith	4:54
2.	"Big Ol' Truck"	Keith	3:42
3.	"Victoria's Secret"	Keith, Wayne Perry	3:42
4.	"No Honor Among Thieves"	Nathan Crow, David Wills	3:11
5.	"Upstairs Downtown"	Keith, Carl Goff Jr.	4:26
6.	"You Ain't Much Fun"	Keith, Goff	2:26
7.	"In Other Words"	Tony Haselden, Tim Mensy	3:34
8.	"Woman Behind the Man"	Keith, Perry	3:09
9.	"Life Was a Play (The World a Stage)"	Johnny McCollum, Pal Rakes, Nelson Larkin	3:29
10.	"Boomtown"	Keith	3:44

== Personnel ==
- Michael Black - background vocals
- Tom Flora - background vocals
- Sonny Garrish - steel guitar, Dobro
- Tim Gonzales - harmonica
- Owen Hale - drums
- Clayton Ivey - keyboards
- Toby Keith - lead vocals
- Gary Lunn - bass guitar
- Danny Parks - electric guitar
- Don Potter - acoustic guitar
- Ron "Snake" Reynolds - percussion
- Milton Sledge - drums
- Russell Terrell - background vocals
- Dennis Wilson - background vocals
- Reggie Young - electric guitar

== Charts ==
=== Weekly charts ===
Chart (1994)	Peak position
Canadian Country Albums (RPM)	5
US Billboard 200	46
US Top Country Albums (Billboard)	8

=== Year-end charts ===
Chart (1995)	Position
Canada Top 50 Country Albums (RPM)	33
US Top Country Albums (Billboard)	36

== Certifications ==
Region	Certification	Certified units/sales
United States (RIAA)	Platinum	1,000,000^{^}
^{^} Shipments figures based on certification alone.
