= Upstairs Downtown =

Single by Toby Keith

from the album Boomtown
- B-side: "Woman Behind the Man"
- Released: November 22, 1994
- Recorded: 1994
- Genre: Country
- Length: 4:26
- Label: PolyGram/Polydor Nashville 851136
- Songwriters: Toby Keith, Carl Goff Jr.
- Producers: Nelson Larkin, Harold Shedd

Toby Keith singles chronology
"Who's That Man" (1994)	"Upstairs Downtown" (1994)	"You Ain't Much Fun" (1995)

"Upstairs Downtown" is a song co-written and recorded by American country music artist Toby Keith. The song was released in November 1994 as the second single from his 1994 album Boomtown. The song peaked at number 10 on the Billboard charts in both the United States and Canada. Keith wrote the song with Carl Goff Jr.

== Content ==
A ballad, "Upstairs Downtown" centers on the life of a young woman, who has just aged into adulthood and is moving out on her own for the first time. The song centers on the struggles of the woman, who is trying to earn a living and gain life skills.

The first verses of the song recounts the woman's restlessness and desire to move from her rural community ("the woods," as described in the song) to the big city. Her triumphs are highlighted when she moves into her apartment, gets her own telephone line and gets a job at a local grocery store.

However, she finds that living on her own, particularly with no moral support from family close by, is tougher than she thought it would be. She soon loses her job and is unable to pay her bills. In the end, the young woman decides to move back home "to the woods." The video starlet is Oklahoma native Amanda Breeden.

Keith expressed his displeasure with the song being released as a single, saying that it was a "nice song for the album", but that he did not feel it was a strong single, and would have preferred that "You Ain't Much Fun" be the second single instead; "Fun" ended up being released as the third single in March 1995 and would fare better, peaking at #2, behind Clint Black's "Summer's Comin'".

== Music video ==
The music video was directed by Marc Ball, and premiered on CMT on November 26, 1994, as their "Hot Shot Video of the Week".

== Chart performance ==
"Upstairs Downtown" debuted at number 73 on the Hot Country Singles & Tracks chart for the week of December 3, 1994.

Chart (1994–1995)	Peak position
Canada Country Singles (RPM)	10
US Hot Country Songs (Billboard)	10
