= Edward Duke (antiquary) =

English Antiquarian

Edward Duke (1779–1852), was an English antiquary.

== Life ==
Born in Hungerford on 24 September 1779, Duke was the second son of Edward Duke of Lake House, Wiltshire, and Fanny, daughter of John Field of Islington. He was educated at Magdalen Hall, Oxford, where he graduated B.A. 1803, M.A. 1807. He was ordained in 1802, and engaged in clerical work at Turkdean, Gloucestershire, and Salisbury. In 1805 he came into the estates and the mansion at Lake, which had been in his family since 1578.

Duke devoted his leisure to antiquities. In company with Sir R. C. Hoare he explored the tumuli on his estates, and the antiquities there discovered were described in Hoare's Ancient Wilts, and were preserved in the museum at Lake House. Between 1823 and 1828 Duke contributed to the Gentleman's Magazine, chiefly on Wiltshire antiquities. In his Druidical Temples of the County of Wilts (1846), he maintained that the early inhabitants of Wiltshire had "pourtrayed a vast planetarium or stationary orrery on the face of the Wiltshire downs", the earth being represented by Silbury Hill, and the sun and planets, revolving round it, by seven "temples", four of stone and three of earth, placed at their proper distances. A review in the Christian Remembrancer said "it has seldom been our unhappy fate to wade through a book, in the pages of which we could find less instruction of any kind, or a larger number of the most puerile absurdities".

He also published Prolusiones Historicæ, or Essays illustrative of the Halle of John Halle, citizen … of Salisbury (temp. Henry VI and Edward IV), vol. i. (only), Salisbury, 1837, 8vo, about John Halle's Hall, a medieval hall building in Salisbury. Duke was an active Wiltshire magistrate, and a fellow of the Society of Antiquaries and of the Linnean Society.

In 1813 he married Harriet, daughter of Henry Hinxman of Ivy Church, near Salisbury, by whom he had four sons and four daughters. He died at Lake House on 28 August 1852, aged 73. The eldest son, Edward, entered the church and succeeded to the estates.
