= Dream Walkin' =

Studio album by Toby Keith
- Released: June 24, 1997
- Genre: Country
- Length: 40:18
- Label: Mercury
- Producer: James Stroud; Toby Keith

Toby Keith chronology
Blue Moon (1996)	Dream Walkin' (1997)	Greatest Hits Volume One (1998)

Singles from Dream Walkin'
- 1. "We Were in Love" Released: June 9, 1997; 2. "I'm So Happy I Can't Stop Crying" Released: October 6, 1997; 3. "Dream Walkin'" Released: January 26, 1998

Professional ratings
Review scores
Source	Rating
AllMusic	4/5 stars

Dream Walkin' is the fifth studio album by American country music artist Toby Keith. It was released on June 24, 1997, by Mercury Records and is his final album on the label. It was certified gold by the RIAA for sales of 500,000 copies. Four singles were released from the album; in order of release, they were: "We Were in Love", "I'm So Happy I Can't Stop Crying", "Dream Walkin'", and "Double Wide Paradise". Respectively, these reached #2, #2, #5, and #40 on the Hot Country Songs charts, making the first studio album of his career not to produce any Number One hits. After the album's release, Keith departed from Mercury Records, and signed contracts with DreamWorks Records in 1999.

"I'm So Happy I Can't Stop Crying" was originally recorded by British rock artist Sting on his 1996 album Mercury Falling, from which it was released as a single. The version featured here is a duet with Sting, and is Sting's only entry on the country music charts.

"Jacky Don Tucker (Play by the Rules, Miss All the Fun)" was later included in the soundtrack to the 2006 film Broken Bridges, which was also Keith's debut as an actor. It was earlier included in the 2000 movie The Dukes of Hazzard: Hazzard in Hollywood!

A music video was filmed for "Tired", although it was not released as a single.

== Track listing ==
No.	Title	Writer(s)	Length
1.	"We Were in Love"	Chuck Cannon, Allen Shamblin	4:20
2.	"Dream Walkin'"	Toby Keith, Cannon	3:56
3.	"You Don't Anymore"	Keith, Eric Silver	3:28
4.	"Jacky Don Tucker (Play by the Rules, Miss All the Fun)"	Keith, Cannon	2:58
5.	"Tired"	Keith, Cannon	4:42
6.	"Double Wide Paradise"	Paul Thorn, Billy Maddox	3:43
7.	"Yet"	Keith, Cannon	4:18
8.	"She Ran Away with a Rodeo Clown"	Keith	2:56
9.	"Strangers Again"	Keith	3:25
10.	"I'm So Happy I Can't Stop Crying" (duet with Sting)	Sting	3:59
11.	"I Don't Understand My Girlfriend"	Keith, Jim Femino	2:33
Total length:			40:18

== Personnel ==
- Mike Brignardello – bass guitar on all tracks except "I'm So Happy I Can't Stop Crying"
- Larry Byrom – acoustic guitar
- Dan Dugmore – steel guitar
- Paul Franklin – steel guitar
- Owen Hale – drums
- Dann Huff – electric guitar
- Toby Keith – lead vocals
- Clayton Ivey – piano
- Michael Landau – electric guitar
- Brent Mason – electric guitar
- Steve Nathan – keyboards
- Brent Rowan – electric guitar
- Sting – bass guitar and duet vocals on "I'm So Happy I Can't Stop Crying"
- Paul Thorn – background vocals on "Double Wide Paradise"
- Dennis Wilson – background vocals
- Curtis Wright – background vocals
- Curtis Young – background vocals

== Charts ==
=== Weekly charts ===
Chart (1997)	Peak position
US Billboard 200	107
US Top Country Albums (Billboard)	8

=== Year-end charts ===
Chart (1997)	Position
US Top Country Albums (Billboard)	66
Chart (1998)	Position
US Top Country Albums (Billboard)	44

== Certifications ==
Region	Certification	Certified units/sales
United States (RIAA)	Gold	500,000^{^}
^{^} Shipments figures based on certification alone.
