= Country Comes to Town =

Single by Toby Keith

from the album How Do You Like Me Now?!
- B-side: "When Love Fades"
- Released: May 15, 2000
- Recorded: 1999
- Genre: Country
- Length: 3:38
- Label: DreamWorks Nashville
- Songwriter: Toby Keith
- Producers: James Stroud; Toby Keith

Toby Keith singles chronology
"How Do You Like Me Now?!" (1999)	"Country Comes to Town" (2000)	"You Shouldn't Kiss Me Like This" (2000)

"Country Comes to Town" is a song written and recorded by American country music artist Toby Keith. It was released in May 2000 as the third single from his album How Do You Like Me Now?!. It peaked at number 4 in the United States, and number 3 in Canada.

== Content ==
It is an up-tempo song that's firmly rooted in the Muscle Shoals sound. The song discusses how once the sun goes down, "country comes to town".

== Music video ==
The music video was filmed in Chicago, Illinois, and was directed by Keary Asmussen, and premiered on CMT on May 18, 2000. It features Keith singing at the famous House of Blues.

== Chart positions ==
"Country Comes to Town" debuted at number 60 on the Hot Country Singles & Tracks chart for the week of May 27, 2000. It reached the Top 5 on the Billboard Country Charts in September 2000, peaking at #4.

Chart (2000)	Peak position
Canada Country Singles (RPM)	3
US Billboard Hot 100	54
US Hot Country Songs (Billboard)	4

=== Year-end charts ===
Chart (2000)	Position
US Country Songs (Billboard)	32
