= Getcha Some =

Single by Toby Keith

from the album Greatest Hits Volume One
- B-side: "Should've Been a Cowboy"
- Released: September 7, 1998
- Genre: Country
- Length: 3:17
- Label: Mercury
- Songwriters: Toby Keith; Chuck Cannon
- Producers: James Stroud; Toby Keith

Toby Keith singles chronology
| "Double Wide Paradise" (1998) | "Getcha Some" (1998) | "If a Man Answers" (1999) |

"Getcha Some" is a song co-written and recorded by American country music artist Toby Keith. It was released in September 1998 as the lead single from his compilation album Greatest Hits Volume One. It peaked at number 18 on the U.S. Billboard Hot Country Songs chart in the U.S. and number 22 on the Canadian RPM Country Tracks chart. It also peaked at number 2 on the U.S. Billboard Bubbling Under Hot 100 chart. This song is also included on his 2008 compilation album, 35 Biggest Hits. It was written by Keith with Chuck Cannon.

== Content ==
The song is a moderate up-tempo with spoken-word verses. It is about a man who is trying to achieve higher things in life. First he needs love and to get the love he needs money. Once he gets the money, he gets the love but after a while he still doesn't feel fulfilled and realizes he needs to have children.

"Getcha Some" is cited as an example of country-rap, due to the use of a strong beat and rhythmically spoken, essentially amelodic lyrics. This is also shown in Keith's 2001 single "I Wanna Talk About Me", as well as his 2011 single "Red Solo Cup".

== Music video ==
The music video, directed by Michael Salomon, takes place at a natural history museum in the "Hall of Human Behavior". It involves Keith watching interactive exhibits of real people going through various life events as described in the song. It premiered in August 1998.

== Chart positions ==
"Getcha Some" debuted at number 63 on the U.S. Billboard Hot Country Singles & Tracks for the week of September 12, 1998.

| Chart (1998) | Peak position |
|---|---|
| Canada Country Singles (RPM) | 22 |
| US Bubbling Under Hot 100 (Billboard) | 2 |
| US Hot Country Songs (Billboard) | 18 |
