= Ten Summoner's Tales =

Studio album by Sting
- Released: 1 March 1993
- Recorded: June–December 1992
- Studios: Lake House, Wiltshire, England
- Genres: Pop rock; soft rock; jazz rock
- Length: 52:31
- Labels: A&M; PolyGram (Hong Kong)
- Producers: Hugh Padgham; Sting

Sting chronology
The Soul Cages (1991)	Ten Summoner's Tales (1993)	Fields of Gold: The Best of Sting 1984–1994 (1994)

Singles from Ten Summoner's Tales
- 1. "It's Probably Me" Released: 23 June 1992; 2. "If I Ever Lose My Faith in You" Released: 1 February 1993; 3. "Seven Days" Released: 12 April 1993; 4. "Fields of Gold" Released: 7 June 1993; 5. "Shape of My Heart" Released: 23 August 1993; 6. "Love Is Stronger Than Justice (The Munificent Seven)" Released: 24 September 1993 (EU); 7. "Nothing 'Bout Me" Released: 20 December 1993

Ten Summoner's Tales is the fourth solo studio album by English musician Sting. Released in 1993, it explores themes of love and morality in a more upbeat mood compared to his previous release, the introspective The Soul Cages, released in 1991 and written about the death of his father. The album contains two US hits; "If I Ever Lose My Faith in You" reached No. 17 on the Billboard Hot 100 while "Fields of Gold" got to No. 23.

Ten Summoner's Tales was shortlisted for the 1993 Mercury Prize. In 1994, it was nominated for six Grammy awards including Album of the Year (losing to Whitney Houston‘s The Bodyguard), winning Best Engineered Album, Non-Classical, Best Male Pop Vocal Performance ("If I Ever Lose My Faith in You") and Best Long Form Music Video, while "If I Ever Lose My Faith in You" was also nominated for Record and Song of the Year.

== Background ==
Sting said that he intended for the songs on Ten Summoner's Tales to be more upbeat than the material found on his previous studio album, The Soul Cages, which released to the death of his father. Sting stated that his goal for Ten Summoner's Tales was to write songs that were less personal and would instead "amuse my band and family."

The cover of the album was photographed at Wardour Castle in Wiltshire, featuring Hrímnir, an Icelandic horse Sting owned for a period. He bought the horse from his friend Ársæll Jónsson. The title is a combined pun of his family name, Sumner, and the summoner in Geoffrey Chaucer's The Canterbury Tales.

== Recording ==
Ten Summoner's Tales was recorded at Lake House, Wiltshire, mixed at The Town House, London and mastered at Masterdisk, New York. Sting's core band on Ten Summoner's Tales consisted of Dominic Miller on guitar, David Sancious on keyboards, and Vinnie Colaiuta on drums. This was the same group of musicians that served as Sting's touring band in 1990. He was also augmented by a Paul Franklin on pedal steel guitar, Larry Adler on harmonica, a horn section, and a string quartet.

The recording process began in August 1992, with sessions often commencing at 11:30 a.m. and concluding at 11:00 p.m. After the first week of recording, Padgham listened back to the recordings and concluded that the bass parts were too loud. To address the issue, Bob Ludwig sent him some bass traps to place around the recording facility so that some of the lower frequencies could be absorbed. Following two months of recording, the album shifted over to The Town House for the mixing process, where additional overdubs took place over the course of two weeks. Two rough takes of "If I Ever Lose My Faith in You" were attempted during the first recording session, after which the band completed five takes. During the mixing process at The Town House, Sting redid his bass part. Some of Miller's guitar parts were punched in, as were a few of Sting's bass and vocals parts for the purpose of fixing intonation and pitch issues. Padgham attempted to keep most of the original performances from Lake House intact for the purpose of making the song easily replicable in a live setting. Sting's harmonica, an organ part triggered by a Synclavier were overdubbed on the track in addition to some percussion parts that were played by Sting and Colaiuta.

A 64-channel Solid State Logic console was used for the recording of Ten Summoner's Tales. Solid State Logic had designed a portable studio for Sting with a desk that could fold into 16 flight cases. Sting also used C800 G tube microphone developed by Sony, which Hugh Padgham, the co-producer of Ten Summoner's Tales, was "the only mike I have found that can get Sting's vocals sounding how I wanted them so sound."

The Solid State Logic console was placed in Sting's dining room at Lake House, with the musicians situated at the other side of the room. The room consisted of wooden floors covered with a rug and a semi-arched plaster ceiling that reached a maximum height of 18 feet. Padgham said that this room resulted in a "really great" sound with "nice dispersion". They encountered some difficulties with the loudness of the drums despite efforts to reduce the volume with a drum screen. Each musician was given an 8-channel stereo mixer so that they could control the levels of the monitor speakers placed around them.

== Composition ==
Sting wrote 14 songs prior to the recording process of Ten Summoner's Tales, several of which were demoed on a Synclavier before he presented them to the rest of his band. He opted to center the material on Ten Summoner's Tales around various characters rather than his own life, but later arrived at the conclusion that these songs had more parallels to his own life than he expected. He told Robert Hilburn of the Los Angeles Times that "When I started this one, I said, 'OK, I’m going to write songs about other people'. But having given myself that freedom and latitude, I ended by accident revealing more of myself than I had figured." He referred to Ten Summoner's Tales as "a pop record in the truest sense."

The album's opening song, "If I Ever Lose My Faith in You", was written by Sting after concluding that he could easily identify what he had lost faith in, but struggled to determine if the inverse was true. In the song, Sting deliberately kept the answer to the title tag ambiguous, elaborating in interviews that the song could relate to faith in a romantic partner, a supernatural deity, or himself.

Sting based "Shape of My Heart" on a card player whose goal is to understand the "mystical logic in luck" of the game rather than to win. He wanted this song to explore how the card player's tendency to conceal their emotions parlayed into their difficulties in expressing their love in a relationship. Sting felt that this character served as a metaphor for his own reservations about communicating his emotions. He also felt that the song related to his decreased desire to pursue perpetual relevance in the music industry, explaining that "staying in the public eye is a game", and that he preferred to maintain his craft "without necessarily having to kill myself to do it." "Fields of Gold" was inspired by the scenery of gold barley fields outside of his 16th century home, saying that he would "watch the wind moving over the shimmering surface, like waves on an ocean of gold." He said that "Fields of Gold" was about "feeling very joyous in the moment" and the "sadness" of recognizing that this joy is temporary.

Sting had an affinity for Augustine of Hippo due to his belief that he was more willing to acknowledge his imperfections, which led to the creation of "Saint on Augustine in Hell". The second track on the album, "Love Is Stronger Than Justice (The Munificent Seven)", was named as a homage to the films Seven Samurai and The Magnificent Seven. According to the interview disc, the idea came to Sting when he wanted to write a song in the 7/4 time signature. The song "Seven Days" was written in the 5/4 time signature, with Sting referring to it as "a strange single" about a person who is coerced into a romantic relationship by a rival.

== Release ==
Professional ratings
Initial reviews (in 1993)
Review scores
Source	Rating
The Buffalo News	4/5 stars
Calgary Herald	B+
Chicago Tribune	3/4 stars
Entertainment Weekly	A
Los Angeles Times	3/4 stars
Music Week	4/5 stars
Q	4/5 stars
Rolling Stone	4/5 stars
The Sacramento Bee	4/4 stars
Select	2/5 medals
USA Today	3/4 stars

Professional ratings
Retrospective reviews (after 1993)
Review scores
Source	Rating
AllMusic	4.5/5 stars
The Rolling Stone Album Guide	3/5 stars

Around the release of Ten Summoner's Tales, between 70,000 and 100,000 copies of Ten Summoner's Tales were stolen while a from a Polygram pressing plant in Hanover, Germany, was en route to a warehouse in Italy. Polydor Records took out advertisements in daily newspapers alerting prospective purchasers of the album of the theft.

A&M Records released Ten Summoner's Tales on LP, CD, cassette, DCC, and on video. The company also set the release date for Ten Summoner's Tales on 1 March 1993 in Europe, intentionally timing it one week ahead of its release in the United States. To promote the album in Europe, A&M Records purchased television slots on Eurosport along with rock music magazines. Other promotional efforts included television, radio, and print interviews, with Sting also appearing on Saturday Night Live in February. Sting also embarked on a world tour primarily consisting of stadium dates opening for The Grateful Dead.

"If I Ever Lose My Faith" was released as the album's first single in all territories. The single performed well Europe, where it unseated Whitney Houston's "I Will Always Love You" after spending nine weeks at the top of Music & Media's European Hit Radio chart. In the United States, "Fields of Gold" was released as the album's second single. Both of these singles reached the top 30 on the Billboard Hot 100.

A long-form performance video of the entire album was filmed at Sting's home studio. This film, which was directed by Doug Nichol and produced by Julie Fong, received a release on VHS and LaserDisc in conjunction with the release of Ten Summoner's Tales. In 1994, the video went on to win a Grammy Award for Best Long Form Video and was directed A promotional disc was made where Sting discusses some of the songs on the album.

On 11 August 1994, a compact disc of Ten Summoner's Tales became the first item securely purchased over the Internet, for $12.48 plus shipping.

=== Commercial performance ===
Unlike Sting's previous solo albums, Ten Summoner's Tales did not reach number one on the UK Albums Chart, being held off the top spot by Lenny Kravitz's Are You Gonna Go My Way upon its release. Ten Summoner's Tales remained in the top 20 for more than six months in the UK.

In the United States, Ten Summoner's Tales debuted at No. 2, which matched the peak positions of Sting's solo albums The Dream of the Blue Turtles and The Soul Cages. By September 1993, Ten Summoner's Tales' had achieved worldwide sales of 3 million by September 1993.

=== Remasters ===
Ten Summoner's Tales was remastered and re-released in 1998. The new CD issue included a bonus video track of "If I Ever Lose My Faith in You". It also featured the song "Everybody Laughed But You", which was exclusive to the European release of the album. Explaining the decision to include "Everybody Laughed But You" on European pressings, the international marketing director for A&M said that it was would counter the viability of import records and provide radio programmers with another song for airplay. The instrumental track for "Everybody Laughed But You" was also used with an alternate lyric and released as "January Stars" on the singles "Seven Days" and "If I Ever Lose My Faith in You".

In February 2023, Ten Summoner's Tales a digital-exclusive 30th anniversary deluxe edition was released, which included the original track listing and 15 bonus tracks.

== Critical reception ==
Writing for Music Week, Alan Jones called Ten Summoner's Tales a "typically diverse album of merit" that was "more easily accessible" than The Soul Cages. Billboard said that Ten Summoner's Tales attained an enviable new plateau" for Sting, adding that it "entertains and amuses as thoroughly as it rocks". Cashbox said that the material on Ten Summoner's Tales provided "yet another texture added to the complex tapestry woven by this musical master of poetic/pop storytelling." They felt that the album contained a contrast of "lighthearted trickery" and songs that brought "listeners in for a more impassioned journey".

Reviewing the album for the Los Angeles Times, Chris Willman described Ten Summoner's Tales as Sting's "least conceptually or musically ambitious" and "least personal" album up to that point, adding that this "in no way strikes against the album’s inherent pleasures, which are great". Greg Kot of the The Chicago Tribune felt that Ten Summoner's Tales was "light, lively and, most of all, fun" and called it an improvement over Sting's previous album, The Soul Cages. In his review for Rolling Stone, Anthony DeCurtis said that Ten Summoner's Tales seemed deliberately crafted to be "an intentional crowd pleaser". He highlighted Sting's "typically arresting voice" and the musicianship of his backing band, particularly noting the "forays of jazz complexity" and the presence of odd time signatures.

Andrew Collins was more critical of Ten Summoner's Tales in his review for Select magazine, saying parts of the album sounded "uncomfy, embarrassing and stiff". He described the album as "late-nite easy listening" and believed that some of Sting's lyrics compromised the lyrics, specifically citing the "overwrought metaphor" on "Heavy Cloud No Rain" and the "musty deck-of-cards symbolism on the otherwise pretty 'Shape of My Heart'".

== Track listing ==
All tracks are written by Sting, except where noted.

No.	Title	Writer(s)	Length
1.	"Prologue (If I Ever Lose My Faith in You)"		4:30
2.	"Love Is Stronger Than Justice (The Munificent Seven)"		5:12
3.	"Fields of Gold"		3:42
4.	"Heavy Cloud No Rain"		3:39
5.	"She's Too Good for Me"		2:30
6.	"Seven Days"		4:40
7.	"Saint Augustine in Hell"		5:05
8.	"It's Probably Me"	Sting; Eric Clapton; Michael Kamen	4:57
9.	"Everybody Laughed but You"		3:53
10.	"Shape of My Heart"	Sting; Dominic Miller	4:38
11.	"Something the Boy Said"		5:13
12.	"Epilogue (Nothing 'Bout Me)"		3:39
Total length:			52:31

Notes:

- "Everybody Laughed But You" does not appear on most vinyl pressings or on the original US and Canadian versions of the album.
- Pressings of the album that do not include "Everybody Laughed But You" (and so only have 11 tracks) omit "Prologue" from the title of "If I Ever Lose My Faith in You".

== Personnel ==
- Sting – lead vocals, bass, double bass, harmonica, saxophone, arrangements
- David Sancious – keyboards
- Dominic Miller – guitars
- Paul Franklin – pedal steel guitar
- Vinnie Colaiuta – drums
- Larry Adler – chromatic harmonica
- Brendan Power – chromatic harmonica
- Richard Edwards – trombone
- Mark Nightingale – trombone
- John Barclay – trumpet
- Guy Barker – trumpet
- Dave Heath – flute
- Kathryn Tickell – Northumbrian smallpipes, fiddle
- Sian Bell – cello
- James Boyd – viola
- Simon Fischer – violin
- Kathryn Greeley – violin
- David Foxxe – narration

=== Production ===
- Produced by Hugh Padgham and Sting
- Engineered and mixed by Hugh Padgham
- Assistant engineer – Andrew Bradfield, Pete Lewis, Simon Osborne
- Digital editing – Roger Lian
- Mastered by Bob Ludwig at Masterdisk (New York)
- Technical assistant – Danny Quatrochi
- Photography – Kevin Westenberg
- Package design – Richard Frankel and Norman Moore

== Accolades ==
=== Grammy Awards ===
Year	Nominee / work	Award	Result
1994	Ten Summoner's Tales	Album of the Year	Nominated
1994	Ten Summoner's Tales	Best Engineered Album, Non-Classical	Won
1994	Ten Summoner's Tales	Best Music Video, Long Form	Won
1994	"If I Ever Lose My Faith in You"	Best Pop Vocal Performance, Male	Won
1994	"If I Ever Lose My Faith in You"	Record of the Year	Nominated
1994	"If I Ever Lose My Faith in You"	Song of the Year	Nominated

=== Brit Awards ===
Year	Nominee / work	Award	Result
1994	Ten Summoner's Tales	Best British Album	Nominated
1994	Sting (performer)	Best British Male Artist	Won
1994	"Fields of Gold"	Best British Video	Nominated

=== Mercury Prize ===
Year	Nominee / work	Award	Result
1993	Ten Summoner's Tales	Mercury Music Prize	Nominated

== Charts ==
=== Weekly charts ===
Chart (1993)	Peak position
Australian Albums (ARIA)	9
Austrian Albums (Ö3 Austria)	1
Canadian Albums (RPM)	3
Dutch Albums (Album Top 100)	5
Finnish Albums (Suomen virallinen lista)	31
French Albums (SNEP)	2
German Albums (Offizielle Top 100)	2
Hungarian Albums (MAHASZ)	17
Japanese Albums (Oricon)	4
New Zealand Albums (RMNZ)	5
Norwegian Albums (VG-lista)	3
Scottish Albums (Official Charts)	4
Swedish Albums (Sverigetopplistan)	10
Swiss Albums (Schweizer Hitparade)	3
UK Albums (Official Charts)	2
US Billboard 200	2

=== Year-end charts ===
Chart (1993)	Position
Austrian Albums (Ö3 Austria)	25
Canadian Albums (RPM)	19
Dutch Albums (Album Top 100)	28
French Albums (SNEP)	18
German Albums (Offizielle Top 100)	14
Japanese Albums (Oricon)	101
New Zealand Albums (RMNZ)	23
Spanish Albums (AFYVE)	20
Swiss Albums (Schweizer Hitparade)	28
UK Albums (OCC)	12
US Billboard 200	21

== Certifications and sales ==
Region	Certification	Certified units/sales
Australia (ARIA)	Platinum	70,000^{^}
Canada (Music Canada)	Platinum	100,000^{^}
Finland (Musiikkituottajat)	Gold	28,537
France (SNEP)	2× Gold	200,000^{*}
Germany (BVMI)	Gold	250,000^{^}
Italy (FIMI)	Platinum	300,000
Japan (RIAJ)	Gold	178,870
Netherlands (NVPI)	Gold	50,000^{^}
Spain (Promusicae)	Platinum	100,000^{^}
Switzerland (IFPI Switzerland)	Platinum	50,000^{^}
United Kingdom (BPI)	2× Platinum	600,000^{^}
United States (RIAA)	3× Platinum	3,000,000^{^}
Summaries
Europe (IFPI)	Platinum	1,000,000^{*}
^{*} Sales figures based on certification alone.^{^} Shipments figures based on certification alone.
