= Who's That Man =

Single by Toby Keith

from the album Boomtown
- B-side: "You Ain't Much Fun"
- Released: July 18, 1994
- Genre: Country
- Length: 4:54 (Album Version); 3:32 (Radio Edit); 4:03 (Music Video)
- Label: PolyGram/Polydor Nashville 853358
- Songwriter: Toby Keith
- Producers: Nelson Larkin and Harold Shedd

Toby Keith singles chronology
"Wish I Didn't Know Now" (1994)	"Who's That Man" (1994)	"Upstairs Downtown" (1994)

"Who's That Man" is a song written and recorded by American country music singer Toby Keith. It was released in July 1994 as the first single from his 1994 album Boomtown. The song became Keith's second number one hit on the US Billboard Hot Country Singles & Tracks (now Hot Country Songs) chart.

The following year, "Who's That Man" got shortlisted for the Academy of Country Music awards for Single Record and Song of the Year, Keith himself was shortlisted for Top New Male Vocalist that year as well.

== Content ==
The narrator discusses returning to the home in which he used to reside. His ex-wife, children and their family dog still live in the residence, but the wife's new husband has now taken the place of the narrator.

The radio edit of the song (3:32) fades out shortly after the final refrain begins.

== Music video ==
The music video for this song was directed by Marc Ball, and premiered on CMT on July 21, 1994. It features Keith driving in an old neighborhood, and singing and playing guitar in a dark room. Throughout the video, a man, woman and children are seen playing outside.

The video uses a different edit of the song than the radio version. This edit (4:03) removes the instrumental bridge and final refrain, skipping from the second refrain directly to the outro of the album version.

== Chart performance ==
"Who's That Man" debuted at number 64 on the country chart dated July 30, 1994. It charted for 20 weeks on that chart, and became Keith's second Number One on the chart dated October 8, 1994, holding that position for one week.

=== Charts ===
Chart (1994)	Peak position
Canada Country Singles (RPM)	1
US Bubbling Under Hot 100 (Billboard)	2
US Hot Country Songs (Billboard)	1

=== Year-end charts ===
Chart (1994)	Position
Canada Country Tracks (RPM)	61
US Country Songs (Billboard)	34

== Certifications ==
Region	Certification	Certified units/sales
United States (RIAA)	Gold	500,000^{‡}
^{‡} Sales+streaming figures based on certification alone.

== Accolades ==
Year	Nominee / work	Award	Result
1995	"Who's That Man"	Academy of Country Music Award for Single Record of the Year	Shortlisted
1995	"Who's That Man"	Academy of Country Music Award for Song of the Year	Shortlisted
