= You Shouldn't Kiss Me Like This =

Single by Toby Keith

from the album How Do You Like Me Now?!
- Released: October 16, 2000
- Recorded: 1999
- Genre: Country
- Length: 3:42
- Label: DreamWorks Nashville
- Songwriter: Toby Keith
- Producers: James Stroud; Toby Keith

Toby Keith singles chronology
"Country Comes to Town" (2000)	"You Shouldn't Kiss Me Like This" (2000)	"I'm Just Talkin' About Tonight" (2001)

"You Shouldn't Kiss Me Like This" is a song written and recorded by American country music artist Toby Keith. It was released on October 16, 2000 as the fourth and final single from his 1999 album How Do You Like Me Now?!. The song reached number one on the US Billboard Hot Country Singles & Tracks (now Hot Country Songs) charts. It also peaked at number 32 on the Billboard Hot 100.

== Music video ==
The music video was directed by Michael Salomon, and premiered on CMT on October 19, 2000. It features a young man speaking with an older woman (Tané McClure) cleaning up the party. An obvious friendship is shown from her thankfulness for his aid. In the same respect, he kisses her on the cheek, uncertain of any other way to thank her for all she has done for his family. The unexpected kiss leads to a chain of events from dancing, to mutual sadness as the late night ends knowing he must leave for college the next morning, to his unexpected return which brings out passion between them. In stark contrast to the emotions of the lyrics, a surprise ending reveals that the entire video was a daydream. It is brought to an abrupt halt as she shoves a bag full of garbage in his arms to throw away as he leaves and gives him a tactless tug and pat on his cheek wishing him luck.

== Chart performance ==
"You Shouldn't Kiss Me Like This" debuted at number 62 on the U.S. Billboard Hot Country Singles & Tracks for the week of October 28, 2000.

=== Weekly charts ===
Chart (2000–2001)	Peak position
US Hot Country Songs (Billboard)	1
US Billboard Hot 100	32

=== Year-end charts ===
Chart (2001)	Position
US Country Songs (Billboard)	4
US Billboard Hot 100	91

== Certifications ==
Region	Certification	Certified units/sales
United States (RIAA)	Gold	500,000^{‡}
^{‡} Sales+streaming figures based on certification alone.
