= Dream Walkin' (song) =

Single by Toby Keith

from the album Dream Walkin'
- B-side: "Strangers Again"
- Released: January 26, 1998
- Recorded: 1997
- Genre: Country
- Length: 3:56
- Label: Mercury Nashville 574950
- Songwriters: Toby Keith; Chuck Cannon
- Producers: James Stroud; Toby Keith

Toby Keith singles chronology
"I'm So Happy I Can't Stop Crying" (1997)	"Dream Walkin'" (1998)	"Double Wide Paradise" (1998)

"Dream Walkin'" is a song co-written and performed by American country music artist Toby Keith. It was released in January 1998 as the third single from his album of the same name. It peaked at number 5 in the United States, and number 3 in Canada. Keith wrote the song with Chuck Cannon.

== Content ==
The song is about a man who repeatedly dreams about a former lover who haunts his memory: "just like smoke through a keyhole/she slips in so silently/mmm, she's walkin' around in my dreams."

== Critical reception ==
Deborah Evans Price, of Billboard magazine reviewed the song favorably, saying that it "boasts a strong melody boasted by tasty guitar licks." She goes on to call the lyrics "very visual" and say that Keith "delivers a winning performance with his full-throated country baritone exploring every lyrical nuance."

== Music video ==
The music video was directed by Michael Salomon, and premiered on CMT on January 30, 1998, when CMT named it a "Hot Shot". It features Keith in a dreamlike fantasy world where his lover appears and disappears.

== Chart positions ==
"Dream Walkin'" debuted at number 75 on the Hot Country Singles & Tracks chart for the week of January 31, 1998.

Chart (1998)	Peak position
Canada Country Singles (RPM)	3
US Hot Country Songs (Billboard)	5

=== Year-end charts ===
Chart (1998)	Position
Canada Country Tracks (RPM)	59
US Country Songs (Billboard)	46
