= Big Ol' Truck =

Single by Toby Keith

from the album Boomtown
- B-side: "In Other Words"
- Released: July 10, 1995
- Recorded: 1994
- Genre: Country
- Length: 3:42
- Label: PolyGram/Polydor Nashville 579974
- Songwriter: Toby Keith
- Producers: Nelson Larkin; Harold Shedd

Toby Keith singles chronology
"You Ain't Much Fun" (1995)	"Big Ol' Truck" (1995)	"Does That Blue Moon Ever Shine on You" (1996)

"Big Ol' Truck" is a song written and recorded by American country music artist Toby Keith. It was released in July 1995 as the fourth and final single from his 1994 album Boomtown. The song peaked at number 15 on the US Billboard Hot Country Singles & Tracks (Hot Country Songs) chart, making it the first single of his career to miss the Top 10. The song was a Top 10 in Canada, having reached number 10 on the RPM Country Tracks chart.

== Content ==
The narrator is in love with a girl who drives a "big ol' truck."

== Music video ==
The song's music video premiered on CMT on July 12, 1995, during The CMT Delivery Room, and was directed by Marc Ball. The video shows Keith performing with his band at an outside party accompanied by a crowd. The scenes are also intercut with Keith trying to get the girl in the pickup truck.

== Chart positions ==
"Big Ol' Truck" debuted at number 75 on the Hot Country Singles & Tracks chart for the week of July 15, 1995.

Chart (1995)	Peak position
Canada Country Singles (RPM)	10
US Hot Country Songs (Billboard)	15
