= We Were in Love =

Single by Toby Keith

from the album Dream Walkin'
- B-side: "Double Wide Paradise"
- Released: June 9, 1997
- Recorded: 1997
- Genre: Country
- Length: 4:20
- Label: Mercury Nashville 574636
- Songwriters: Chuck Cannon; Allen Shamblin
- Producers: James Stroud; Toby Keith

Toby Keith singles chronology
"Me Too" (1996)	"We Were in Love" (1997)	"I'm So Happy I Can't Stop Crying" (1997)

"We Were in Love" is a song written by Chuck Cannon and Allen Shamblin, and performed by American country music artist Toby Keith. It was released in June 1997 as the first single from his album Dream Walkin'. It peaked at number 2 in both the United States and Canada. The song was originally intended for Faith Hill, who placed it on hold for a short period while recording her 1998 album Faith, as reported by Keith on After MidNite with Blair Garner.

== Content ==
The narrator wishes that he could build a time machine, and go back to when he and his lover were 17, and when they were in love.

== Music video ==
This was the first Toby Keith video that Michael Salomon directed, who has since directed the majority of his music videos. It premiered on CMT on June 13, 1997, when CMT named it a "Hot Shot".

== Chart positions ==
"We Were in Love" debuted at number 61 on the Hot Country Singles & Tracks chart for the week of June 14, 1997.

Chart (1997)	Peak position
Canada Country Singles (RPM)	2
US Bubbling Under Hot 100 Singles (Billboard)	16
US Hot Country Songs (Billboard)	2

=== Year-end charts ===
Chart (1997)	Position
Canada Country Tracks (RPM)	51
US Country Songs (Billboard)	24
