= Drum screen =

Acoustic panel or system of panels

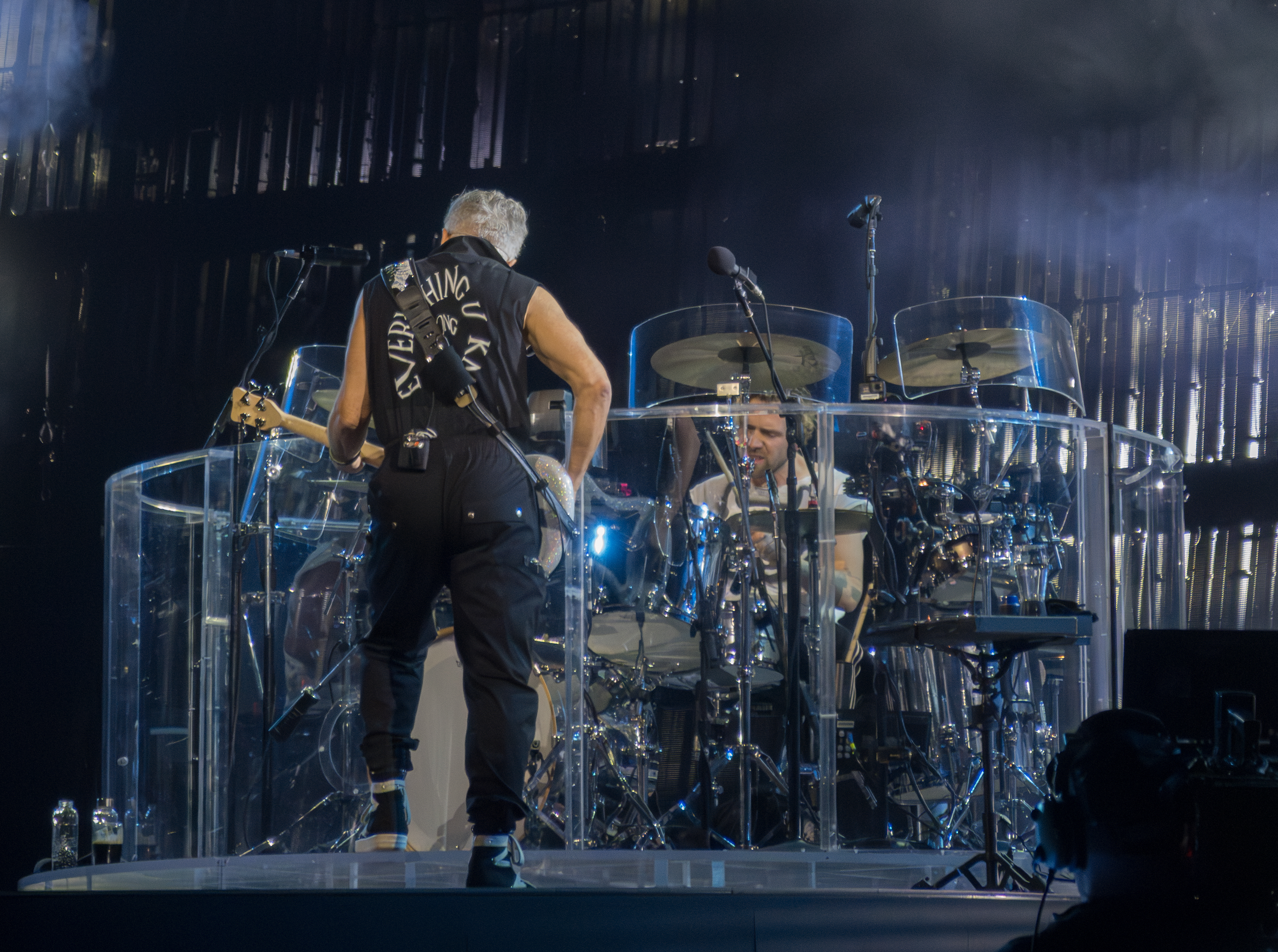
A comprehensive drum screen was added to U2's performance at The Sphere.

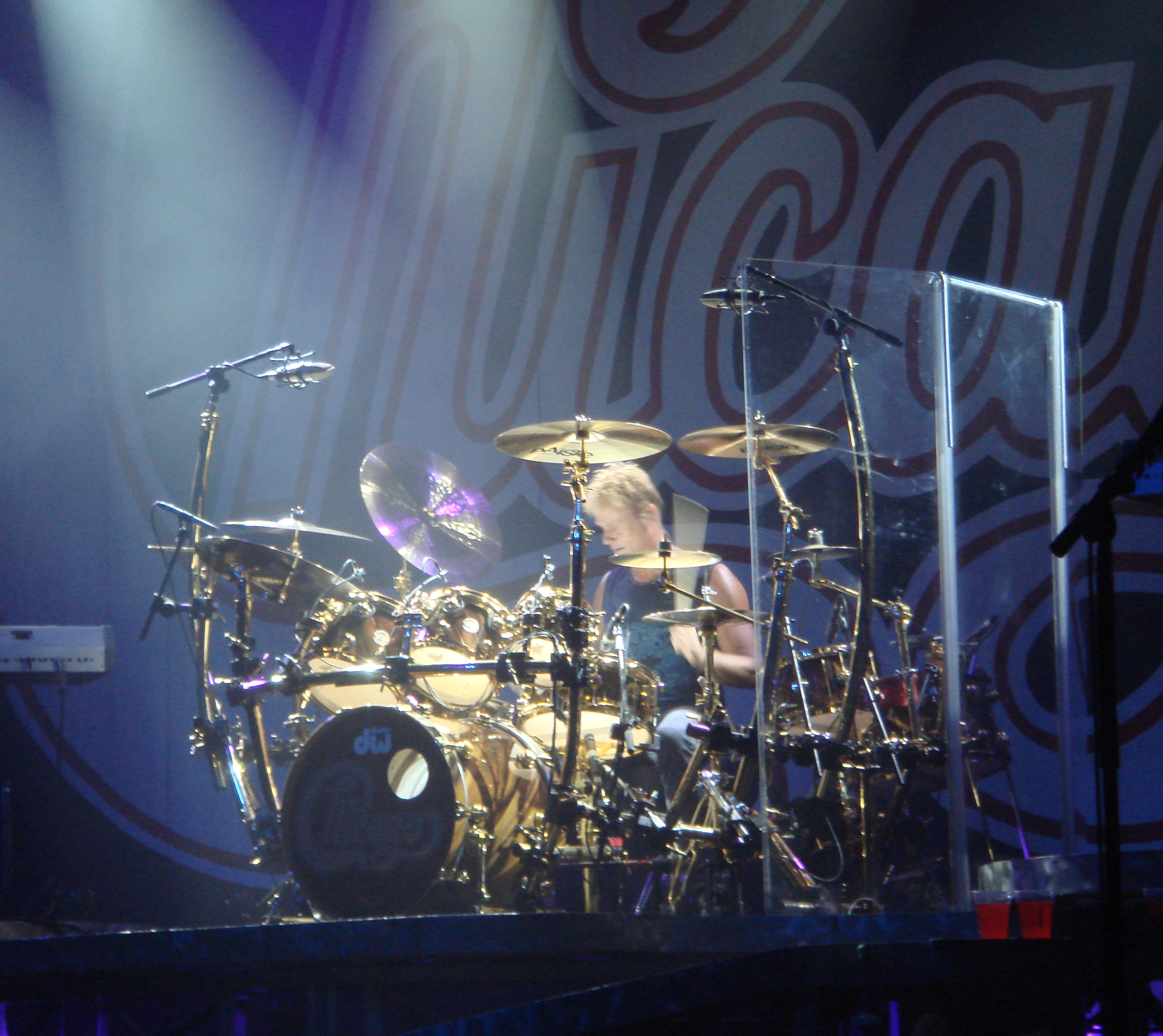
Tris Imboden using a simple drum screen

A drum screen, sometimes referred to as a drum shield or acoustic shield, is a tool used by audio engineers to avoid the sound control problems caused when louder instruments overwhelm quieter instruments and vocals on stage. It is a transparent acoustic panel or system of panels that are used around drums, percussion instruments, and other loud musical instruments to acoustically separate louder instruments from other musical instruments and vocalists who may be close by.

== Composition ==
Drum screens are usually made out of a 0.22-inch (5.6mm) thick clear acrylic sheet material. A more expensive scratch-resistant or AR (abrasion-resistant) acrylic is also sometimes used for rugged use and touring applications. While plastic drum screens perform fairly well as sound barriers, they reflect most sound that strikes them and so very little sound is actually absorbed. Therefore, it is usually recommended that some type of acoustic absorption product, such as acoustic foam, heavy curtains, acoustic panels, or absorption baffles be used on a significant percentage of the screen surface and opposite the screen in order to soak up and dissipate as much of the direct and reflected sound energy as possible.

== Variations ==
In some applications where the performance area has high ceilings that reflect a large percentage of the sound, acrylic sheet is sometimes used to almost completely surround the loud instrument on all sides and above to create what is commonly known as an isolation booth. While this technique will aid in isolating the loud sound source, the interior acoustics of any booth with such a large percentage of highly reflective surfaces will be difficult or impossible to control. It is therefore recommended that at least 60% or more of the reflective surfaces inside this type of isolation booth be treated with acoustic absorption products. It is also wise to use additional carpet padding and carpet under the entire setup to reduce reflections off the floor and absorb additional sound energy.

== See also ==
- Recording Studio § Isolation booth
