= He Ain't Worth Missing =

Single by Toby Keith

from the album Toby Keith
- B-side: "A Little Less Talk and a Lot More Action"
- Released: June 28, 1993
- Genre: Country
- Length: 3:05
- Label: PolyGram/Mercury 862262
- Songwriter: Toby Keith
- Producers: Nelson Larkin; Harold Shedd

Toby Keith singles chronology
"Should've Been a Cowboy" (1993)	"He Ain't Worth Missing" (1993)	"A Little Less Talk and a Lot More Action" (1993)

"He Ain't Worth Missing" is a song written and recorded by American country music singer Toby Keith. It was released in June 1993 as the second single from his self-titled debut album. The song peaked at number 5 on the U.S. Billboard Hot Country Songs chart and at number 11 on the Canadian RPM country tracks. It also peaked at number 7 on the Billboard Bubbling Under Hot 100.

== Content ==
The song is a mid-tempo in which the narrator sympathizes with a woman whose boyfriend has left her. He tells her that "he ain't worth missing" and tries to start a romance with her.

== Music video ==
The music video for the song begins with a man playing the piano at a bar. Scenes also feature Keith singing the song in his bedroom, and himself at a bar with a woman, who is feeling bad for her, as the man gets up and leaves the bar.

== Critical reception ==
Deborah Evans Price, of Billboard magazine reviewed the song unfavorably saying "lyrical and musical cliches are surrounded by tired, soft-rock synth patches on Keith's flimsy sophomore effort." She also said that Keith is looking for hooks "in all the wrong places" and that the "overdubbed pedal steel guitar is the only trace of country in this midtempo lament."

== Chart performance ==
"He Ain't Worth Missing" debuted at number 71 Hot Country Singles & Tracks chart dated July 3, 1993. It charted for 20 weeks on that chart, and peaked at number 5 on the country chart dated October 23, 1993.

Chart (1993)	Peak position
Canada Country Singles (RPM)	11
US Bubbling Under Hot 100 (Billboard)	7
US Hot Country Songs (Billboard)	5

=== Year-end charts ===
Chart (1993)	Position
US Country Songs (Billboard)	35
