= I'm So Happy I Can't Stop Crying =

1996 single by Sting

Single by Sting

from the album Mercury Falling
- Released: 18 November 1996
- Genre: Rock, country rock
- Length: 4:00
- Label: A&M
- Songwriter: Sting
- Producers: Hugh Padgham, Sting

Sting singles chronology
"I Was Brought to My Senses" (1996)	"I'm So Happy I Can't Stop Crying" (1996)	"On Silent Wings" (1997)

Music video
- "Sting - I'm So Happy I Can't Stop Crying" on YouTube

"I'm So Happy I Can't Stop Crying" is a song written and recorded by the English rock singer Sting, which featured on his fifth album, Mercury Falling (1996). The song was also released as a single in November 1996, by A&M Records, and reached No. 94 in the US. Sting also recorded the song as a duet with American country music artist Toby Keith for Keith's 1997 album Dream Walkin'; this version reached No. 2 in the US Hot Country Songs charts, giving Sting his only country hit single, and No. 84 in the US Billboard Hot 100 charts.

== Background and release ==
Sting began composing the song as a rock song, but the lyrical content pushed the song in a country direction, and it evolved into a country-rock shuffle. The song begins in the key of E-flat major, before modulating a semitone upward to E major in the final verse. Its lyrics concern a father whose wife has left him for another man and taken their two children. After a cynical beginning, he has a revelation about the connectedness of life and the universe, and finishes the song truly 'so happy he can't stop crying'. The music video for the song was directed by Lol Creme.

During the Mercury Falling tour, Sting would often invite audience members up onto stage to sing the song along with him.

== Critical reception ==
Larry Flick from Billboard magazine described the song as "a country-flavored ballad that shows the artist at his most tender and engaging." He added, "It's kind of odd at first to hear Sting's reedy tenor amid the twang of a slide guitar, but it ultimately works."

== Track listing ==
- US edition
1. "I'm So Happy I Can't Stop Crying"
2. "This Was Never Meant to Be"
3. "Giacomo's Blues"
4. "Beneath a Desert Moon"
- German edition
1. "I'm So Happy I Can't Stop Crying"
2. "Giacomo's Blues"
3. "Moonlight"
4. "La Belle Dame Sans Regrets"

== Charts ==
Chart performance for Sting recording
Chart (1996)	Peak position
Australia (ARIA)	133
Canada Top Singles (RPM)	27
Canada Adult Contemporary (RPM)	16
Germany (GfK)	74
Scottish Singles Sales (Official Charts)	47
UK Singles (Official Charts)	54
US Billboard Hot 100	94
US Adult Pop Airplay (Billboard)	28

== Toby Keith version ==
"I'm So Happy I Can't Stop Crying"

Single by Toby Keith and Sting

from the album Dream Walkin'
- B-side: "Jacky Don Tucker (Play by the Rules Miss All the Fun)"
- Released: 6 October 1997
- Genre: Country, country rock
- Length: 4:03
- Label: Mercury Nashville 568114
- Songwriter: Sting
- Producers: James Stroud; Toby Keith

Toby Keith singles chronology
"We Were in Love" (1997)	"I'm So Happy I Can't Stop Crying" (1997)	"Dream Walkin'" (1998)

Sting singles chronology
"On Silent Wings" (1997)	"I'm So Happy I Can't Stop Crying" (1997)	"Roxanne '97" (1997)

In 1997, American country music singer Toby Keith recorded the song for his fourth studio album, Dream Walkin' (1997). His version, a duet with Sting, was released in late 1997 as the album's second single. It charted higher than the original version on the Billboard Hot 100, peaking at No. 84. It reached No. 2 on the Hot Country Singles & Tracks (now Hot Country Songs) chart during the week ending January 17, 1998, right behind "Just to See You Smile" by Tim McGraw, becoming Sting's only entry on that chart. Additionally, it was nominated for a Grammy Award for Best Country Collaboration With Vocals.

=== Background ===
According to Keith, Sting agreed to let Keith record the song to give it a second chance at radio, as long as Sting could play bass guitar and sing duet vocals on it. The two also performed the song at the 1997 Country Music Association awards. In 2001, Keith told Country Music that he regretted making the record, describing it as a compromise:

"He was on the same label on the pop side," Keith recalls. "Everybody was talkin' about that tune, how great it was and how country it sounded. So they brought it over and said, 'Do this and we'll get Sting to come and sing on it, too.' The personalities conflicted. He's a real introvert. I was a real outgoing guy. He didn't like my abrasive and brash manner. It wasn't fun at all. It was a horrible experience."

=== Critical reception ===
Deborah Evans Price, of Billboard magazine reviewed the song favorably, saying that Sting and Keith's voices "complement each other extremely well." She goes on to say that a great songwriter can write words and music that transcend any genre and Sting's "poignant lyrics and strong melody on this song are perfect evidence."

=== Charts ===
"I'm So Happy I Can't Stop Crying" debuted at number 53 on the Hot Country Singles & Tracks chart for the week of 11 October 1997.

Weekly chart performance for duet re-recording
Chart (1997–1998)	Peak position
Canada Country Singles (RPM)	4
US Billboard Hot 100	84
US Hot Country Songs (Billboard)	2

Annual chart performance for duet re-recording
Chart (1998)	Position
US Country Songs (Billboard)	74
