= Nothing 'Bout Me =

1993 single by Sting

Single by Sting

from the album Ten Summoner's Tales
- Released: 20 December 1993
- Length: 3:39
- Label: A&M
- Songwriter: Sting
- Producers: Sting; Hugh Padgham

Sting singles chronology
"Love Is Stronger Than Justice (The Munificent Seven)" (1993)	"Nothing 'Bout Me" (1993)	"When We Dance" (1994)

"Nothing 'Bout Me" is a song by English singer-songwriter Sting as the final single from his fourth studio album, Ten Summoner's Tales (1993). In the US and Japan, the single was released in late 1993, but in the rest of the world, it was released in February 1994 by A&M Records. The song peaked at numbers 57 and 43 on the US Billboard Hot 100 and Cash Box Top 100 and also reached the top 50 in the United Kingdom, Canada, Iceland, and the Netherlands.

== Background ==
Sting commented that the song was "a tongue-in-cheek reaction to all the amateur psychology I'm subjected to whenever I put an album out. Listeners figure they can work you out through the songs. And they probably can. I'm not sure it suits my purpose to be so transparent though, so this is my attempt at diverting that. It's supposed to be a funny song."

The song features an AABA song structure with ascending chords at the end of the verses and the coda. A walking bass line is also present throughout. The melody uses 1, 3, 5, 7, 9, and 13 tones within the key of E-flat, creating a hexatonic scale, although according to Christopher Rait's 2019 doctoral dissertation on Sting's music for Canada's York University, it can be "more readily heard as a tertiary stack". Commenting on the song's ending, Sting said that "it's a chromatic runoff into eternity. It doesn't end. It keeps going."

== Critical reception and analysis ==
Most publications that mentioned "Nothing 'Bout Me" in reviews for Ten Summoners Tales discussed the song's lyrical content. The Baltimore Sun identified "Nothing 'Bout Me" as a song where the "singer laughs at those armchair psychiatrists who presume that by reading all his interviews and sifting through his lyric sheets that they have some understanding of who he really is". Pan-European magazine Music & Media said, "Mr. Sumner tries something new; "robust cocktail jazz." The drummer hits a kick-ass beat and a full blast horn section blows Sting, escorted by female backup singers, off his white horse." Rolling Stone wrote that the song "chides his critics for trying to freeze him in their notions about his life".

The San Antonio Express described the lyrics to "Nothing 'Bout Me" as "pointed", but thought that the song itself was "more lighthearted than it sounds". Victor Garbarini of The Baltimore Sun thought that "the funniest thing about 'Nothing About Me' is that that it sits at the end of the most revealing album of Sting's career." The Daily Telegraph was more critical of the song's merits, saying that "the pub rock of 'Nothing 'Bout Me' sounds like an out-take [sic] from fellow Geordie Jimmy Nail".

== Track listings ==
- 7-inch and cassette single
1. "Nothing 'Bout Me" (remix)
2. "If I Ever Lose My Faith in You" (Miracle of Science edit)
- 12-inch and CD single
1. "Nothing 'Bout Me" (remix)
2. "If I Ever Lose My Faith in You" (Miracle of Science edit)
3. "If I Ever Lose My Faith in You" (Hoax mix)
4. "Demolition Man" (Soulpower 12")

== Charts ==
Chart (1993–1994)	Peak position
Canada Top Singles (RPM)	10
Canada Adult Contemporary (RPM)	12
Europe (European Hit Radio)	31
Iceland (Íslenski Listinn Topp 40)	8
Netherlands (Single Top 100)	41
UK Singles (Official Charts)	32
UK Airplay (Music Week)	3
US Billboard Hot 100	57
US Adult Contemporary (Billboard)	17
US Pop Airplay (Billboard)	33
US Cash Box Top 100	43

== Release history ==
Region	Date	Format(s)	Label(s)	Ref.
Japan	20 December 1993	Mini-CD	A&M	
United Kingdom	14 February 1994	7-inch vinyl; 12-inch vinyl; CD; cassette	A&M	
