= Maverick (Hank Williams Jr. album) =

Studio album by Hank Williams Jr.
- Released: February 18, 1992
- Recorded: 1991
- Studio: Emerald Sound Studios, The Soundshop, Nashville, TN
- Length: 32:34
- Label: Curb/Capricorn
- Producer: Barry Beckett; James Stroud; Hank Williams Jr.

Hank Williams Jr. chronology
Pure Hank (1991)	Maverick (1992)	Out of Left Field (1993)

Professional ratings
Review scores
Source	Rating
Allmusic	3/5 stars

Maverick is the forty-fourth studio album by American musician Hank Williams Jr. It was released by Curb/Capricorn Records on February 18, 1992. "Hotel Whiskey," "Come On Over to the Country" and "Lyin' Jukebox" were released as singles. The album peaked at number 7 on the Billboard Top Country Albums chart and has been certified Gold by the RIAA.

== Track listing ==
1. "Come On Over to the Country" (Hank Williams Jr.) – 3:03
2. "Lyin' Jukebox" (Randy Archer, Bobby P. Barker) – 2:27
3. "Wild Weekend" (Peter Newland) – 3:47
4. "The Count Song" (Williams Jr.) – 4:05
5. "I Know What You've Got Up Your Sleeve" (Jerry Cupit, Tony Stampley, Kevin Stewart) – 2:38
6. "Hotel Whiskey" (Williams Jr.) – 3:47
  - duet with Clint Black
7. "Fax Me a Beer" (Williams Jr.) – 2:47
8. "Low Down Blues" (Williams) – 2:18
9. "A Little Less Talk and a Lot More Action" (Keith Hinton, Jimmy Alan Stewart) – 3:20
10. "Cut Bank, Montana" (Max D. Barnes, Skip Ewing) – 4:41

== Personnel ==
- Eddie Bayers - drums
- Barry Beckett - keyboards
- Clint Black - background vocals
- Mark Casstevens - banjo
- Dan Dugmore - steel guitar
- Chris Eddy - background vocals
- Steve Gibson - mandolin
- Mike Haynes - trumpet
- Jim Horn - baritone saxophone
- Dann Huff - electric guitar
- Mike Lawler - keyboards
- "Cowboy" Eddie Long - steel guitar
- Terry McMillan - harmonica
- Carl Marsh - Fairlight, programming
- Don Potter - acoustic guitar
- Suzi Ragsdale - background vocals
- Michael Rhodes - bass guitar
- Matt Rollings - keyboards
- Charles Rose - trombone
- Gove Scrivenor - autoharp
- Troy Seals - background vocals
- Lisa Silver - background vocals
- Denis Solee - tenor saxophone
- Jo-El Sonnier - accordion
- Joe Spivey - fiddle
- Harry Stinson - background vocals
- Hank Williams Jr. - lead vocals
- Reggie Young - electric guitar

== Chart performance ==
Chart (1992)	Peak position
U.S. Billboard Top Country Albums	7
U.S. Billboard 200	55
Canadian RPM Country Albums	22

== Certifications ==
Region	Certification	Certified units/sales
United States (RIAA)	Gold	500,000^{^}
^{^} Shipments figures based on certification alone.
