= A Little Less Talk and a Lot More Action =

"A Little Less Talk And A Lot More Action"

Single by Toby Keith

from the album Toby Keith
- B-side: "Mama Come Quick"
- Released: November 1, 1993
- Length: 2:49
- Label: PolyGram/Mercury 862844
- Songwriters: Keith Hinton, Jimmy Alan Stewart
- Producers: Nelson Larkin, Harold Shedd

Toby Keith singles chronology
"He Ain't Worth Missing" (1993)	"A Little Less Talk And A Lot More Action" (1993)	"Wish I Didn't Know Now" (1994)

"A Little Less Talk And A Lot More Action" is a song written by Keith Hinton and Jimmy Alan Stewart. Originally recorded by American country music singer Hank Williams Jr. on his 1992 album Maverick, the song was also recorded by Toby Keith one year later on his self-titled debut album. Keith's version was released in November 1993 as that album's third single. Also, it reached number 2 on the U.S. Billboard Hot Country Singles & Tracks (now Hot Country Songs) chart and peaked at number 25 on the Canadian RPM charts.

== Music video ==
The music video for this song features Keith performing this song in concert, at a bar, with a band. It was directed by Michael Merriman. The video was shot at a bar called Chastain's in Oklahoma City Oklahoma and features the original members of Toby Keith's Easy Money Band.

== Chart performance ==
"A Little Less Talk And A Lot More Action" debuted at number 66 on the country chart dated November 13, 1993. It charted for twenty weeks on that chart, and peaked at number 2 on the country chart dated February 19, 1994, behind John Michael Montgomery's "I Swear".

Chart (1993–1994)	Peak position
Canada Country Singles (RPM)	25
US Hot Country Songs (Billboard)	2

=== Year-end charts ===
Chart (1994)	Position
US Country Songs (Billboard)	38

== Certifications ==
Region	Certification	Certified units/sales
United States (RIAA)	Gold	500,000^{‡}
^{‡} Sales+streaming figures based on certification alone.
