= Wish I Didn't Know Now =

Single by Toby Keith

from the album Toby Keith
- B-side: "Under the Fall"
- Released: February 28, 1994
- Genre: Country
- Length: 3:26
- Label: PolyGram/Mercury 858290
- Songwriter: Toby Keith
- Producers: Nelson Larkin and Harold Shedd

Toby Keith singles chronology
| "A Little Less Talk and a Lot More Action" (1993) | "Wish I Didn't Know Now" (1994) | "Who's That Man" (1994) |

"Wish I Didn't Know Now" is a song written and recorded by American country music singer Toby Keith. It was released in February 1994 as the fourth and final single from his self-titled debut album. The song peaked at number 2 on the U.S. Billboard Hot Country Songs chart, and at number 17 on the Canadian RPM Country Tracks chart.

== Content ==
In the song, the narrator talks about how he suspected his lover was cheating and now that he found out his suspicions were right. The narrator wishes that he could go back to that period of blissful ignorance of being unaware of her affair just so they would still be together. The title lyric originates from the Bob Seger & the Silver Bullet Band song "Against the Wind".

== Music video ==
The music video was directed by Marc Ball, and was filmed in black and white. It features Keith singing the song in a dark house, while raining outside. Scenes also feature him, socializing with a girlfriend, and at times, other couples, and bar patrons. It premiered on CMT on March 2, 1994, where they named it a "Hot Shot" video of the week.

== Chart performance ==
"Wish I Didn't Know Now" debuted at number 54 on the US Billboard Hot Country Singles & Tracks chart dated March 19, 1994. It charted for 20 weeks on that chart, and peaked at number 2 for the week of May 28, 1994, behind Tim McGraw's "Don't Take the Girl".

=== Charts ===
| Chart (1994) | Peak position |
|---|---|
| Canada Country Singles (RPM) | 17 |
| US Hot Country Songs (Billboard) | 2 |

=== Year-end charts ===
| Chart (1994) | Position |
|---|---|
| US Country Songs (Billboard) | 26 |

== Cover versions ==
Ella Langley covered the song for Apple Music sessions on July 1, 2025. Her cover saw acclaim from fans of the original

== Certifications ==
| Region | Certification | Certified units/sales |
|---|---|---|
| United States (RIAA) | Gold | 500,000^{‡} |
^{‡} Sales+streaming figures based on certification alone.
