= How Do You Like Me Now?! =

Studio album by Toby Keith
- Released: November 2, 1999
- Genre: Country
- Length: 40:59
- Label: DreamWorks
- Producer: James Stroud; Toby Keith

Toby Keith chronology
Greatest Hits Volume One (1998)	How Do You Like Me Now?! (1999)	Pull My Chain (2001)

Singles from How Do You Like Me Now
- 1. "When Love Fades" Released: 1999; 2. "How Do You Like Me Now?!" Released: November 22, 1999; 3. "Country Comes to Town" Released: May 15, 2000; 4. "You Shouldn't Kiss Me Like This" Released: October 16, 2000

Professional ratings
Review scores
Source	Rating
Allmusic	4/5 stars

How Do You Like Me Now?! is the sixth studio album by American country music artist Toby Keith. It was released on November 2, 1999, by DreamWorks Records and was his first album with the label after Keith departed from Mercury Records in 1998. The album produced four singles, "When Love Fades", the title track, "Country Comes to Town", and "You Shouldn't Kiss Me Like This."

The album was produced by James Stroud, who was the head of DreamWorks Records.

== Track listing ==
No.	Title	Writer(s)	Length
1.	"How Do You Like Me Now?!"	Toby Keith; Chuck Cannon	3:27
2.	"When Love Fades"	Keith; Cannon	3:04
3.	"Blue Bedroom"	Keith; Cannon	3:28
4.	"New Orleans"	Mark D. Sanders; Bob DiPiero; Steve Seskin	4:11
5.	"Country Comes to Town"	Keith	3:38
6.	"Heart to Heart (Stelen's Song)"	Keith	3:33
7.	"She Only Gets That Way with Me"	Keith; Scotty Emerick	2:29
8.	"Die with Your Boots On"	Keith; Jim Femino	3:05
9.	"You Shouldn't Kiss Me Like This"	Keith	3:43
10.	"Hold You, Kiss You, Love You"	Byron Hill; Jack Jones; Frank Mickey Jones Jr.	3:13
11.	"Do I Know You (Bottom of My Heart)"	Keith	3:35
12.	"I Know a Wall When I See One"	J. B. Rudd; Jerry Salley	3:13

== Personnel ==
- Mike Brignardello - bass guitar
- Larry Byrom - acoustic guitar
- Mark Casstevens - acoustic guitar
- Dan Dugmore - steel guitar
- Paul Franklin - steel guitar
- Sonny Garrish - steel guitar
- Owen Hale - drums
- Aubrey Haynie - mandolin
- Clayton Ivey - piano, keyboards, organ
- Toby Keith - lead vocals
- Paul Leim - drum programming on "New Orleans"
- B. James Lowry - acoustic guitar
- Terry McMillan - harmonica
- Jerry McPherson - electric guitar
- Brent Mason - electric guitar
- Steve Nathan - keyboards, organ
- Brent Rowan - electric guitar
- John Wesley Ryles - background vocals
- Gary Smith - piano, keyboards, organ
- Glenn Worf - bass guitar
- Curtis Young - background vocals

== Chart performance ==
=== Weekly charts ===
Chart (1999–2001)	Peak position
Canadian Country Albums (RPM)	8
US Billboard 200	56
US Top Country Albums (Billboard)	9

=== Year-end charts ===
Chart (2000)	Position
US Billboard 200	170
US Top Country Albums (Billboard)	18

Chart (2001)	Position
Canadian Country Albums (Nielsen SoundScan)	27
US Billboard 200	131
US Top Country Albums (Billboard)	12

== Certifications ==
Region	Certification	Certified units/sales
United States (RIAA)	Platinum	1,000,000^{^}
^{^} Shipments figures based on certification alone.
