= You Ain't Much Fun =

Single by Toby Keith

from the album Boomtown
- B-side: "Life Was a Play"
- Released: March 14, 1995
- Recorded: 1994
- Genre: Country
- Length: 2:26
- Label: PolyGram/Polydor Nashville 851728
- Songwriters: Toby Keith; Carl Goff Jr.
- Producers: Nelson Larkin; Harold Shedd

Toby Keith singles chronology
"Upstairs Downtown" (1994)	"You Ain't Much Fun" (1995)	"Big Ol' Truck" (1995)

"You Ain't Much Fun" is a song co-written and recorded by American country music artist Toby Keith. It was released in March 1995 as the third single from his 1994 album Boomtown. The song peaked at number 2 on the US Billboard Hot Country Singles & Tracks (now Hot Country Songs) chart and at number 3 on the Canadian RPM country tracks. Keith wrote this song with Carl Goff Jr. It was also Keith's first single not to have an accompanying music video.

== Background and writing ==
Keith told The Boot that his co-writer, Carl Goff Junior, "came on the bus, and I was writing one night, and he was telling me some story about his wife. He said, 'Me and my wife have been in a fight, and she said she was going to leave me if I didn't slow down, so I quit drinking. I'm not drinking right now. So now I've been having to mow and have been out working in the yard, and I've had to get that car running.' He was telling me all his agony. She came home one night, and he had hit himself with a wrench or something and hurt his hand, and she said, 'What's the matter?' He told her, 'You ain't much fun since I quit drinkin'.' I was writing songs, and I said, 'Let's write this right now.' And we just sat down and wrote it."

== Content ==
The song is about a man who has sobered up and now has to do chores, such as mowing the grass, painting the house, sacking the trash, feeding the dog, mending the fence, and fixing the sink.

== Critical reception ==
Deborah Evans Price, of Billboard magazine reviewed the song favorably, saying that there is "just a touch of Roger Miller in this shuffle-beat lament of a man lonesome for the shelter of the bottle."

== Chart positions ==
"You Ain't Much Fun" debuted at number 63 on the Hot Country Singles & Tracks chart for the week of March 25, 1995.

Chart (1995)	Peak position
Canada Country Singles (RPM)	3
US Hot Country Songs (Billboard)	2

=== Year-end charts ===
Chart (1995)	Position
Canada Country Tracks (RPM)	42
US Country Songs (Billboard)	11
