= Should've Been a Cowboy =

Single by Toby Keith

from the album Toby Keith
- B-side: "Some Kinda Good Kinda Hold on Me"
- Released: February 12, 1993
- Recorded: 1992
- Genre: Country
- Length: 3:30
- Label: Polygram/Mercury 864990
- Songwriter: Toby Keith
- Producers: Nelson Larkin; Harold Shedd

Toby Keith singles chronology
"Should've Been a Cowboy" (1993)	"He Ain't Worth Missing" (1993)

"Should've Been a Cowboy" is a song written and recorded by American country music artist Toby Keith. It was released on February 12, 1993, as his debut single and the first from his self-titled debut album. On June 5, 1993, the song reached number one on the US Billboard Hot Country Songs and the Canadian RPM Country Tracks charts. It also peaked at number 93 on the Billboard Hot 100.

The song is a staple following sporting events at Oklahoma State University (home of the Cowboys), often played over the venue's PA system several times in succession as fans emptied the stadium or arena.

American Aquarium covered the song on their 2021 album Slappers, Bangers, and Certified Twangers: Vol 1.

== Content ==
The song was inspired by an incident Keith experienced at a bar in the early 1990s. According to Keith:

"This highway patrolman who I had met on the trip, his name was John, he jumps up. He was probably 45 or 50 back then, and he runs over to this 25-year-old cowgirl. He was going to show that he could bust a move. She turns him down. He comes over, and said, 'She says she doesn't dance.' About 15 minutes later, a young cowboy comes in — and off they go on the dance floor. Everybody was making fun of him, and one of the guys said, 'John, I guess you should have been a cowboy.'"

The lyrics romanticize the cowboy lifestyle through references to old Westerns. The first verse references Gunsmoke, in which cowboy hero Marshal Dillon never settled down with his love interest Miss Kitty. The second verse tells of his own adventures if the narrator were a cowboy, such as having "a sidekick with a funny name" (possibly a reference to sidekicks like Tonto or Gordito), travelling west to California (including the historical quote "Go West, young man"), hunting down Western outlaw Jesse James, joining up with the Texas Rangers. The chorus refers to famous singing cowboys Gene Autry and Roy Rogers, and lists common patterns depicted in Westerns such as six-shooters (revolvers) and cattle drives.

== Other media ==
The song is available as downloadable content on the music video game, Rock Band.

== Chart positions ==
"Should've Been a Cowboy" debuted at number 69 on the Hot Country Songs chart for the week of March 6, 1993. It became Keith's first number one single on the chart dated June 5, 1993, remaining there for two weeks. It was certified three-times platinum by the RIAA on September 18, 2023, thirty years after its release. Following Keith's death on February 5, 2024, the single re-entered the Hot Country Songs chart at number 12 on the chart week dated February 17, 2024. It was one of five Toby Keith songs to re-enter the chart that week, as well as the highest peaking.

1993 weekly chart performance for "Should've Been a Cowboy"
Chart (1993)	Peak position
Canada Country Singles (RPM)	1
US Billboard Hot 100	93
US Hot Country Songs (Billboard)	1

2024 weekly chart performance for "Should've Been a Cowboy"
Chart (2024)	Peak position
Global 200 (Billboard)	193
US Hot Country Songs (Billboard)	12

=== Year-end charts ===
Year-end chart performance for "Should've Been a Cowboy"
Chart (1993)	Position
Canada Country Tracks (RPM)	73
US Country Songs (Billboard)	39

== Certifications ==
Certifications for "Should've Been a Cowboy"
Region	Certification	Certified units/sales
United States (RIAA)	4× Platinum	4,000,000^{‡}
^{‡} Sales+streaming figures based on certification alone.
