= Lake House =

Grade I listed house in Wiltshire, United Kingdom

Coordinates: 51.1497°N 1.8100°W

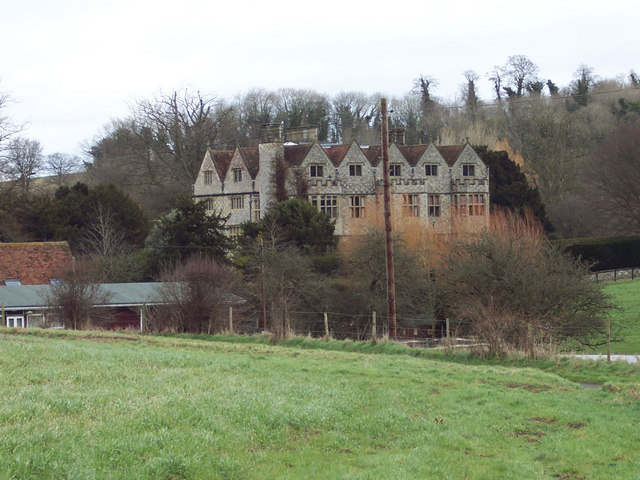
Lake House, west front

Lake House is an Elizabethan country house dating from 1578, in Wilsford cum Lake in Wiltshire, England, about 7 miles (11 km) north of Salisbury. It is a Grade I listed building. The gardens are Grade II listed in the English Heritage Register of Parks and Gardens of Special Historic Interest.

== History ==
Lake House was built in 1578 for George Duke, a wealthy clothier, shortly after he acquired the manor of Lake. The house is built of Chilmark stone, the pale limestone from which Salisbury Cathedral was also built, and flint chequerwork: its treatment at Lake House has been described as "an outstanding example of this technique". The house has two storeys, with basement and attic areas; the stone mullion windows have transoms. It has gabled terracotta-tiled roofs and the chimneys are diagonally-set. Its west front faces the road and is symmetrical, forming a five-part pattern of central projecting porch, flanked on either side by recessed windows and then at each end by semi-octagonal bay windows. The projecting bay areas carry up the full height of the two storeys and are topped by crenellations. There are five small windowed gables at roof level. The Duke family shield is above the doorway.

It is thought that the original building was L-shaped, with the principal block facing west (as today) and the shorter block running eastwards behind its northern end. It has been suggested that this north wing may incorporate part of an earlier house. A parallel wing, which partly fills the internal angle of the L, is thought to have been built to accommodate a Georgian staircase in the late 18th century.

In 1897 the house left the possession of the Duke family for the first time in nine generations, when the widow of the Rev. Edward Duke (1814–1895), who was an archaeologist and colleague of Richard Colt Hoare, sold the house. The buyer, Joseph Lovibond, had the house thoroughly restored under the direction of architect Detmar Blow, working with the advice of the Society for the Protection of Ancient Buildings. The work was considered "a showpiece of restoration at a time when methods of restoring were the subject of much controversy."

Only fifteen years later, in 1912, the house was completely gutted by fire, and all of the original period features and fittings were destroyed. Detmar Blow again oversaw the restoration, altering the plan and using appropriate late 16th- and 17th-century chimneypieces and panelling salvaged from other buildings of the period. Lovibond died in 1918 and the house and its estate was sold to Lord Glenconner, who united it with that of Wilsford. Lord Glenconner never lived in the house, instead letting it to tenants. After the death of Lord Glenconner's widow, Lady Grey (Pamela Wyndham), the house and combined estates were purchased by its second tenant, Lt. Col. F. G. G. Bailey, son of the founder of Bailey's Hotel.

In 1933 Bailey commissioned architect Darcy Braddell (husband of designer Dorothy Braddell) to make additions to the house, in a style sympathetic to the original, and again using architectural elements and internal fittings salvaged from elsewhere. At the south-east corner a single-storey dining hall was built, with a barrel-vaulted ceiling and large oriel window; a spectacular 17th-century carved stone chimneypiece; panelling and a carved frieze dated 1633, to which Bailey had his family initials added; and a plaster ceiling from a London livery company. At the same time the 18th-century wing adjoining it was given a gabled treatment to bring it into harmony with the rest of the building. To the north of the dining hall were added kitchens and offices on two levels, extending across the east part of the house. In 1956 the estates were in the ownership of Col. Bailey's widow, Lady Janet Bailey, daughter of the James Mackay, 1st Earl of Inchcape.

The house was purchased by musician Sting and his second wife Trudie Styler in 1990. Sting recorded his album Ten Summoner's Tales in the house, and the couple ran an organic farm on the estate. In 1999 Styler co-authored The Lake House Cookbook, with her chef, Joseph Sponzo, which contains photographs and information about the house. The Wiltshire fields surrounding the house inspired one of Sting's most popular songs, "Fields of Gold".

The gardens of Lake House were featured in the 2017 book The Secret Gardeners by Victoria Summerley and photographer Hugo Rittson Thomas.

== Meteorite ==
A 90 kg (200 lb) chondrite meteorite sat by the doorstep of Lake House for at least 80 years, before being donated to the Natural History Museum when the Bailey family sold Lake House in 1991; it is now on display in Salisbury Museum. It is the largest meteorite known to have fallen in the UK, and is thought to have been hidden in a prehistoric burial mound, before being excavated in the 19th century by Edward Duke.
