= Cledus T. Judd discography =

- Studio albums: 12
- EPs: 2
- Compilation albums: 2
- Singles: 40

American singer and parodist Cledus T. Judd has released 40 singles, 12 studio albums, and two extended plays. Judd made his debut in 1995 with "Indian In-Laws", a parody of Tim McGraw's 1994 single "Indian Outlaw". Judd charted for the first time in 2000 with "My Cellmate Thinks I'm Sexy", a parody of Kenny Chesney's "She Thinks My Tractor's Sexy". His highest peak came in 2004 with "I Love NASCAR", a parody of Toby Keith's "I Love This Bar". Judd's most commercially successful album is 1996's I Stoled This Record, which is certified gold by the Recording Industry Association of America (RIAA).

== Albums ==
=== Studio albums ===
Title	Album details	Peak chart positions					Certifications (sales threshold)
Title	Album details	US Country	US	US Heat	US Indie	US Comedy	Certifications (sales threshold)
Cledus T. Judd (No Relation)	Release date: June 20, 1995; Label: Razor & Tie	—	—	—	—	—	
I Stoled This Record	Release date: May 21, 1996; Label: Razor & Tie	23	173	8	—	—	US: Gold
Did I Shave My Back for This?	Release date: March 24, 1998; Label: Razor & Tie	16	181	11	—	—	
Juddmental	Release date: October 26, 1999; Label: Razor & Tie	48	—	33	—	—	
Just Another Day in Parodies	Release date: November 14, 2000; Label: Monument Records	25	198	7	—	—	
Cledus Envy	Release date: April 30, 2002; Label: Monument Records	19	136	3	—	—	
Cledus Navidad	Release date: October 15, 2002; Label: Monument Records	39	—	24	—	—	
Bipolar and Proud	Release date: August 24, 2004; Label: Audium/Koch Records	15	98	—	8	2	
Boogity, Boogity - A Tribute to the Comedic Genius of Ray Stevens	Release date: August 28, 2007; Label: Asylum-Curb Records	47	—	—	—	3	
Polyrically Uncorrect	Release date: June 30, 2009; Label: E1 Music	56	—	—	—	7	
Parodyziac!!	Release date: November 13, 2012; Label: Warner Bros. Nashville	—	—	—	—	14	
Things I Remember Before I Forget	Release date: 2016; Label: BFD	—	—	—	—	—	
"—" denotes the album failed to chart

=== Compilation albums ===
Title	Album details	Peak positions
Title	Album details	US Country
Cledus Country	Release date: March 30, 1999; Label: BMG Special Products	—
The Essenshul Cledus T. Judd	Release date: February 10, 2004; Label: Razor & Tie	61
"—" denotes releases that did not chart

== Extended plays ==
Title	Album details	Peak chart positions			
Title	Album details	US Country	US	US Heat	US Indie
A Six Pack of Judd	Release date: April 29, 2003; Label: Monument Records	19	130	—	—
The Original Dixie Hick	Release date: November 11, 2003; Label: Audium/Koch Records	62	—	39	28
"—" denotes releases that did not chart

== Singles ==
Year	Single	Peak positions	Album
Year	Single	US Country	Album
1995	"Indian In-Laws"	—	Cledus T. Judd (No Relation)
1995	"Please Take the Girl"	—	Cledus T. Judd (No Relation)
1995	"Stinkin' Problem"	—	Cledus T. Judd (No Relation)
1995	"Gone Funky"	—	Cledus T. Judd (No Relation)
1996	"If Shania Was Mine"	—	I Stoled This Record
1996	"(She's Got a Butt) Bigger Than The Beatles"	—	I Stoled This Record
1996	"Cledus Went Down to Florida"	—	I Stoled This Record
1996	"Skoal: The Grundy County Spitting Incident"	—	I Stoled This Record
1998	"Wives Do It All the Time"	—	Did I Shave My Back for This?
1998	"Every Light in the House Is Blown"	—	Did I Shave My Back for This?
1998	"First Redneck on the Internet" (with Buck Owens)	—	Did I Shave My Back for This?
1998	"Did I Shave My Back for This?"	—	Did I Shave My Back for This?
1999	"Everybody's Free (To Get Sunburned)"	—	—N/a
1999	"Coronary Life"	—	Juddmental
1999	"Shania, I'm Broke"	—	Juddmental
2000	"My Cellmate Thinks I'm Sexy"	61	Just Another Day in Parodies
2000	"How Do You Milk a Cow"	67	Just Another Day in Parodies
2001	"Plowboy"	—	Just Another Day in Parodies
2002	"Breath"	—	Cledus Envy
2002	"It's a Great Day to Be a Guy"	—	Cledus Envy
2003	"270 Somethin'"	—	A Six Pack of Judd
2003	"Where's Your Mommy?"	—	A Six Pack of Judd
2003	"Martie, Natalie, and Emily (The Continuing Saga Of)"	55	The Original Dixie Hick
2003	"The Chicks Did It"	—	The Original Dixie Hick
2004	"I Love NASCAR" (with Toby Keith; uncredited)	48	Bipolar and Proud
2004	"Bake Me a Country Ham"	58	Bipolar and Proud
2005	"Paycheck Woman"	—	Bipolar and Proud
2007	"Illegals"	58	—N/a
2007	"Gitarzan" (with Heidi Newfield)	—	Boogity, Boogity
2009	"Waitin' On Obama"	—	Polyrically Uncorrect
2009	"Garth Must Be Busy" (with Ronnie Dunn)	—	Polyrically Uncorrect
2009	"(If I Had) Kellie Pickler's Boobs"	—	Polyrically Uncorrect
2009	"Tiger by the Tail (The Tale of Tiger Woods)"	—	—N/a
2011	"If This Is Country Music"	—	Parodyziac!!
2012	"Double D Cups"	—	Parodyziac!!
2012	"The House That Broke Me"	—	Parodyziac!!
2012	"Honeymoon"	—	Parodyziac!!
2013	"Cledus T."	—	Parodyziac!!
2014	"Luke Bryan" (with Colt Ford)	—	—N/a
2018	"(Weight's Goin') Up Down, Up Down"	—	—N/a
"—" denotes releases that did not chart

=== Christmas singles ===
Year	Single	Album
1996	"Grandpa Got Runned Over by a John Deere"	I Stoled This Record
1999	"Christ-mas"	Juddmental
2009	"Christmas in Rehab"	Polyrically Uncorrect
2010	"Redneck Christmas" (with Deborah Allen)	—N/a

== Videography ==
=== Music videos ===
Year	Title	Director
1995	"Gone Funky"	Brent Carpenter
1996	"If Shania Was Mine"	Above & Beyond
1996	"(She's Got a Butt) Bigger Than the Beatles"	Scott Fund
1996	"Cledus Went Down to Florida"	John Scarpati
1997	"Skoal: The Grundy County Spitting Incident"	John Scarpati
1998	"Wives Do It All the Time"	John Lloyd Miller
1998	"Every Light in the House Is Blown"	John Lloyd Miller
1998	"First Redneck on the Internet" (with Buck Owens)	John Lloyd Miller
1999	"Did I Shave My Back for This?"	Steven Goldmann/Cledus T. Judd
1999	"Coronary Life"	Lee Abbott/Cledus T. Judd
1999	"Christ-mas"	Steven Goldmann
2000	"Shania, I'm Broke"	Lee Abbott
2000	"My Cellmate Thinks I'm Sexy"	Lee Abbott/Cledus T. Judd
2000	"How Do You Milk a Cow"	Lee Abbott/Cledus T. Judd
2001	"Plowboy"	Jon Small
2002	"Breath"	Cledus T. Judd/Peter Zavadil
2002	"It's a Great Day to Be a Guy"	Cledus T. Judd/Peter Zavadil
2003	"Where's Your Mommy?"	Michael Salomon
2004	"I Love NASCAR" (with Toby Keith)	Shaun Silva
2005	"Paycheck Woman"	Shaun Silva
2009	"Waitin' on Obama"	Cledus T. Judd/Glenn Sweitzer
2009	"Garth Must Be Busy"	The Brads
2009	"Tiger by the Tail (The Tale of Tiger Woods)"	
2012	"Double D Cups"	Ryan Lassan
2012	"The House That Broke Me"	
2013	"Honeymoon"	Laura Bell Bundy
2018	"(Weight's Goin') Up Down, Up Down"	Cledus T. Judd
2018	"Gotta Pee"	Josh McComas

=== Video albums ===
Year	Title
2000	I Stoled This Video: Release date: 2000; Label: Razor & Tie Home Video
