= III (Chad Brock album) =

Studio album by Chad Brock
- Released: September 25, 2001
- Genre: Country
- Length: 47:42
- Label: Warner Bros. Nashville
- Producers: Buddy Cannon; Norro Wilson

Chad Brock chronology
| Yes! (2000) | III (2001) |

Professional ratings
Review scores
| Source | Rating |
|---|---|
| AllMusic | 3/5 stars |
| Country Standard Time | (negative) |

III is the third studio album released by country music artist Chad Brock. It features the single "Tell Me How". The only single from the album, the song failed to make the top 40 on the US country chart; Brock exited Warner Bros' roster by the end of 2001. Three of Brock's biggest hits — "Yes!", "Ordinary Life" and "Lightning Does the Work", the latter two from his 1998 debut and the former from 2000's Yes! — are included as bonus tracks.

== Track listing ==
1. "The Thought of Bein' in Love" (Marc Beeson, Jim Collins, Chad Brock) – 3:52
2. "Park the Pickup (Kiss the Girl)" (Annie Tate, Sam Tate, Dave Berg) – 3:30
3. "Tell Me How" (Larry Stewart, John Bettis, Jason Deere) – 3:39
4. "I'd Like to See You Try" (Tom Shapiro, Rick Huckaby) – 3:56
5. "I Ain't Cryin'" (Beeson, Collins) – 4:03
6. "The Lie" (Jeff Prince, Steve Stapler, Mike Pyle) – 4:05
7. "Population Minus One" (Neil Thrasher, Wendell Mobley, Kent Blazy) – 3:56
8. "Right Now" (Joe Don Rooney, Brett James, Sam Mullins) – 3:57
9. "I'd Love to Love You" (Craig Wiseman, Collins) – 2:53
10. "Livin' in Las Vegas" (Sam Hogin, Bob Regan, Phil Barnhart) – 2:55
11. "Yes!" (Stephony Smith, Collins, Brock) – 3:23
12. "Ordinary Life" (Connie Harrington, Bonnie Baker) – 3:56
13. "Lightning Does the Work" (Kelly Garrett, John Hadley, Brock) – 3:45

== Personnel ==
- Eddie Bayers – drums
- David Briggs – piano, synthesizer
- Chad Brock – lead vocals
- Larry Byrom – acoustic guitar
- Buddy Cannon – handclapping
- Melonie Cannon – background vocals
- Jim Chapman – background vocals
- Mike Chapman – bass guitar
- J.T. Corenflos – electric guitar
- Chip Davis – background vocals
- Larry Franklin – fiddle
- Sonny Garrish – steel guitar
- Kevin "Swine" Grantt – bass guitar
- Rob Hajacos – fiddle
- Tim Hensley – banjo
- Wes Hightower – background vocals
- John Hobbs – piano, synthesizer
- Rick Huckaby – background vocals
- Paul Leim – drums, cowbell, tambourine
- B. James Lowry – acoustic guitar, electric guitar, gut string guitar
- Mark Luna – background vocals
- Randy McCormick – keyboards, Hammond organ, synthesizer
- Liana Manis – background vocals
- Dale Oliver – electric guitar
- Larry Paxton – bass guitar
- Gary Prim – piano
- Tom Roady – percussion
- John Wesley Ryles – background vocals
- Stephony Smith – background vocals
- Chalee Tennison – background vocals
- Neil Thrasher – background vocals
- Cindy Richardson-Walker – background vocals
- Biff Watson – acoustic guitar
- Bergen White – background vocals
- John Willis – electric guitar
- Norro Wilson – handclapping
- Curtis Young – background vocals

== Chart performance ==
| Chart (2001) | Peak position |
|---|---|
| U.S. Billboard Top Country Albums | 44 |
