= The Visit (song) =

Single by Chad Brock

from the album Yes!
- Released: August 5, 2000
- Genre: Country
- Length: 3:22
- Label: Warner Bros. Nashville
- Songwriter(s): Gene Ellsworth, Brad Rodgers, Charlie Stefl
- Producer(s): Norro Wilson, Buddy Cannon

Chad Brock singles chronology
"Yes!" (2000)	"The Visit" (2000)	"Tell Me How" (2001)

"The Visit" is a song originally recorded by George Jones on his 1993 album High-Tech Redneck.

It was later recorded by American country music artist Chad Brock. It was released in August 2000 as the third single from the album Yes! The song reached number 21 on the Billboard Hot Country Singles & Tracks chart. The song was written by Gene Ellsworth, Brad Rodgers and Charlie Stefl. Both Jones's and Brock's versions were produced by Buddy Cannon and Norro Wilson.

== Content ==
The song is about a man visiting his former lover, telling her that he still feels emotions for her, but that "it's time for letting go" and that he has moved on to have a relationship with another woman. In the final verse, it is revealed that the woman that the narrator is talking to has died.

Brock told CMT that "The first time I heard this song, it reminded me of 'He Stopped Loving Her Today.' It had that much power and that much passion...It was kinda strange because when you hear the first two verses you think, 'What a jerk!' Then it twists so hard at the end... it has brought grown men to tears."

== Chart performance ==
Chart (2000)	Peak position
US Bubbling Under Hot 100 (Billboard)	8
US Hot Country Songs (Billboard)	21
