= Juddmental =

Studio album by Cledus T. Judd
- Released: October 26, 1999
- Genres: Country, parody
- Label: Razor & Tie
- Producer: Cledus T. Judd; Chris "P. Cream" Clark

Cledus T. Judd chronology
Did I Shave My Back for This? (1998)	Juddmental (1999)	Just Another Day in Parodies (2000)

Professional ratings
Review scores
Source	Rating
Allmusic	link

Juddmental is the fourth album from country music parodist Cledus T. Judd. It was his last album for Razor & Tie Records before leaving for Monument Records in 2000.

The track "Ricky Tidwell's Mama's Gonna Play Football" was previously recorded by comedian and singer Tim Wilson (as "Ricky Tidwell's Mama") on his album It's a Sorry World.

== Track listing ==
1. "She's Inflatable"
  - parody of "Unbelievable" by Diamond Rio
2. "Coronary Life"
  - parody of "Ordinary Life" by Chad Brock
3. "Ricky Tidwell's Mama's Gonna Play Football"
  - original song
  - feat. Daryle Singletary
4. "Christ-Mas"
  - parody of "This Kiss" by Faith Hill
5. "Cledus the Karaoke King"
  - original song
6. "Shania, I'm Broke"
  - parody of "Honey, I'm Home" by Shania Twain
7. "Where the Grass Don't Grow"
  - parody of "Where the Green Grass Grows" by Tim McGraw
8. "Hillbilly Honeymoon"
  - original song
9. "In Another Size"
  - parody of "In Another's Eyes" by Garth Brooks and Trisha Yearwood
  - credited to "Waite Gaines with Patricia Earwood"
10. "Livin' Like John Travolta"
  - parody of "Livin' La Vida Loca" by Ricky Martin

== Chart performance ==
Chart (1999)	Peak position
U.S. Billboard Top Country Albums	48
U.S. Billboard Top Heatseekers	33
