= Starkissed =

Starkissed may refer to:

- Starkissed (album) (2025), by South Korean boy band Tomorrow X Together
- "Starkissed", a song from Cledus T. Judd's 2004 album Bipolar and Proud
- "Starkissed", 1975 single by Dragon (band)

== See also ==
- StarKist, a brand of tuna produced by StarKist Co.
