= Yes! (Chad Brock album) =

Studio album by Chad Brock
- Released: May 2, 2000
- Genre: Country
- Length: 36:24
- Label: Warner Bros. Nashville
- Producers: Buddy Cannon; Norro Wilson

Chad Brock chronology
Chad Brock (1998)	Yes! (2000)	III (2001)

Singles from Yes!
- 1. "A Country Boy Can Survive (Y2K Version)" Released: November 22, 1999; 2. "Yes!" Released: February 21, 2000; 3. "The Visit" Released: August 5, 2000

Professional ratings
Review scores
Source	Rating
AllMusic	2/5 stars
Country Standard Time	(not rated)
Entertainment Weekly	(B)

Yes! is the second studio album by American country music artist Chad Brock, released on May 2, 2000. Lead-off single "A Country Boy Can Survive (Y2K Version)", featuring George Jones and Hank Williams, Jr., is a rewritten version of Williams' hit "A Country Boy Can Survive", rewritten to address the Y2K problem. This song peaked at No. 30 on the country charts in late 1999. Following it were the title track, which became Brock's only Number One hit in mid-2000, and finally "The Visit" at No. 21.

== Track listing ==
No.	Title	Writer(s)	Length
1.	"Yes!"	Jim Collins, Chad Brock, Stephony Smith	3:24
2.	"Hey Mister"	Dale Oliver, Dave Robbins, Kim Tribble	3:48
3.	"Young Enough to Know It All"	Rick Giles, Giles Goddard, Tim Nichols	3:12
4.	"The Visit"	Brad Rodgers, Charles Stefl, Gene Ellsworth	3:22
5.	"She Does"	Craig Wiseman, Chris Farren	4:02
6.	"Love Lives (Events of the Heart)"	Skip Ewing, Danny Wilde	4:17
7.	"This"	Smith, Collins, Brock	3:19
8.	"You Had to Be There"	Walt Aldridge, James LeBlanc	3:48
9.	"A Country Boy Can Survive (Y2K version)" (featuring Hank Williams Jr. and George Jones)	Hank Williams Jr.	3:59
10.	"If I Were You" (duet with Mark Wills)	Billy Dean, Verlon Thompson	3:06

== Personnel ==
From Yes! liner notes.

- Eddie Bayers – drums (tracks 1, 2)
- Chad Brock – lead vocals (all tracks)
- Pat Buchanan – electric guitar (tracks 3, 7, 9)
- Melanie Cannon – background vocals (tracks 3, 4)
- J.T. Corenflos – electric guitar (tracks 1, 2, 4, 5, 6, 8)
- Eric Darken – percussion (track 6)
- Dan Dugmore – banjo (track 3), steel guitar (tracks 3, 7, 9, 10), lap steel guitar (track 9)
- Sonny Garrish – steel guitar (1, 2, 4, 5, 6, 8)
- Rob Hajacos – fiddle (all tracks)
- Ted Hewitt – background vocals (3, 4, 6)
- Wes Hightower – background vocals (track 6)
- John Hobbs – B-3 organ (tracks 5, 9), keyboards (tracks 4, 10), piano (tracks 3, 6, 7, 8, 9, 10), percussion (track 5)
- George Jones – featured vocals (track 9)
- John Jorgenson – electric guitar (track 6)
- Paul Leim – drums (all tracks except 1 and 2), percussion (tracks 4, 5), tambourine (track 3)
- B. James Lowry – acoustic guitar (all tracks), electric guitar (track 1)
- Mark Luna – background vocals (tracks 1, 7)
- Liana Manis – background vocals (tracks 2, 5, 8)
- Randy McCormick – B-3 organ (tracks 1, 2, 6, 8), keyboards (tracks 1, 2, 8, 9), piano (tracks 4, 5)
- Terry McMillan – harmonica (tracks 4, 9), percussion (tracks 8, 9)
- Larry Paxton – bass guitar (all tracks), tic-tac bass (track 3)
- Gary Prim – piano (tracks 1, 2)
- John Wesley Ryles – background vocals (tracks 2, 5, 8)
- Stephony Smith – background vocals (tracks 1, 7)
- Hank Williams Jr. – featured vocals (track 9)
- John Willis – 12-string electric guitar (track 8), electric guitar (tracks 1, 4, 6)
- Mark Wills – features vocals (track 10)
- Dennis Wilson – background vocals (tracks 2, 5, 8)

== Charts ==
Chart (2000)	Peak position
U.S. Billboard 200	125
U.S. Billboard Top Country Albums	17
U.S. Billboard Top Heatseekers	3
Canadian RPM Country Albums	21
