= Toby Keith's I Love This Bar & Grill =

Restaurant and bar chain in Las Vegas, Nevada

- Type: Limited Liability Company
- Industry: Restaurants, bars
- Genre: Casual dining
- Founded: 2005
- Founder: Boomtown Entertainment
- Number of locations: 2
- Key people: Toby Keith
- Products: Alcoholic beverages, french fries, hamburgers, steak
- Owner: Hal Smith Restaurant Group
- Website: tobykeithsbar.com

Toby Keith's I Love This Bar & Grill is a restaurant chain inspired by the country music singer Toby Keith and founded by Boomtown Entertainment. The bar is named after Keith's 2003 single "I Love This Bar", which was taken from his eighth studio album Shock'n Y'all.

Toby Keith's Bar & Grill locations operate as full-service restaurants with large bars in the shape of guitars. They primarily serve American cuisine, especially Southern food. The bars regularly have live musical entertainment from local performers without a cover charge. During his lifetime, Keith himself made surprise visits to franchises, where he performed and socialized with fans.

Later, new restaurants were opened as a franchise under Scottsdale, Arizona-based Capri Restaurant Group Enterprises LLC, owned by Frank Capri, which purchased the master license agreement to build more Toby Keith restaurants nationwide.

The franchise collapsed through the 2010s. By 2020, lawsuits across the country had resulted in Capri and his companies being ordered to pay tens of millions of dollars in civil judgements. Capri was revealed to be an ex-mobster who used the Toby Keith-branded restaurants, along with Rascal Flatts-branded restaurants, to defraud developers.

After the closures and following the death of Toby Keith in 2024, only two locations remain open, neither owned by Boomtown Entertainment. Both are located in Oklahoma and are operated by Hal Smith Restaurant Group.

== Opening and expansion ==
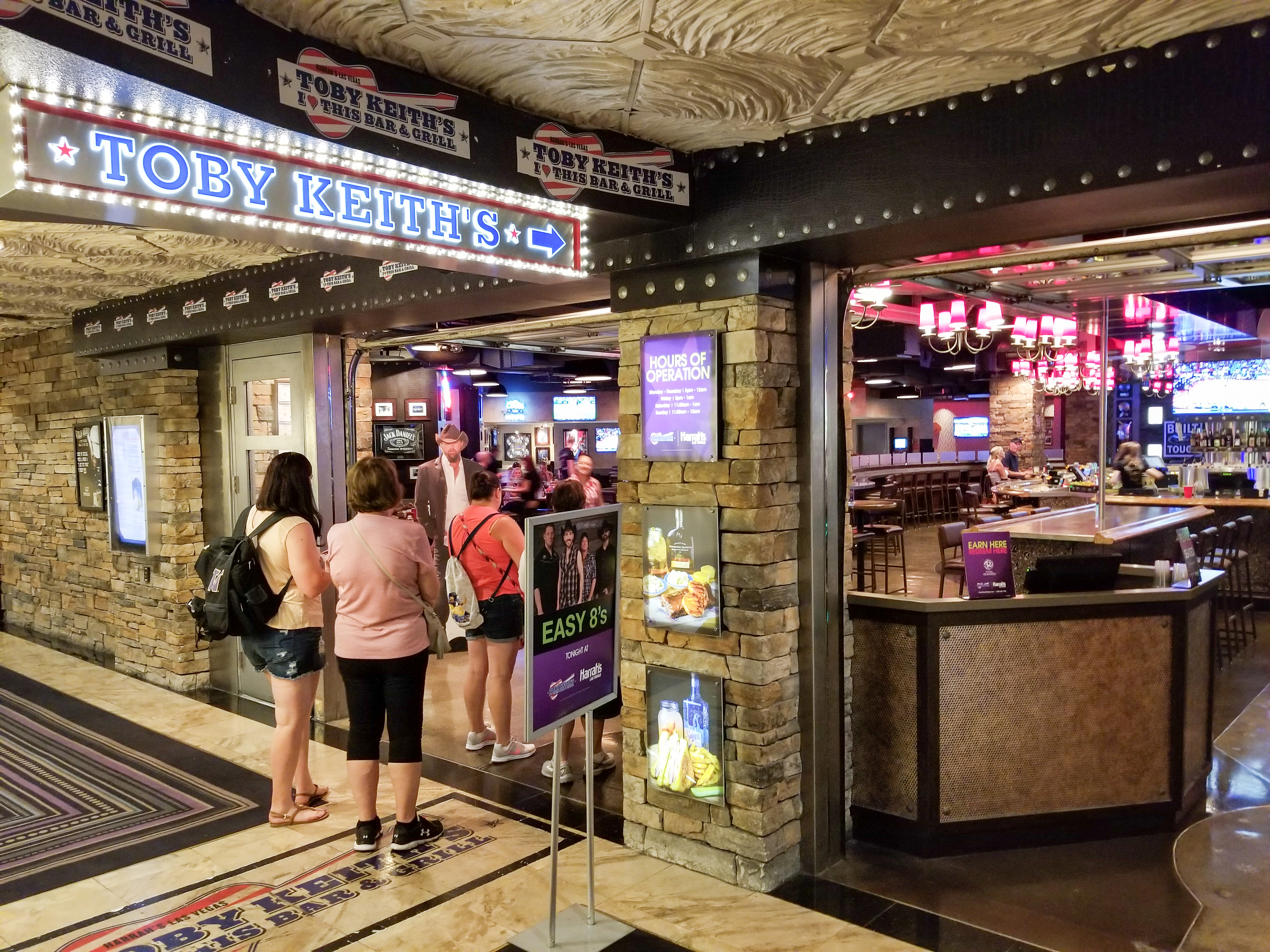
Toby Keith's I Love This Bar & Grill in Las Vegas

The first Toby Keith's I Love This Bar & Grill restaurants opened in 2005 in Oklahoma, Keith's native state, in Oklahoma City and at the Hard Rock Hotel & Casino Tulsa in Tulsa. Restaurants at the Chickasaw Nation's WinStar World Casino in Thackerville, Oklahoma and in Las Vegas, Nevada, soon followed.

From the spring of 2009 through 2010, A Toby Keith’s I Love this Bar and Grill explanded rapidly, opening locations across the country, including Auburn Hills, Michigan; Mesa, Arizona; St. Louis Park, Minnesota; and Denver, Colorado.

In April 2010, the New England Patriots announced that the first New England I Love This Bar & Grill was to be located at the Patriot Place complex outside Gillette Stadium in Foxborough, Massachusetts. It opened in May 2011.

In March 2011, a Dallas location was announced for half of the former AMC Grand 24 multiplex. That location opened on May 15, 2012, with a formal grand opening in September 2012. When it opened, the Dallas location was the second-largest in the chain.

In early 2013 a location opened in Syracuse, New York at the newly constructed Destiny USA.

Other locations existed in Peoria, Arizona, Cincinnati, Ohio, City Center at Oyster Point in Newport News, Virginia and Rancho Cucamonga, California and Rosemont, Illinois until 2015.

== Timeline of closings ==
=== 2014 ===
- January: The location in Dallas, Texas closed abruptly for not paying their rent.
- March 7: The location in Tucson, Arizona, closed abruptly after being evicted by General Growth Properties for breach of contract.
- December 30: The location in Folsom, California, closed abruptly. It had been open since 2012.

=== 2015 ===
- January 1: The location at City Center in Newport News, Virginia, closed. At the time of their eviction, the restaurant owed City Center more than $554,000 in delinquent rent and fees.
- January 3: The location in Houston, Texas, closed due to unpaid rent.
- May 2: The location in Woodbridge, Virginia, closed.
- April 7: The location in the Savannah Mall in Savannah, Georgia, was given their final notice of eviction. The restaurant that was to open August 2014 never did.
- May 3: The location at The Collection at RiverPark in Oxnard, California, closed after being open less than a year. As of September 28, 2014, they were behind over $605,000 in back rent.
- May 17: The location in the Destiny USA mall in Syracuse, New York, closed abruptly and without notice amid rumors of a rent dispute with the mall owners.
- June 3: The location at The Wharf in Orange Beach, Alabama, was padlocked and posted with a notice of eviction.
- June 24: The location at St. Louis Park, Minnesota, closed abruptly.
- July 2: The location at Artegon Marketplace in Orlando, Florida, closed abruptly. It had opened in late December 2014.
- July 13: The location in Cincinnati closed.
- September 3: It was announced that the location in Phoenix, Arizona, had closed. The other Arizona location, in Peoria, had closed previously over the summer.
- September 14: The location at Victoria Gardens, in Rancho Cucamonga, California, became the latest restaurant in the chain to close without any notice.
- September: The Northfield location in Denver, Colorado, closed abruptly. The City of Denver auctioned off all contents in October 2015 to recoup over $70,000 in back taxes.
- October: The Rosemont, Illinois, location closed.
- October: A location in Newark, CA was set to open. Located at Newpark Mall. Much of the work was completed but the restaurant never opened.
- September 9: The location at the Great Lakes Crossing Outlets in Auburn Hills, Michigan, closed permanently after having their liquor license suspended due to repeated violations.

=== 2019 ===
- January 29: The location at Patriot Place in Foxborough, Massachusetts, closed abruptly. It was replaced by Six String Grill & Stage, which kept the guitar-shaped bar and live music stage.

=== 2020 ===
- March: The Las Vegas, Nevada location at Harrah's closed due to the COVID-19 pandemic and never reopened.

== See also ==
- Cheeseburger in Paradise (restaurant)
- Hard Rock Cafe
- Jimmy Buffett's Margaritaville
