= Ordinary Life =

Single by Chad Brock

from the album Chad Brock
- B-side: "My Memory Ain't What It Used to Be"
- Released: November 2, 1998
- Genre: Country
- Length: 3:57
- Label: Warner Bros. Nashville
- Songwriters: Connie Harrington, Bonnie Baker
- Producers: Buddy Cannon and Norro Wilson

Chad Brock singles chronology
"Evangeline" (1998)	"Ordinary Life" (1998)	"Lightning Does the Work" (1999)

"Ordinary Life" is a song written by Connie Harrington and Bonnie Baker, and recorded by American country music artist Chad Brock. It was released as the second single in November 1998 from his self-titled debut album, it peaked at number 3 on the Billboard Hot Country Singles & Tracks chart, giving Brock his first Top 10 single.

== Content ==
The song is a mid-tempo backed primarily by piano and acoustic guitar. It begins with a woman named Shelly at the kitchen table with the morning newspaper, when her husband walks in the kitchen, who is upset that he can't take his "ordinary life" anymore.

In the second verse, Shelly is still at the kitchen table, when her son comes up to her with a picture of him with Shelly. When the boy says his prayers, Shelly says that she is thankful for the ordinary life. By the song's bridge, the husband calls her from the airport at midnight, saying that he is "all alone again" and is missing his ordinary life.

== Music video ==
The music video was directed by R. Brad Murano and premiered in late 1998.

== Chart performance ==
The song debuted at number 63 on the Hot Country Singles & Tracks chart dated November 7, 1998. It charted for 29 weeks on that chart, and peaked at number 3 on the chart dated April 10, 1999, becoming Brock's first Top Five single on that chart. In addition, it was his first Top 40 hit on the Billboard Hot 100, peaking at number 39 on that chart.

Chart (1998–1999)	Peak position
Canada Country Singles (RPM)	10
US Billboard Hot 100	39
US Hot Country Songs (Billboard)	3

=== Year-end charts ===
Chart (1999)	Position
Canada Country Tracks (RPM)	79
US Country Songs (Billboard)	29

== Parodies ==
The song was parodied by country music parodist Cledus T. Judd for his CD, Juddmental, as "Coronary Life." Chad Brock himself appeared in the music video as a doctor.
