= Whiskey Girl =

Single by Toby Keith

from the album Shock'n Y'all
- B-side: "Nights I Can't Remember, Friends I'll Never Forget"
- Released: March 22, 2004
- Recorded: 2003
- Genre: Country
- Length: 3:59
- Label: DreamWorks Nashville
- Songwriters: Toby Keith, Scotty Emerick
- Producers: James Stroud, Toby Keith

Toby Keith singles chronology
"American Soldier" (2003)	"Whiskey Girl" (2004)	"Hey, Good Lookin'" (2004)

"Whiskey Girl" is a song co-written and recorded by American country music singer Toby Keith. The "Whiskey Girl", was model Kerry Summerville out of Pittsburgh, PA who spent years off and on touring with Keith. Released in March 2004, it was the third and final single from his 2003 album Shock'n Y'all. The song reached number one on the US Billboard Hot Country Singles & Tracks chart in July 2004. A live version is included on the deluxe edition of his 2012 album Hope on the Rocks. Keith wrote this song with Scotty Emerick.

== Content ==
The song's narrator describes his girlfriend as his "little whiskey girl." In the video, she is the object of fantasy for a mechanic at an autoshop Keith is visiting. According to Scotty Emerick, the little whiskey girl is "the epitome of a redneck girl who ain't into wine and beer or tequila".

== Music video ==
Amy Weber, a WWE Diva, appeared in the music video, which was directed by Michael Salomon. The video premiered on CMT on March 27, 2004 during CMT 3rd Shift. In the music video, Weber was in an auto mechanic suit, and then, she took off her auto mechanic mask, and suit, and her belly button was shown attached by piercing jewelry, and then she goes with a man to a bar, and giving her a bottle of whiskey.

== Chart performance ==
"Whiskey Girl" debuted at number 59 on the U.S. Billboard Hot Country Singles & Tracks for the week of March 20, 2004.

Chart (2004)	Peak position
Canada Country (Radio & Records)	10
US Hot Country Songs (Billboard)	1
US Billboard Hot 100	31

=== Year-end charts ===
Chart (2004)	Position
US Country Songs (Billboard)	30

== Certifications ==
Region	Certification	Certified units/sales
United States (RIAA)	Platinum	1,000,000^{‡}
^{‡} Sales+streaming figures based on certification alone.
