= Chad Brock (album) =

Studio album by Chad Brock
- Released: October 20, 1998
- Genre: Country
- Length: 36:27
- Label: Warner Bros. Nashville
- Producer: Buddy Cannon; Norro Wilson

Chad Brock chronology
Chad Brock (1998)	Yes! (2000)

Singles from Chad Brock
- 1. "Evangeline" Released: August 31, 1998; 2. "Ordinary Life" Released: November 2, 1998; 3. "Lightning Does the Work" Released: March 2, 1999

Professional ratings
Review scores
Source	Rating
Country Standard Time	(not rated)

Chad Brock is the debut studio album by American country music artist Chad Brock. Released in 1998 (see 1998 in country music) on Warner Bros. Records Nashville, the album produced three chart singles for Brock on the Billboard country charts between 1998 and 1999. In order of release, these were "Ordinary Life" (#3), "Lightning Does the Work" (#19) and "Evangeline" (#51). "Evangeline" was covered by Sammy Kershaw on his 2006 album Honky Tonk Boots, which was also produced by Buddy Cannon and Norro Wilson. "You Made a Liar Out of Me" was co-written by Rich Alves of Pirates of the Mississippi.

== Track listing ==
No.	Title	Writer(s)	Length
1.	"Going the Distance"	Walt Aldridge; John Jarrard	3:37
2.	"Evangeline"	Bob McDill; Carson Chamberlain	3:51
3.	"You Made a Liar Out of Me"	Rich Alves; Brad Cotter; J. B. Rudd	3:45
4.	"Bingo Bull's-Eye"	Jason Deere; Kelly Garrett	3:18
5.	"Ordinary Life"	Connie Harrington; Bonnie Baker	3:57
6.	"If It Were Up to Me"	Stephony Smith; Jim Collins	3:29
7.	"'Til I Fell for You"	Noah Gordon; Tom Snyder	3:20
8.	"Lightning Does the Work"	Garrett; John Hadley; Chad Brock	3:47
9.	"Un-Break My Heart"	C. Brock; Buddy Brock; Jeff Silvey	3:35
10.	"I Wonder Where Love Goes"	C. Brock; B. Brock; Phil Douglas	3:48
Total length:			36:27

== Personnel ==
From Chad Brock liner notes.

Musicians

- Eddie Bayers – drums (except 7)
- Chad Brock – lead vocals (all tracks), background vocals (3)
- Larry Byrom – acoustic guitar (all tracks)
- Jim Chapman – background vocals (1, 8)
- J. T. Corenflos – electric guitar (all tracks), 12-string guitar (4), acoustic guitar (4)
- Glen Duncan – fiddle (7)
- Larry Franklin – fiddle (1, 3, 4, 8)
- Paul Franklin – steel guitar (7)
- Sonny Garrish – steel guitar (except 7)
- Rob Hajacos – fiddle (2, 5, 6, 9, 10)
- John Hobbs – piano, synthesizer (2, 5)
- David Hungate – bass guitar (7)
- Rodger Morris – synthesizer (1, 3, 4)
- Larry Paxton – bass guitar (except 7)
- Brent Rowan – electric guitar (7)
- John Wesley Ryles – background vocals (2, 6, 7, 9)
- Dawn Sears – background vocals (10)
- Cindy Richardson-Walker – background vocals (1, 3, 4, 5, 7, 8)
- Bergen White – background vocals (5, 10)
- Dennis Wilson – background vocals (2, 6, 9)
- Lonnie Wilson – drums (7)
- Curtis Young – background vocals (1, 3, 4, 5, 8, 10)
- Reggie Young – electric guitar (6)

Additional vocals on "Evangeline": Buddy Cannon, Susan Marshall-Clinton, Dillon Dixon, Adam Hughes, Lesa Reneé, Melonie Cannon-Richardson, Ray Scott, Norro Wilson

Technical

- Chris Lord-Alge – mixing
- Terry Bates – engineering
- Kevin Beamish – engineering
- Bob Bullock – engineering
- Buddy Cannon – production
- Billy Sherrill – engineering
- Hank Williams – mastering
- Norro Wilson – production

== Chart performance ==
Chart (1999)	Peak position
US Top Country Albums (Billboard)	37
US Heatseekers Albums (Billboard)	31

=== Singles ===
Title	Date	Chart	Peak position
"Ordinary Life"	April 9, 1999	US Hot Country Songs (Billboard)	3
"Lightning Does the Work"	October 15, 1999	US Hot Country Songs (Billboard)	19
"Evangeline"	August 28, 1998	US Hot Country Songs (Billboard)	51
