= Shock'n Y'all =

Studio album by Toby Keith
- Released: November 4, 2003
- Genre: Country
- Length: 50:21
- Label: DreamWorks
- Producers: James Stroud; Toby Keith

Toby Keith chronology
| 20th Century Masters – The Millennium Collection: The Best of Toby Keith (2003) | Shock'n Y'all (2003) | Greatest Hits 2 (2004) |

Singles from Shock'n Y'all
- 1. "I Love This Bar" Released: August 18, 2003; 2. "American Soldier" Released: November 24, 2003; 3. "Whiskey Girl" Released: March 22, 2004

Professional ratings
Aggregate scores
| Source | Rating |
|---|---|
| Metacritic | (71/100) |
Review scores
| Source | Rating |
| 411Mania | (8/10) |
| About.com | 5/5 stars |
| Allmusic | 4.5/5 stars |
| Blender | 2/5 stars |
| E! Online | C |
| Entertainment Weekly | B |
| Los Angeles Times | 2.5/4 stars |
| People | 2/4 stars |
| Plugged In (publication) | (mixed) |
| Rolling Stone | 2/5 stars |
| The Village Voice | (positive) |

Shock'n Y'all is the ninth studio album by American country music artist Toby Keith. It was released on November 4, 2003 by DreamWorks Records. The album features 10 studio tracks and the 2 live "Bus Songs". The album has been certified 4× Platinum in the U.S. for shipments in excess of 4 million units.

"I Love This Bar", "American Soldier" and "Whiskey Girl" were the three tracks from the album to be released as singles, and all reached Number One on the Hot Country Songs charts. "I Love This Bar" has inspired a chain of restaurants that Keith has launched under the name Toby Keith's I Love This Bar & Grill.

Keith wrote or co-wrote 11 of the 12 songs with his frequent collaborator Scotty Emerick, who also sings backup vocals on the live tracks.

== Track listing ==
| No. | Title | Writer(s) | Length |
|---|---|---|---|
| 1. | "I Love This Bar" | Toby Keith; Scotty Emerick | 5:35 |
| 2. | "Whiskey Girl" | Keith; Emerick | 3:59 |
| 3. | "American Soldier" | Keith; Chuck Cannon | 4:23 |
| 4. | "If I Was Jesus" | Cannon; Phil Madeira | 3:44 |
| 5. | "Time for Me to Ride" | Keith; Cannon | 5:22 |
| 6. | "Sweet" | Keith; Emerick; Cannon | 3:06 |
| 7. | "Don't Leave, I Think I Love You" | Keith; Ronnie Dunn | 3:46 |
| 8. | "Nights I Can't Remember, Friends I'll Never Forget" | Keith; Emerick | 4:00 |
| 9. | "Baddest Boots" | Keith | 4:23 |
| 10. | "The Critic" | Keith | 4:02 |

Bonus tracks
| No. | Title | Writer(s) | Length |
|---|---|---|---|
| 11. | "The Taliban Song" (duet with Scotty Emerick (uncredited)) | Keith; Emerick | 3:58^{A} |
| 12. | "Weed with Willie" (duet with Scotty Emerick (uncredited)) | Keith; Emerick | 4:03^{A} |

Notes

- ^{A}Live tracks.

== Personnel ==
Adapted from liner notes.

- Mike Brignardello - bass guitar on "Baddest Boots"
- Mark Casstevens - acoustic guitar on "Baddest Boots"
- Scotty Emerick - acoustic guitar, vocals on "The Taliban Song" and "Weed With Willie"
- Shannon Forrest - drums
- Paul Franklin - steel guitar
- Kenny Greenberg - electric guitar on "Baddest Boots"
- Wes Hightower - background vocals
- Clayton Ivey - keyboards, piano
- Toby Keith - lead vocals
- Julian King - percussion, trumpet, background vocals
- Jerry McPherson - electric guitar
- Phil Madeira - Dobro on "If I Was Jesus"
- Brent Mason - electric guitar
- Steve Nathan - keyboards, piano
- John Wesley Ryles - background vocals
- James Stroud - percussion, background vocals
- Biff Watson - acoustic guitar
- Glenn Worf - bass guitar

== Charts ==
=== Weekly charts ===
| Chart (2003) | Peak position |
|---|---|
| US Billboard 200 | 1 |
| US Top Country Albums (Billboard) | 1 |

=== Year-end charts ===
| Chart (2003) | Position |
|---|---|
| US Billboard 200 | 72 |
| US Top Country Albums (Billboard) | 10 |
| Worldwide Albums (IFPI) | 23 |

| Chart (2004) | Position |
|---|---|
| US Billboard 200 | 7 |
| US Top Country Albums (Billboard) | 1 |

| Chart (2005) | Position |
|---|---|
| US Top Country Albums (Billboard) | 33 |

== Certifications ==
| Region | Certification | Certified units/sales |
|---|---|---|
| Canada (Music Canada) | Platinum | 100,000^{^} |
| United States (RIAA) | 4× Platinum | 4,000,000^{^} |
^{^} Shipments figures based on certification alone.
