= Cledus Navidad =

Studio album by Cledus T. Judd
- Released: October 15, 2002
- Genres: Country, Parody
- Label: Monument
- Producers: Cledus T. Judd; Chris "P. Cream" Clark

Cledus T. Judd chronology
Cledus Envy (2002)	Cledus Navidad (2002)	A Six Pack of Judd (2003)

Professional ratings
Review scores
Source	Rating
Allmusic	link

Cledus Navidad is a Christmas album released by country music artist Cledus T. Judd. The track "Merry Christmas from the Whole Fam Damily", included here, was previously on his 2000 album Just Another Day in Parodies. Also featured are two cover songs: "Grandma Got Run Over by a Reindeer" (originally recorded by Elmo & Patsy) and "Santa Claus Is Watching You" (originally recorded by Ray Stevens). "Stephon the Alternative Lifestyle Reindeer" was later recorded by Mac McAnally on his 2004 album Semi-True Stories.

== Track listing ==
1. "Cledus' Christmas Ball" (Brett Beavers, Jim Beavers, Mike Waldron) – 2:55
2. "Stephon the Alternative Lifestyle Reindeer" (Mac McAnally) – 3:15
3. "Hazel's Homemade Hallelujah Punch" (Chris Clark, Richard Fagan) – 2:57
4. "Grandma Got Run Over by a Reindeer" (Randy Brooks) – 4:02
5. "Only 364 Shopping Days 'Til Christmas" (Bruce Burch, Clark, Cledus T. Judd) – 3:14
6. "Tree's on Fire" – 2:34
  - parody of "Ring of Fire" by Johnny Cash; parody lyrics written by Dennis Amero
7. "Don't Serve Beans" (Dennis Amero, Robert Ellis Orrall) – 3:35
8. "Merry Christmas from the Whole Fam Damily" (Clark, Judd) – 4:14
9. "Santa Claus Is Watching You" (Ray Stevens) – 3:12
10. "All I Want for Christmas Is Two Gold Front Teef" – 2:59
  - parody of "All I Want for Christmas Is My Two Front Teeth" by Spike Jones and The City Slickers; parody lyrics by Chris Clark

== Chart performance ==
Chart (2002)	Peak position
U.S. Billboard Top Country Albums	39
U.S. Billboard Top Heatseekers	24
