= Cledus Envy =

Studio album by Cledus T. Judd
- Released: April 30, 2002
- Genres: Country, parody
- Label: Monument
- Producers: Cledus T. Judd, Chris "P. Cream" Clark

Cledus T. Judd chronology
| Just Another Day in Parodies (2000) | Cledus Envy (2002) | Cledus Navidad (2002) |

Professional ratings
Review scores
| Source | Rating |
|---|---|
| Allmusic | link |

Cledus Envy is a 2002 album released by country music parodist Cledus T. Judd, released on Monument Records. It features "Leave You Laughin'", Judd's first serious song. Phil Vassar contributes a spoken line to the end of "Just Another Day in Parodies".

The compact disc was released with a bonus multimedia disc, containing the video for the song "Breath".

== Track listing ==
1. "It's a Great Day to Be a Guy"
  - parody of "It's a Great Day to Be Alive" by Travis Tritt
2. "Breath"
  - parody of "Breathe" by Faith Hill
3. "Willie's Got a Big Deck"
  - original song
4. "Let's Burn One"
  - original song
5. "My Voice"
  - parody of "One Voice" by Billy Gilman
6. "Man of Constant Borrow"
  - parody of "I Am a Man of Constant Sorrow" by the Soggy Bottom Boys
  - feat. Diamond Rio
7. "Let's Shoot Dove"
  - parody of "Let's Make Love" by Faith Hill & Tim McGraw
8. "1/2"
  - parody of "Yes!" by Chad Brock
9. "If George Strait Starts Dancin'"
  - original song
10. "Just Another Day in Parodies"
  - parody of "Just Another Day in Paradise" by Phil Vassar
11. "Leave You Laughin'"
  - original song
12. "Don't Mess with America"
  - parody of "Only in America" by Brooks & Dunn

== Chart performance ==
| Chart (2002) | Peak position |
|---|---|
| U.S. Billboard Top Country Albums | 19 |
| U.S. Billboard 200 | 136 |
| U.S. Billboard Top Heatseekers | 3 |
