= American Soldier (song) =

Single by Toby Keith

from the album Shock'n Y'all
- Released: November 24, 2003
- Recorded: 2003
- Genre: Country
- Length: 4:23 (album version); 3:39 (radio edit)
- Label: DreamWorks
- Songwriters: Chuck Cannon; Toby Keith
- Producers: Toby Keith; James Stroud

Toby Keith singles chronology
"I Love This Bar" (2003)	"American Soldier" (2003)	"Whiskey Girl" (2004)

"American Soldier" is a song co-written and recorded by American country music artist Toby Keith. It was released on November 24, 2003, as the second single from his eight studio album Shock'n Y'all (2003). It became a number one hit on the Billboard U.S. Hot Country Songs chart, keeping the top spot for four weeks. Keith wrote the song with Chuck Cannon.

== Background and writing ==
Keith said that the song was written "for all the times that I get to meet the troops on these USO tours, and since Courtesy of Red, White, and Blue, the P.O.W.s and the families that have come and brought me back my old CD covers and stuff that they had and shown how much support they had (for me), this is my support for the American fighting men and women."

== Content ==
"American Soldier" is about an American in the Army Reserves. As he gets dressed and packs his bags for deployment, various clips show soldiers from different wars throughout U.S. history. Although each soldier is in a different battle and time period (the American Civil War, World War I, World War II, the Vietnam War, the Gulf War and the present war on terror), they are all meant to exemplify the traits of an American soldier: loyalty, fearlessness, and bravery. Meanwhile, the family arrives at a U.S. military base where the protagonist will be flown off to training camp. After saying goodbye to his wife and children, he boards a United States Air Force Boeing C-17 Globemaster III, ready to serve his country.

== Critical reception ==
Ray Waddell, of Billboard magazine reviewed the song favorably, saying that Keith "makes his politics readily apparent on the gentle, powerful" song.

== Commercial performance ==
"American Soldier" debuted at number 53 on the U.S. Billboard Hot Country Songs chart on the chart dated November 22, 2003, at the same time that Keith's previous single "I Love This Bar" was at number one. It was certified Platinum by the Recording Industry Association of America (RIAA) on December 10, 2013, slightly more than ten years after its release. The song reached its millionth digital sales mark in the US in January 2017, and has sold 1,032,000 as of July 2017.

== Music video ==
The music video was directed by Michael Salomon, and premiered on CMT on December 13, 2003. Toby Keith traveled to Edwards Air Force Base in Edwards, California to film the song's music video, featuring off-duty soldiers, reservists, and their families. The video begins with a man getting a phone call early one morning to go to war. He gets himself and his family ready in the morning, the service member acting like it's just another day, and they head off to a military base for him to leave for the war. He hugs his wife and kids, and gets on the plane, while his family watches sadly and wave goodbye from the gate as the plane leaves. The scenes are also intercut with soldiers from the Civil War, World War I, World War II, Vietnam, and Desert Storm. The video also features Keith performing in a military aircraft hangar.

== Charts ==
=== Weekly charts ===
Chart (2003–2004)	Peak position
US Hot Country Songs (Billboard)	1
US Billboard Hot 100	28

=== Year-end charts ===
Chart (2004)	Position
US Billboard Hot 100	90
US Country Songs (Billboard)	6

== Certifications ==
Region	Certification	Certified units/sales
United States (RIAA)	2× Platinum	2,000,000^{‡}
^{‡} Sales+streaming figures based on certification alone.
