= Cledus T. Judd (No Relation) =

Studio album by Cledus T. Judd
- Released: June 20, 1995
- Genre: Country
- Length: 34:08
- Label: Razor & Tie
- Producer: Cledus T. Judd

Cledus T. Judd chronology
Cledus T. Judd (No Relation) (1995)	I Stoled This Record (1996)

Professional ratings
Review scores
Source	Rating
AllMusic	3/5 stars

Cledus T. Judd (No Relation) is the self-titled debut album of country music parodist Cledus T. Judd. The album's title is a reference to the popularity of country duo The Judds, stating that he has "no relation" to them. The album features seven parodies of popular songs, two original tunes ("Katie Bar the Door" and "Shade Tree Mechanic"), and a rap version of John Anderson's 1983 number-one single "Swingin'".

== Track listing ==
1. "Gone Funky" (Cledus T. Judd) – 3:14
  - parody of "Gone Country" by Alan Jackson (Bob McDill)
2. "Indian In-Laws" (Bruce Burch, Jody Jackson, Judd) – 2:59
  - parody of "Indian Outlaw" by Tim McGraw (Tommy Barnes, Jumpin' Gene Simmons, John D. Loudermilk)
3. "Katie Bar the Door" (Burch, Judd, Freddy Weller) – 2:56
  - original song
4. "Swingin'" (John Anderson, Lionel Delmore) – 3:24
  - Rap version of John Anderson's 1983 single "Swingin'"
5. "Refried Beans" (Burch, Judd, Daniel Sarenana) – 2:33
  - parody of "Refried Dreams" by Tim McGraw (Jim Foster, Mark Petersen)
6. "Motel Californie" (Judd, Sarenana) – 5:06
  - parody of "Hotel California" by the Eagles (Don Felder, Glenn Frey, Don Henley)
7. "Please Take the Girl" (Burch, Judd) – 3:59
  - parody of "Don't Take the Girl" by Tim McGraw (Craig Martin, Larry W. Johnson)
8. "We Own the World" (Burch, Judd, Sarenana) – 4:28
  - parody of "We Are the World" by USA for Africa (Michael Jackson, Lionel Richie)
9. "Shade Tree Mechanic" (Steve Clark, Larry Cordle, Larry Shell) – 2:40
  - original song
10. "Stinkin' Problem" (Judd) – 2:49
  - parody of "Thinkin' Problem" by David Ball (David Ball, Allen Shamblin, Stuart Ziff)
