= The Original Dixie Hick =

EP by Cledus T. Judd
- Released: 2003
- Genres: Country, parody
- Length: November 11, 2003
- Label: Audium/Koch
- Producers: Cledus T. Judd, Chris "P. Cream" Clark

Cledus T. Judd chronology
A Six Pack of Judd (2003)	The Original Dixie Hick (2003)	Bipolar and Proud (2004)

The Original Dixie Hick is an EP released by country music parodist Cledus T. Judd in late 2003. Tracks 1, 3, and 4 are all parodies of "Celebrity" by Brad Paisley, while track 2 is a parody of Chris Cagle's "Chicks Dig It". All four parodies were inspired by the various Dixie Chicks controversies in 2003. This was also his first album for Koch Entertainment after leaving Monument in 2003.

== Track listing ==
All parody lyrics by Cledus T. Judd; "The Chicks Did It" co-written by Chris Clark.

1. "Martie, Emily & Natalie" (Brad Paisley, Judd)
  - parody of "Celebrity" by Brad Paisley
2. "The Chicks Did It" (Judd, Chris Clark, Chris Cagle, Charlie Crowe)
  - parody of "Chicks Dig It" by Chris Cagle
3. "Natalie" (Paisley, Judd)
  - second parody of "Celebrity" by Brad Paisley
4. "Toby vs. Natalie" (Paisley, Judd)
  - third parody of "Celebrity" by Brad Paisley

== Chart performance ==
Chart (2003)	Peak position
U.S. Billboard Top Country Albums	62
U.S. Billboard Top Heatseekers	39
U.S. Billboard Top Independent Albums	28
