= Did I Shave My Back for This? =

Studio album by Cledus T. Judd
- Released: March 24, 1998
- Genres: Country, parody
- Label: Razor & Tie
- Producers: Cledus T. Judd, Chris Clark

Cledus T. Judd chronology
I Stoled This Record (1996)	Did I Shave My Back for This? (1998)	Juddmental (1999)

Professional ratings
Review scores
Source	Rating
Allmusic	link
Entertainment Weekly	B link

Did I Shave My Back for This? is the third album from country music parodist Cledus T. Judd. The title of the album itself is a take-off on Deana Carter's 1996 debut album Did I Shave My Legs for This?, whose title track is parodied here. As with his previous two albums for Razor & Tie, this album produced no chart singles for him.

== Track listing ==
1. "Wives Do It All the Time" – 2:54
  - parody of "Guys Do It All the Time" by Mindy McCready
2. "First Redneck on the Internet" – 3:41
  - original song
  - feat. Buck Owens
3. "Every Light in the House Is Blown" – 2:58
  - parody of "Every Light in the House" by Trace Adkins
4. "Third Rock from Her Thumb" – 2:54
  - parody of "Third Rock from the Sun" by Joe Diffie
5. "Mindy McCready" – 2:37
  - parody of "Little Bitty" by Alan Jackson
6. "Did I Shave My Back for This?" – 3:13
  - parody of "Did I Shave My Legs for This?" by Deana Carter
7. "Hankenstein" – 3:53
  - original song
8. "Hip Hop & Honky Tonk" – 2:44
  - original song
9. "Psychic to the Stars" – 2:52
  - original song
10. "Cledus Don't Stop Eatin' for Nuthin'" – 3:30
  - parody of "Mama Don't Get Dressed Up for Nothing" by Brooks & Dunn

== Music videos ==
- "Wives Do It All The Time", Cledus plays both the husband and wife, and has a surprise ending by Vince Gill.
- "First Redneck on the Internet", features Buck Owens on a Multi Jumbo-tron Television set.
- "Every Light in the House Is Blown", features special appearance by Trace Adkins.
- "Did I Shave My Back for This?", features an appearance by Deana Carter.

== Charts ==
=== Weekly charts ===
Chart (1998)	Peak position
US Billboard 200	181
US Top Country Albums (Billboard)	16
US Heatseekers Albums (Billboard)	11

=== Year-end charts ===
Chart (1998)	Position
US Top Country Albums (Billboard)	71
