= Just Another Day in Parodies =

Studio album by Cledus T. Judd
- Released: November 14, 2000
- Genres: Country, parody
- Label: Monument
- Producers: Cledus T. Judd; Chris "P. Cream" Clark

Cledus T. Judd chronology
| Juddmental (1999) | Just Another Day in Parodies (2000) | Cledus Envy (2002) |

Professional ratings
Review scores
| Source | Rating |
|---|---|
| Allmusic | link |

Just Another Day in Parodies is an album, released in 2000, from country music parodist Cledus T. Judd. It was his first album for Monument Records after parting ways with Razor & Tie. Although the album's title is a take-off on Phil Vassar's "Just Another Day in Paradise", Judd's parody of that song is not included on this album, but was included on his next album, Cledus Envy.

The track "More Beaver" features Brad Paisley on lead guitar.

== Track listing ==
All parody lyrics written by Cledus T. Judd and Chris Clark, except where noted.

1. "My Cellmate Thinks I'm Sexy"
  - parody of "She Thinks My Tractor's Sexy" by Kenny Chesney (Paul Overstreet, Jim Collins)
2. "Goodbye Squirrel"
  - parody of "Goodbye Earl" by the Dixie Chicks (Dennis Linde)
3. "What the *$@# Did You Say"
  - parody of "Whatever You Say" by Martina McBride (Ed Hill, Tony Martin)
4. "More Beaver" (Judd, Clark, Darin Gardner)
  - parody of "Me Neither" by Brad Paisley (Brad Paisley, Frank Rogers, Chris DuBois)
5. "The Record Deal" (Judd, Clark, Lewis Anderson)
  - original song
6. "How Do You Milk a Cow"
  - parody of "How Do You Like Me Now?!" by Toby Keith (Toby Keith, Chuck Cannon)
7. "A Night I Can't Remember" (Judd, Clark, Jeff Carter)
  - parody of "A Night to Remember" by Joe Diffie (Max T. Barnes, T.W. Hale)
8. "Momma's Boy" (Judd, Clark)
  - original song
  - feat. John Anderson
9. "Wife Naggin'"
  - parody of "Sin Wagon" by the Dixie Chicks (Natalie Maines, Emily Robison, Stephony Smith)
10. "Plowboy"
  - parody of "Cowboy" by Kid Rock (Kid Rock, John Travis, Uncle Kracker, James K. Trombly)
11. "Merry Christmas from the Whole Fam Damily" (Judd, Clark)
  - original song

== Personnel ==
Compiled from liner notes.

- Trenna Barnes — background vocals
- Mike Brignardello — bass guitar
- Gary Burnette — acoustic guitar, six-string banjo
- Chris Clark — background vocals
- Harrell Cook — bass guitar
- J. T. Corenflos — electric guitar
- Joanna Cotten — background vocals
- Stephen Davenport — acoustic guitar, six-string banjo, fiddle, mandolin
- Dan Dugmore — steel guitar
- Glen Duncan — fiddle, mandolin
- Howard Hall — electric guitar
- Wes Hightower — background vocals
- Troy Lancaster — electric guitar
- Buffy Lawson — background vocals
- Russ Pahl — steel guitar, Dobro, electric guitar, banjo
- Larry Paxton — bass guitar, tuba
- Alison Prestwood — bass guitar
- Paul Scholten — drums
- John Singer — drums
- Gary Smith — piano, organ
- Michael Spriggs — acoustic guitar, six-string banjo
- H.L. Voelker — background vocals

Additional background vocals on "Merry Christmas from the Whole Fam Damily" by Melissa Bell, Meredith Bell, Hilary Radcliff and Maddie Radcliff.

== Charts ==
=== Weekly charts ===
| Chart (2000) | Peak position |
|---|---|
| US Billboard 200 | 198 |
| US Top Country Albums (Billboard) | 25 |
| US Heatseekers Albums (Billboard) | 7 |

=== Year-end charts ===
| Chart (2001) | Position |
|---|---|
| US Top Country Albums (Billboard) | 52 |
