= I Stoled This Record =

Studio album by Cledus T. Judd
- Released: May 21, 1996
- Genres: Country, parody
- Label: Razor & Tie
- Producer: Cledus T. Judd

Cledus T. Judd chronology
Cledus T. Judd (No Relation) (1995)	I Stoled This Record (1996)	Did I Shave My Back for This? (1998)

Professional ratings
Review scores
Source	Rating
Allmusic	link

I Stoled This Record is the second album from country music parodist Cledus T. Judd. His highest-selling album to date, it has been certified gold in the United States, although none of its singles charted. As with his previous album, this one features parodies of several country songs (and a parody of "Grandma Got Run Over by a Reindeer"), as well as some original tunes.

== Track listing ==
1. "Cledus Busted!" — 0:11
  - track consists of a jail door slamming
2. "If Shania Was Mine" (parody lyrics by Judd, Chris Clark) — 3:12
  - parody of "Any Man of Mine" by Shania Twain (Shania Twain, Robert John "Mutt" Lange)
3. "(She's Got a Butt) Bigger Than the Beatles" (parody lyrics by Judd, Billy Lawson, Gary Burnett) — 3:30
  - parody of "Bigger Than the Beatles" by Joe Diffie (Jeb Anderson, Steve Dukes)
4. "The Change" (parody lyrics by Judd, Clark) — 3:06
  - parody of "For a Change" by Neal McCoy (Steve Seskin, John Scott Sherrill)
5. "Skoal: The Grundy County Spitting Incident" (parody lyrics by Judd, Clark) — 2:24
  - parody of "Sold (The Grundy County Auction Incident)" by John Michael Montgomery (Robb Royer, Richard Fagan)
6. "Jackson (Alan That Is)" (parody lyrics by Judd, Vern Dant) — 3:02
  - parody of "Jackson" by Johnny Cash and June Carter Cash (Billy Edd Wheeler, Jerry Leiber)
7. "You Have No Right to Remain Violent" (parody lyrics by Judd, Clark) — 3:18
  - parody of "You Have the Right to Remain Silent" by Perfect Stranger (Brenda Sweat, Cal Sweat)
8. "Cadirac Style" (parody lyrics by Judd, Lawson, Mike Curtis) — 3:04
  - parody of "Cadillac Style" by Sammy Kershaw (Mark C. Petersen)
9. "Quit Teasin' Me Ed" (Judd, Dant) — 3:05
  - original song
10. "I'm Not in Here for Love (Just Yer Beer)" (parody lyrics by Judd, Clark) — 3:34
  - parody of "(If You're Not in It for Love) I'm Outta Here!" by Shania Twain (Twain, Lange)
11. "Cledus Went Down to Florida" (parody lyrics by Judd, Clark) — 3:19
  - parody of "The Devil Went Down to Georgia" by the Charlie Daniels Band (Charlie Daniels, Tom Crain, Joel DiGregorio, Fred Edwards, Charles Hayward, James W. Marshall)
12. "1-900-Sheila" (Judd, Dant, Bruce Burch) — 3:06
  - original song
13. "Stoled: The Copyright Infringement Incident" (parody lyrics by Judd, Burch, Dan Saranana, Fagan) — 2:21
  - second parody of "Sold (The Grundy County Auction Incident)" by John Michael Montgomery
14. "Grandpa Got Runned [sic] Over By a John Deere" (parody lyrics by Judd, Burch) — 3:14
  - parody of "Grandma Got Run Over by a Reindeer" by Elmo and Patsy (Randy Brooks)

== Personnel ==
- Michael Black - background vocals
- Walt Cunningham - piano
- Glen Duncan - fiddle
- Hoot Hester - fiddle
- Cledus T. Judd - vocals, harmonica
- Jerry Kimbrough - electric guitar
- Scott Q. Merry - bass guitar
- Paul Scholten - drums
- Mike Seavers - electric guitar
- Michael Spriggs - acoustic guitar
- Kim Winters - background vocals

== Chart performance ==
Chart (1996)	Peak position
U.S. Billboard Top Country Albums	23
U.S. Billboard 200	173
U.S. Billboard Top Heatseekers	8
