= Celebrity (Brad Paisley song) =

Single by Brad Paisley

from the album Mud on the Tires
- Released: March 17, 2003
- Recorded: 2003
- Genre: Country
- Length: 3:45
- Label: Arista Nashville
- Songwriter: Brad Paisley
- Producer: Frank Rogers

Brad Paisley singles chronology
"I Wish You'd Stay" (2002)	"Celebrity" (2003)	"Little Moments" (2003)

"Celebrity" is a song written and recorded by American country music singer Brad Paisley. It was released in March 2003 as the lead single from his album, Mud on the Tires. The song reached the top five of the Billboard Hot Country Songs chart, peaking at number three. It also peaked at number 31 on the U.S. Billboard Hot 100.

== Content ==
The song displays a humorous perspective on show business and the many problems that current entertainers endure, along with the notion that anyone can be famous as a result of reality television programs.

== Music video ==
The song's music video begins with a parody of the Fox TV series American Idol, which aired from 2002 to 2016, and the parody is called "Celebrity Icon", in which William Shatner plays a Simon Cowell style judge who becomes very critical of Paisley during his performance. The video features various parodies of reality TV shows, such as a parody of Fear Factor, which is called "Scare Tactic", in which Paisley is eating a plate of earthworms; a parody of The Bachelor, where Trista Rehn chooses the late Little Jimmy Dickens over Paisley as her match; and a sitcom called "The Brad Paisley Show", where Jim Belushi makes a cameo appearance. Scenes also included Paisley driving his car, a Ferrari.

The video also parodies specific tabloid targets, such as Michael Jackson. In one instance, Paisley is wearing a surgical mask as Jackson was known to do walking down the street with two masked children, played by Taylor Atelian along with co-star Billi Bruno from According to Jim, similar to the scene in the Martin Bashir documentary Living with Michael Jackson. The video also has an appearance by Jason Alexander, who plays George Costanza on the long-running NBC sitcom Seinfeld, in which he appears as himself at a Starbucks (actually filmed at The Coffee Fix in Studio City), who steals a pastry and makes a scene with the coffee shop manager and employee over a "mocha soy latte". The last scene of the video shows Paisley stopping his car, where a man (Shatner) in the sunglasses comes in, claims it his car, and he asks Paisley about getting into the second gear. And then, Paisley finishes his song, where Shatner tells him that his performance was horrible, and how he (Shatner) enjoys when the song is over; a dejected Paisley then walks off the stage.

The music video was directed by Peter Zavadil and premiered on April 10, 2003 on CMT. It was filmed over a period of 5 days in LA and Studio City, CA.

== Personnel ==
- Randle Currie - steel guitar
- Eric Darken - percussion
- Kevin "Swine" Grantt - bass guitar
- Wes Hightower - background vocals
- Brad Paisley - lead vocals, electric guitar, acoustic guitar, 12 string guitar, Tic tac bass, mandolin
- Ben Sesar - drums
- Justin Williamson - fiddle

== Chart performance ==
"Celebrity" debuted at number 56 on the U.S. Billboard Hot Country Singles & Tracks for the week of March 22, 2003. "Celebrity" spent twenty-nine weeks on the Billboard country singles charts, reaching a peak of number 3 in the middle of the year and holding that position for four weeks.

Chart (2003)	Peak position
US Billboard Hot 100	31
US Hot Country Songs (Billboard)	3

=== Year-end charts ===
Chart (2003)	Position
US Country Songs (Billboard)	10

== In popular culture ==
The song appears on the game Karaoke Revolution Country.

The song was performed by Blake Shelton and The Swon Brothers on the finale of NBC's The Voice in 2013.

Parodies

American parody artist Cledus T. Judd released 3 parodies of "Celebrity" titled "Martie, Emily & Natalie", "Natalie", and "Toby vs. Natalie" on his 2003 album The Original Dixie Hick.
