= Yes! (Chad Brock song) =

Single by Chad Brock

from the album Yes!
- B-side: "Tell Me Your Secret"
- Released: February 21, 2000
- Recorded: 1999
- Genre: Country rock
- Length: 3:24
- Label: Warner Bros. Nashville
- Songwriters: Stephony Smith; Jim Collins; Chad Brock
- Producers: Buddy Cannon; Norro Wilson

Chad Brock singles chronology
"A Country Boy Can Survive (Y2K Version)" (1999)	"Yes!" (2000)	"The Visit" (2000)

Alternative cover
- CD cover

"Yes!" is a song co-written and recorded by American country music artist Chad Brock. It was released in February 2000 as the second single and title from his album of the same name. The song reached the top of the Billboard Hot Country Singles & Tracks chart. It is considered to be Brock's signature song and his only number-one single, spending three weeks at No. 1 in the U.S., and one week in Canada. Brock wrote this song with Stephony Smith and Jim Collins.

== Critical reception ==
Deborah Evans Price, of Billboard magazine reviewed the song favorably, saying that the song "boasts a buoyant melody and positive lyric that captures all the excitement and emotional energy of a burgeoning relationship." She went on to call the chorus "absolutely infectious" and "one of those sing-along refrains that makes for a great radio song." On Brock's vocals she says that he has a "personable, Everyman kind of quality to his voice that makes this tune readily relatable."

== Music video ==
The music video for this song was directed by Gerry Wenner, and shows Brock on a beach where white people of many ages, in various stages of relationships, are having conversations with their partners.

== Chart performance ==
"Yes!" debuted at number 52 on the Hot Country Singles & Tracks chart the week of February 26, 2000, and climbed to Number One on the week of June 17, 2000, where it held for three consecutive weeks, also giving Brock his only Number One single. It also peaked at number 22 on the Billboard Hot 100.

=== Peak positions ===
Chart (2000)	Peak position
Canada Country Singles (RPM)	1
US Billboard Hot 100	22
US Hot Country Songs (Billboard)	1

=== Year-end charts ===
Chart (2000)	Position
US Country Songs (Billboard)	2
US Hot 100 (Billboard)	79

== Parodies ==
- Country music parodist Cledus T. Judd parodied this song on his CD, Cledus Envy, as "1/2."
