= A Six Pack of Judd =

A Six Pack Of Judd

EP by Cledus T. Judd
- Released: April 29, 2003
- Genres: Country, parody
- Label: Monument
- Producers: Cledus T. Judd, Chris "P. Cream" Clark

Cledus T. Judd chronology
Cledus Navidad (2002)	A Six Pack Of Judd (2003)	The Original Dixie Hick (2003)

Professional ratings
Review scores
Source	Rating
Allmusic	link

A Six Pack of Judd is a six-song EP compact disc recorded by country music parodist Cledus T. Judd. It was released in 2003 on Monument Records Nashville.

The beer can depicted on the album cover gives a nod to Budweiser's "Born on Date" concept, using the album's release date ("29 APR 2003").

== Track listing ==
1. "Where's Your Mommy?"
  - parody of "Who's Your Daddy?" by Toby Keith
2. "I Was Country When Country Wasn't Pop"
  - parody of "I Was Country When Country Wasn't Cool" by Barbara Mandrell and George Jones
  - feat. George Jones
3. "My Crowd"
  - parody of "My Town" by Montgomery Gentry
4. "270 Somethin'"
  - parody of "19 Somethin'" by Mark Wills
5. "Riding with Inmate Jerome"
  - parody of "Riding with Private Malone" by David Ball
6. "New Car"
  - parody of "Big Star" by Kenny Chesney

== Chart performance ==
Chart (2003)	Peak position
U.S. Billboard Top Country Albums	19
U.S. Billboard 200	130
