= Polyrically Uncorrect =

Studio album by Cledus T. Judd
- Released: June 30, 2009
- Genre: Country
- Label: E1 Music
- Producers: Chris Clark, Cledus T. Judd

Cledus T. Judd chronology
| Boogity, Boogity (2007) | Polyrically Uncorrect (2009) | Parodyziac!! (2012) |

Polyrically Uncorrect is the tenth studio album, and fourteenth album release overall, by American country music parodist Cledus T. Judd. It was released on June 30, 2009 via E1 Music. It includes the singles "Waitin' on Obama", "Garth Must Be Busy" and "(If I Had) Kellie Pickler's Boobs". The album includes guest vocals from Ashton Shepherd, Ronnie Dunn, Jamey Johnson, Terry Eldredge (of The Grascals), Colt Ford and Daryle Singletary. Chris Neal of Country Weekly gave the album three stars out of five, citing the Ronnie Dunn collaboration as a standout track.

== Track listing ==
1. "Polyrically Uncorrect" – 3:23
  - duet with Ashton Shepherd
  - parody of "Politically Uncorrect" by Gretchen Wilson and Merle Haggard
2. "Garth Must Be Busy" – 4:00
  - duet with Ronnie Dunn
  - parody of "God Must Be Busy" by Brooks & Dunn
3. "(If I Had) Kellie Pickler's Boobs" – 2:51
  - featuring Terry Eldredge (of The Grascals) and Jamey Johnson
4. "Waitin' on Obama" – 3:44
  - parody of "Waitin' on a Woman" by Brad Paisley
5. "Cooter" – 3:13 a tribute song to the mechanic of The Dukes Of Hazzard tv show
6. "Washing Airplanes" – 3:56
  - parody of "Watching Airplanes" by Gary Allan
7. "Tailgatin'" – 3:09
  - duet with Colt Ford
8. "Hard Time" – 3:15
  - parody of "Good Time" by Alan Jackson
9. "Merger on Music Row" – 4:24
  - duet with Daryle Singletary
  - parody of "Murder on Music Row" by George Strait and Alan Jackson
10. "Dang It, I'm Vixen" – 3:13
11. "Christmas in Rehab" – 3:04

== Personnel ==
- Steve Brewster – drums
- Ricky Cobble – engineer, mixing
- Kevin "Swine" Grantt – bass guitar
- Paul Grosso – design, creative director
- Rob Hajacos – fiddle
- Wes Hightower – background vocals
- Jeff King – electric guitar
- Matt Legge – assistant engineer
- Randy LeRoy – mastering
- Steve Marcantonio – mixing
- Gary Prim – piano
- Chuck Rhodes – executive producer
- John B. Sparks – assistant engineer
- Bryan Sutton – acoustic guitar

== Chart performance ==
=== Album ===
| Chart (2009) | Peak position |
|---|---|
| U.S. Billboard Top Comedy Albums | 7 |
| U.S. Billboard Top Country Albums | 56 |

=== Singles ===
| Year | Single | Peak positions |
| Year | Single | US Country |
|---|---|---|
| 2009 | "Waitin' On Obama" | — |
| 2009 | "Garth Must Be Busy" (with Brooks & Dunn) | — |
| 2009 | "(If I Had) Kellie Pickler's Boobs" | — |
| 2009 | "Christmas in Rehab" | — |
"—" denotes releases that did not chart
