= Bipolar and Proud =

Studio album by Cledus T. Judd
- Released: August 24, 2004
- Genres: Country, parody
- Label: Audium/Koch
- Producer: Cledus T. Judd; Chris "P. Cream" Clark

Cledus T. Judd chronology
The Original Dixie Hick (2003)	Bipolar and Proud (2004)	Boogity, Boogity – A Tribute to the Comedic Genius of Ray Stevens (2007)

Bipolar and Proud is a 2004 album released by country music parodist Cledus T. Judd. The album was originally slated to be named "Cledus Gone Wild", but was changed at the last minute. This album also produced his highest chart single in "I Love NASCAR", which charted at 48 on the Hot Country Songs charts.

David Jefferies of Allmusic rated the album three-and-a-half stars out of five, saying that most of the tracks were funny, but criticizing "____ Is Funny".

It is also an enhanced CD, featuring the video for the song "I Love NASCAR".

== Track listing ==
Original content on parody songs written by Cledus T. Judd and Chris Clark, except "Bake Me a Country Ham", parody lyrics by Corey Lee Barker and Lee Gibson. Composers of original songs as noted.

1. "I Love NASCAR" — 4:07
  - parody of "I Love This Bar" by Toby Keith (Toby Keith, Scotty Emerick)
  - feat. Toby Keith
2. "Hell No" — 4:22
  - parody of "Hell Yeah" by Montgomery Gentry (Jeffrey Steele, Craig Wiseman)
3. "One Jack Off" (Judd, Clark, Paula Taylor) — 3:41
  - original song
4. "Paycheck Woman" — 3:21
  - parody of "Redneck Woman" by Gretchen Wilson (Gretchen Wilson, John Rich)
5. "Bake Me a Country Ham" — 3:44
  - parody of "Paint Me a Birmingham" by Tracy Lawrence (Buck Moore, Gary Duffy)
6. "I'm Going Ugly Early Tonight" (Brent Burns, Bill Whyte, Pete Hourihan) — 3:03
  - original song
7. "____ Is Funny" (Jim Beavers, Mike Waldron) — 3:20
  - original song
8. "Starkissed" (Keith, Emerick) — 2:55
  - original song
9. "Martie, Emily & Natalie" — 3:31
  - parody of "Celebrity" by Brad Paisley (Brad Paisley)
10. "Funny Man" (Clark) — 4:04
  - original song

== Personnel ==
Compiled from liner notes.

- Ricky Barker — background vocals on "I'm Going Ugly Early Tonight"
- Jim Beavers — background vocals on "____ Is Funny"
- Trenna Barnes — background vocals on "Paycheck Woman" and "One Jack Off"
- Dennis Burnside — keyboards on "Hell No" and "Funnyman"
- Glen Duncan — fiddle, mandolin
- Pat Flynn — acoustic guitar
- Wes Hightower — background vocals on "I Love NASCAR" and "Hell No"
- Doug Kahan — bass guitar
- Troy Lancaster — electric guitar
- Russ Pahl — electric guitar, pedal steel guitar
- Larry Paxton — bass guitar
- Marcia Ramirez — background vocals on "____ Is Funny"
- John Wesley Ryles — background vocals on "One Jack Off", "Bake Me a Country Ham", "I'm Going Ugly Early Tonight", "Starkissed" and "Funnyman"
- Scott Sanders — pedal steel guitar, lap steel guitar
- Paul Scholten — drums, percussion
- Mike Severs — electric guitar
- Steve Sheehan — acoustic guitar
- Gary Smith — keyboards
- Mike Waldron — background vocals on "____ Is Funny"

== Charts ==
Chart (2004)	Peak position
U.S. Billboard 200	98
U.S. Billboard Top Comedy Albums	2
U.S. Billboard Top Country Albums	15
U.S. Billboard Independent Albums	8
