= Parodyziac!! =

Studio album by Cledus T. Judd
- Released: November 13, 2012
- Genres: Country, parody
- Length: 43:39
- Label: Warner Bros. Nashville
- Producers: Cledus T. Judd; Chris Clark; Rex Paul Schnelle

Cledus T. Judd chronology
Polyrically Uncorrect (2009)	Parodyziac!! (2012)

Parodyziac!! is the eleventh and final studio album by American parody musician Cledus T. Judd. The album was released on October 16, 2012 as his first for Warner Bros. Records Nashville.

== Critical reception ==
Chuck Dauphin of Music News Nashville gave the album a positive review, calling it "one of his most unique offerings yet." David Jeffries of Allmusic rated it four out of five stars, saying that it was his "funniest album in a decade."

== Track listing ==
All parody lyrics composed by Cledus T. Judd and Chris Clark, except as noted.

1. "Cledus T." — 3:50
  - parody of "Springsteen" by Eric Church (Eric Church, Jeff Hyde, Ryan Tyndell)
2. "Double D Cups" (Parody lyrics by Judd, Clark, "Big Ed") — 3:22
  - parody of "Red Solo Cup" by Toby Keith (Brett Beavers, Jim Beavers, Brad Warren, Brett Warren)
3. "Feel Like a Pawn Star" — 3:33
  - parody of "Feel Like a Rock Star" by Kenny Chesney with Tim McGraw (Rodney Clawson, Chris Tompkins)
  - duet with Rodney Carrington
4. "A Little More Hungry Than That" (parody lyrics by Joshua R. Roland, Michael Blake Wilkey) — 3:10
  - parody of "A Little More Country Than That" by Easton Corbin (Rory Lee Feek, Wynn Varble, Don Poythress)
5. "Honeymoon" — 3:29
  - parody of "Pontoon" by Little Big Town (Luke Laird, Barry Dean, Natalie Hemby)
6. "Tebow" (parody lyrics by Judd, Clark, Orlando Davis) — 3:49
  - parody of "Banjo" by Rascal Flatts (Tony Martin, Neil Thrasher, Wendell Mobley)
7. "Redneck Pool" (Clark) — 3:57
  - original song
8. "Tweetin'" — 3:50
  - parody of "Creepin'" by Eric Church (Church, Marv Green)
9. "Living Single in a Double Wide" (Judd, Joel Shewmake) — 3:13
10. "The House That Broke Me" — 4:09
  - parody of "The House That Built Me" by Miranda Lambert (Tom Douglas, Allen Shamblin)
11. "If This Is Country Music" (parody lyrics by Judd, Jimmy Melton) — 3:43
  - parody of "This Is Country Music" by Brad Paisley (Brad Paisley, Chris DuBois)
12. "104 Amanda Street" (Judd, Shane Minor, Jennifer Hicks) — 3:34
  - original song

== Production ==
- Cledus T. Judd and Chris Clark (all tracks except 5, 8, 12)
- Cledus T. Judd, Chris Clark, Rex Paul Schnelle (tracks 5, 8)
- Cledus T. Judd, Rex Paul Schnelle (track 12)

== Chart performance ==
Chart (2012)	Peak position
US Billboard Top Comedy Albums	14
