= I Love This Bar =

Single by Toby Keith

from the album Shock'n Y'all
- B-side: "I Love This Bar" (album version)
- Released: August 18, 2003
- Recorded: 2003
- Genre: Country
- Length: 5:35 (album version); 4:02 (single version)
- Label: DreamWorks Nashville
- Songwriters: Toby Keith; Scotty Emerick
- Producers: Toby Keith; James Stroud

Toby Keith singles chronology
"Beer for My Horses" (2003)	"I Love This Bar" (2003)	"American Soldier" (2003)

"I Love This Bar" is a song co-written and recorded by American country music artist Toby Keith. It was released in August 2003 as the first single from his 2003 album Shock'n Y'all. The song reached number one on the US Billboard Hot Country Singles & Tracks chart, keeping the top spot for five weeks. Keith wrote this song with Scotty Emerick.

The song's title inspired a chain of restaurants owned by Keith named Toby Keith's I Love This Bar & Grill.

== Content ==
The narrator describes his favorite bar and the people who frequent it.

== Critical reception ==
Ray Waddell, of Billboard magazine reviewed the song favorably, calling it a "beer-joint staple for years to come.""

In 2014, Rolling Stone ranked the song at #98 on its 200 Greatest Country Songs of All Time ranking.

== Music video ==
The video for this song was filmed at a bar in Chatsworth, California called The Cowboy Palace Saloon. It was directed by Michael Salomon, and premiered on CMT on August 21, 2003.

== Chart performance ==
"I Love This Bar" debuted at number 30 on the U.S. Billboard Hot Country Singles & Tracks for the week of August 30, 2003. The song has sold 1,033,000 copies in the U.S. as of April 2014.

Chart (2003)	Peak position
US Hot Country Songs (Billboard)	1
US Billboard Hot 100	26

=== Year-end charts ===
Chart (2003)	Position
US Country Songs (Billboard)	44

Chart (2004)	Position
US Country Songs (Billboard)	52

== Certifications ==
Region	Certification	Certified units/sales
United States (RIAA)	3× Platinum	3,000,000^{‡}
^{‡} Sales+streaming figures based on certification alone.

== Covers ==
In 2006, this song was covered by Sammy Hagar for his album Livin' It Up!.

== "I Love NASCAR" ==
On his 2004 album Bipolar and Proud, country music parodist Cledus T. Judd recorded a parody titled "I Love NASCAR". This parody peaked at number 48 on the Billboard Hot Country Singles & Tracks charts. Although the song featured a guest vocal from Keith, he did not receive chart credit for it.

Chart (2004)	Peak position
U.S. Billboard Hot Country Singles & Tracks	48
