= Lightning Does the Work =

Single by Chad Brock

from the album Chad Brock
- B-side: "Evangeline"
- Released: March 2, 1999
- Genre: Country
- Length: 3:46
- Label: Warner Bros. Nashville
- Songwriters: Chad Brock, John Hadley, Kelly Garrett
- Producers: Buddy Cannon, Norro Wilson

Chad Brock singles chronology
"Ordinary Life" (1998)	"Lightning Does the Work" (1999)	"A Country Boy Can Survive (Y2K version)" (1999)

"Lightning Does the Work" is a song by American country music artist Chad Brock. It was released in March 1999 as the third and final single from his self-titled debut album. The song reached No. 19 on the Billboard Hot Country Singles & Tracks chart. It was written by Brock, John Hadley and Kelly Garrett.

== Music video ==
The music video was directed by Guy Guillet, and premiered in March 1999. It features Brock wearing a ball cap, as he uses a tool to make the metal in his barn for the lightning, and driving a pickup truck. Scenes also feature him singing the song in a dark room full of blue smoke. During the instrumental break, Brock puts his goggles on as he watches the lightning kick into the back of the truck, and driving his pickup truck again. He stands outside, and the video ends.

== Chart performance ==
Chart (1999)	Peak position
Canada Country Singles (RPM)	21
US Billboard Hot 100	86
US Hot Country Songs (Billboard)	19

=== Year-end charts ===
Chart (1999)	Position
US Country Songs (Billboard)	69
