= Chad Brock =

American country singer (born 1963)

- Born: July 31, 1963 (age 63)
- Origin: Ocala, Florida, U.S.
- Genre: Country
- Occupation: Singer-songwriter
- Years active: 1998–Present
- Labels: Warner Bros. Nashville; Broken Bow; Rocky Comfort; Straight Shooter

Chad Brock (born July 31, 1963) is an American country music singer. Before beginning his musical career in the late 1990s, he was a professional wrestler in World Championship Wrestling (WCW), until an injury forced him to retire.

Brock signed to Warner Bros. Records' Nashville division in the late 1990s, releasing three studio albums – 1998's Chad Brock, 2000's Yes!, and 2001's III — for WB. Those albums, overall, produced seven singles on the Billboard country music charts, including the number-one hit "Yes!" and the Top Five "Ordinary Life". Brock parted company with Warner Bros. in 2002, and signed to Broken Bow Records a year later; although he released five singles for them (of which four charted), his album for Broken Bow was not released, and he left that label as well.

Brock also began a career in the late 2000s as a disc jockey at WQYK-FM in Tampa, Florida, where he and parody singer Cledus T. Judd co-hosted a morning show.

== Biography ==
Chad Brock was born July 31, 1963, in Ocala, Florida. In high school, Brock played football and was offered a post-secondary scholarship to play sports. He turned down the scholarship, however, as his experiences in the school choir had convinced him to pursue a singing career. Brock moved to Nashville, Tennessee, to follow this dream, but he met with little success at first. In 1994, he signed a record deal with Warner Bros. Records, but he did not release any music for over three years.

=== Professional wrestling career ===
Warner Brothers and WCW got together to cross-promote Brock, and he trained at World Championship Wrestling's training facility, the WCW Power Plant. Chad wrestled for WCW from 1994 to 1996, until an injury forced him to retire. He also appeared at several WCW events in 1999, where he was briefly involved in an angle with Curt Hennig.

=== Musical career ===
In 1998, Brock released his debut single, "Evangeline", which peaked at number 51 on the Billboard Hot Country Singles & Tracks (now Hot Country Songs) charts. That song's follow-up, the ballad "Ordinary Life", became Brock's first major hit, peaking at number 3 on the same chart, as well as number 39 on the Billboard Hot 100. Following that song's success, Brock released his self-titled debut album. Its third and final single, "Lightning Does The Work", reached number 19 in 1999.

Brock's fourth chart single was a rewrite of Hank Williams, Jr.'s signature song "A Country Boy Can Survive", a number 2 hit for Williams in 1981. Chad's version, which featured Williams and George Jones, was entitled "A Country Boy Can Survive (Y2K Version)", was re-written with lyrics pertaining to the Year 2000 problem (abbreviated Y2K). The song served as the first single from Brock's 2000 album Yes!. Its second single was the title track, which went on to become Brock's only number-one Billboard hit, as well as a number 22 hit on the Hot 100 chart. The third and last single from Yes! ("The Visit") peaked at number 21.

2001 saw the release of Brock's third and final album for Warner Bros.. Entitled III, it was less successful than its predecessor. III had only one chart entry in "Tell Me How", which failed to make the Top 40. This album also reprised Brock's three highest-charting singles ("Yes!", "Ordinary Life" and "Lightning Does The Work"). Shortly thereafter, he signed to Broken Bow Records, then a newly formed independent label. Although he released five singles for Broken Bow, four of which made the charts, he never put out a full album.

Brock left Nashville in 2005 to co-host a morning show on the Tampa, Florida, station WQYK-FM along with country music parodist Cledus T. Judd. He remained on the morning show on WQYK-FM, while Cletus moved on to the Bull in Atlanta. In 2007, Brock signed with Rocky Comfort Records, a label which was started by Tracy Lawrence, although he did not release anything for the label. His first single in four years, "Put A Redneck In The White House", was released in August 2008 on the Straight Shooter label. In February 2010, Brock left WQYK-FM to begin his new position as Director of Programming for the new cable channel The Country Network but left TCN in early 2011.

== Discography ==
=== Studio albums ===
| Title | Album details | Peak chart positions | | | |
| Title | Album details | US Country | US | US Heat | CAN Country |
|---|---|---|---|---|---|
| Chad Brock | Release date: October 20, 1998; Label: Warner Nashville | 37 | — | 31 | — |
| Yes! | Release date: May 2, 2000; Label: Warner Nashville | 17 | 125 | 3 | 21 |
| III | Release date: September 25, 2001; Label: Warner Nashville | 44 | — | — | — |
"—" denotes releases that did not chart

=== Singles ===
| Year | Single | Peak chart positions | | | Album |
| Year | Single | US Country | US | CAN Country | Album |
|---|---|---|---|---|---|
| 1998 | "Evangeline" | 51 | — | — | Chad Brock |
| 1998 | "Ordinary Life" | 3 | 39 | 10 | Chad Brock |
| 1999 | "Lightning Does the Work" | 19 | 86 | 21 | Chad Brock |
| 1999 | "A Country Boy Can Survive (Y2K version)" (with Hank Williams, Jr. and George Jones) | 30 | 75 | 66 | Yes! |
| 2000 | "Yes!" | 1 | 22 | 1 | Yes! |
| 2000 | "No One" (with Shirley Myers) | — | — | 35 | New Country 7 |
| 2000 | "The Visit" | 21 | — (Note: "The Visit" did not enter the Hot 100, but peaked at number 8 on Bubbling Under Hot 100 Singles, which acts as a 25-song extension of the Hot 100.) | — | Yes! |
| 2001 | "Tell Me How" | 47 | — | — | III |
| 2002 | "A Man's Gotta Do" | 60 | — | — | Non-album singles |
| 2003 | "That Was Us" | 58 | — | — | Non-album singles |
| 2003 | "It's a Woman Thing" | — | — | — | Non-album singles |
| 2004 | "You Are" | 48 | — | — | Non-album singles |
| 2004 | "That Changed Me" | 53 | — | — | Non-album singles |
| 2008 | "Put a Redneck in the White House" | — | — | — | Non-album singles |
"—" denotes releases that did not chart

=== Music videos ===
| Year | Video | Director |
|---|---|---|
| 1998 | "Ordinary Life" | R. Brad Murano |
| 1999 | "Lightning Does the Work" | Guy Guillet |
| 2000 | "Yes!" | Gerry Wenner |
| 2008 | "Put a Redneck in the White House" | |

== Awards and nominations ==
| Year | Organization | Award | Nominee/Work | Result |
|---|---|---|---|---|
| 2000 | Academy of Country Music Awards | Top New Male Vocalist | Chad Brock | Nominated |
| 2000 | Academy of Country Music Awards | Vocal Event of the Year | "A Country Boy Can Survive" with George Jones and Hank Williams Jr. | Nominated |
