= Boogity, Boogity: A Tribute to the Comedic Genius of Ray Stevens =

Boogity, Boogity: A Tribute to the Comic Genius of Ray Stevens

Studio album by Cledus T. Judd
- Released: August 28, 2007
- Genre: Country
- Label: Asylum-Curb
- Producers: Chris Clark, Cledus T. Judd

Cledus T. Judd chronology
Bipolar and Proud (2004)	Boogity, Boogity: A Tribute to the Comic Genius of Ray Stevens (2007)	Polyrically Uncorrect (2009)

Alternative cover

Professional ratings
Review scores
Source	Rating
Allmusic -	2.5/5 stars

Boogity, Boogity: A Tribute to the Comic Genius of Ray Stevens is a tribute album recorded by country music singer/parodist Cledus T. Judd. It contains Judd's renditions of twelve songs previously recorded by country music artist Ray Stevens, largely with duet partners. Stevens himself is featured on the cover of "The Streak". "Gitarzan", featuring former Trick Pony lead vocalist Heidi Newfield, was the only single released from this project.

== History ==
The album was originally slated for release on Koch Records on October 4, 2005. However, Koch closed its Nashville division, and the album was ultimately issued by Asylum-Curb Records on August 28, 2007.

== Track listing ==
#	Title	Writer(s)	Time	Guest(s)
1	"Turn Your Radio On"	Albert E. Brumley	2:47	Lee Brice
2	"The Streak"	Ray Stevens	3:12	Ray Stevens
3	"Jeremiah Peabody's Polyunsaturated Quick-Dissolving Fast-Acting Pleasant-Tasting Green and Purple Pills"	Ray Stevens	2:37	N/A
4	"It's Me Again Margaret"	Paul Craft	3:33	Trace Adkins
5	"Gitarzan"	Ray Stevens, Bill Everette	3:40	Heidi Newfield
6	"Mississippi Squirrel Revival"	Carl Kalb, Jr.	4:12	Tyler Dean
7	"Ahab the Arab"	Ray Stevens	3:55	Phil Vassar
8	"Shriner's Convention"	Ray Stevens	5:40	Charlie Daniels
9	"Misty"	Johnny Burke, Erroll Garner	3:03	Vince Gill and Sonya Isaacs
10	"Harry the Hairy Ape"	Ray Stevens	2:57	N/A
11	"Would Jesus Wear a Rolex"	Margaret Archer, Chet Atkins	2:45	Joe Diffie
12	"Everything Is Beautiful"	Ray Stevens	4:07	Various (see personnel)

== Personnel ==
- Robert Bailey – background vocals
- Bruce Bouton – Dobro, steel guitar
- Mark Casstevens – banjo, harmonica
- Chris Clark – sound effects, vocal effects
- Kim Fleming – background vocals
- Rob Hajacos – fiddle
- Vicki Hampton – background vocals
- Wes Hightower – background vocals
- John Hobbs – piano
- Jim Horn – baritone saxophone, trombone, horn arrangements
- David Hungate – bass guitar
- John Barlow Jarvis – piano
- Cledus T. Judd – lead vocals, sound effects
- Paul Leim – drums
- Brent Mason – electric guitar
- Steve Patrick – trumpet
- Chuck Rhodes – whistle
- Michael Spriggs – acoustic guitar

=== Guest musicians ===
- Lead guitar on "Gitarzan": Keith Urban
- Guest vocals on "Everything Is Beautiful": Michael English, Erika Jo, Dobie Gray, Andy Griggs, Wynonna Judd, Rascal Flatts, Julie Roberts, SHeDAISY, Phil Vassar, Darryl Worley
- Children's chorus on "Everything Is Beautiful": Paul Hogan, Jacob Kinslow, Abbie Page, Sharon Shelton, Grace Sturgeon

== Chart performance ==
Chart (2007)	Peak position
U.S. Billboard Top Comedy Albums	3
U.S. Billboard Top Country Albums	47
