= Razor & Tie =

American record label and music publishing company

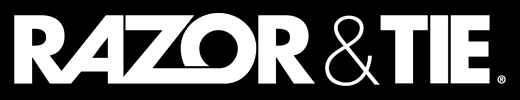
- Parent company: BMG Rights Management
- Founded: 1990; 36 years ago
- Founder: Cliff Chenfeld; Craig Balsam
- Defunct: 2018; 8 years ago
- Distributor: Universal Music Group
- Genre: Hard rock; alternative rock; heavy metal
- Country of origin: United States
- Location: New York City, U.S.
- Official website: fearlessrecords.com

Razor & Tie was an American entertainment company that consisted of a record label and a music publishing company. It was established in 1990 by Craig Balsam and Cliff Chenfeld. Based in New York City (with additional offices in Los Angeles and Nashville), Razor & Tie releases were distributed by Universal Music Group.

Razor & Tie initially focused on compilation albums and re-issues. Directly marketed through television spots, the label had early success with 70s, 80s and 90s-themed albums, beginning with Those Fabulous 70s in 1990. A retail label was launched in 1995 to release new albums from established and developing artists, including Dar Williams, Graham Parker and Marshall Crenshaw. Razor & Tie continued to expand their rock signings, and by 2016, with releases by artists including The Pretty Reckless, Starset, All That Remains and Red Sun Rising it had become a leader in the genre.

In 2001, Balsam and Chenfeld created Kidz Bop, a series of albums with young singers covering pop hits. As of 2016, Kidz Bop had sold more than 16 million albums, 22 of which debuted in the Top 10 on the Billboard charts, Kidz Bop holds the title for the most Top 10 debuts of any artist in this century. Releases on Razor & Tie have cumulatively exceeded sales of 45 million physical and digital albums, singles, videos and DVDs.

A music publishing division was founded in 2007, and in 2014 Razor & Tie launched Washington Square Records, an alternative-leaning label. In 2015 Concord Bicycle acquired an undisclosed percentage of Razor & Tie, which now operates as New Razor & Tie Enterprises LLC, a joint venture. Concord (d/b/a BMG Rights Management) fully acquired Razor & Tie on January 17, 2018. As of May 2018, Razor & Tie became an imprint of BMG Music's Fearless Records label.

== History ==
=== 1990–1995: Beginnings, compilation albums, reissues ===
Razor & Tie was founded by Craig Balsam and Cliff Chenfeld, who met while in law school at NYU. Musicians as well as music fans, they played and wrote songs together while pursuing their degrees and continued to collaborate after they had begun working as lawyers. Following several years of practicing separately at large, corporate firms, Balsam and Chenfeld began to explore the idea of releasing records from the 70s. "We really didn't enjoy practicing law as much as we enjoyed music. So we began to think about ways we could maybe change our careers," Chenfeld said in 2010. In 1990, they founded Razor & Tie, naming the company after a song they had written while working as lawyers.

In late 1990, working out of Chenfeld's apartment, Razor & Tie released their first record, Those Fabulous 70s, a compilation of AM radio hits. It was sold through a late-night television spot presented by The '70s Preservation Society, a fictitious entity that Balsam and Chenfeld had created to market the album. Through the commercial—which featured a "leisure-suited fellow with a tie so wide you could land a helicopter on it"—the album sold in excess of 100,000 copies. Those Fabulous 70s was followed by a successful series of genre-specific 70s records and 80s compilations, and in 1994 alone Razor & Tie sold more than 1 million albums. Living in the 90s, released in 1995, was the label's bestselling album of the period; its success helped to establish Razor & Tie as the largest direct response music company in the United States.

Razor & Tie's early business model also focused on reissues. With less overhead than larger record companies and an ability to focus on niche marketing, the company licensed titles from major labels which, at the time, would not have otherwise been released on CD. "It was great because we were allowed to get into a lot of music that we loved, and it was a business scale that worked very well for us. At the time, if we sold twenty thousand copies of something we could make that work, and sometimes, we'd sell one hundred or two hundred and we'd make that work," Chenfeld said. The first album Razor & Tie reissued was The Up Escalator by Graham Parker and the Rumour. It was followed by a series of reissues with added bonus material and comprehensive career retrospectives from artists a wide range of artists including Glen Campbell, King Curtis, Joe Meek and Merle Haggard.

=== 1995–2000: Retail label, Dar Williams, Monsters releases ===
In 1995, with an office in Greenwich Village, Razor & Tie launched a new music division. They released new albums by established artists such as Marshall Crenshaw, Joan Baez, and Graham Parker, which allowed Razor & Tie to focus on broadening audiences rather than developing new ones. (Parker had recorded for seven major labels. "The idea of having advertisements say Graham Parker's 'minor label debut' was appealing to me," he said.)

The first new artist signed to Razor & Tie was Dar Williams, who released her debut album The Honesty Room in February 1995. A single from the album, "When I Was a Boy", received significant radio play, and the album went on to become one of the best-selling independent folk albums of the year. Williams toured with labelmate Baez, who covered one of Williams' songs. In a 1995 interview with Billboard, Williams noted the similarities in their careers. "There were parallels in choosing a less flashy label over a more flashy label," she said. "Vanguard (Baez' first label) chose to do things more pared down and acoustic, which is what the label I chose is allowing me to do." Each of Williams' first five Razor & Tie releases sold more than 100,000 albums.

Razor & Tie also had significant success with Cledus T. Judd, the "Weird Al Yankovic of Country Music". He released four albums on the label between 1995 and 1999, including I Stoled This Record, which was certified gold, and Did I Shave My Back for This? which hit the top 20 on the country music charts.

In 1997, Razor & Tie released the 2-CD set Monsters of Rock, a compilation of hits by 1980s glam metal bands. Released in December through an "appropriately over the top, tongue-in-cheek" two-minute television spot, an abbreviated version was launched at retail the following June. Before the end of the year, it had sold 150,000 copies through direct channels and was certified gold through traditional sales. Monsters of Rock was followed in 1998 by Monster Ballads, an "aerosol-enhanced" compilation. With a December TV spot and a June retail debut, it was certified platinum in early 2000.

Razor & Tie created Razor & Tie Media in 1997 to provide media buying for its own releases as well as releases from other record companies. In 1999, the label signed a distribution deal with BMG, which was transferred to Sony Music when BMG and Sony merged in 2003.

=== 2000–2010: Kidz Bop, DVD and video releases, Razor & Tie Music Publishing ===
In 2000, Balsam and Chenfeld created Kidz Bop, a series of records of kids singing pop hits that are appropriate for children. The first compilation, a two-CD set, was released in October 2001. Sixteen of the 17 Kidz Bop albums that came out over the next 10 years debuted at No. 1 on the Billboard Kids charts. In 2009, Balsam and Chenfeld decided to expand Kidz Bop by establishing Kidz Bop Kids, who perform the songs both on record and on The Kidz Bop tour. The franchise now includes a radio channel on SiriusXM.

Other successful Razor & Tie titles in the early 2000s included the DVD release of Biggie & Tupac and Darrin's Dance Grooves, a workout DVD by choreographer Darrin Henson. Available only as a video and DVD, it charted at No. 1 in its category, and "seeped into the mainstream culture". It ultimately surpassed 1.5 million in sales. 2003's Deja Entendu by Brand New, signed through a joint venture with Triple Crown Records, was certified gold; one of Rolling Stone's "Top 40 Emo Records of All Time", it "redefined the genre".

By the end of the decade, Razor & Tie had begun phasing out the compilation albums and was primarily focused on new albums by established and developing artists. Through a label deal with Prosthetic, they signed All That Remains, whose six Razor & Tie albums had cumulative sales of more than 1 million.

In 2005, Razor & Tie began distributing the releases of Sh-K- Boom/Ghostlight Records, the Broadway cast recording label. Best-selling releases from Sh-K- Boom/Ghostlight have included the original cast recordings of Book of Mormon, Beautiful, In The Heights, Next To Normal, and Legally Blonde.

In 2007, the company founded Razor & Tie Music Publishing (RTMP). Self-administered in North America, it was aligned with a global team of sub-publishers throughout the rest of the world.

=== 2010–present: Rock dominance, Concord Bicycle Music Group, Washington Square Records, RTMP #1s, Analog Spark ===
In 2010, Razor & Tie established a joint venture imprint, Artery/Razor & Tie, with the Artery Foundation, a Sacramento-based management company. It released records by artists including Attila and Chelsea Grin. The joint venture concluded in 2014.

In 2012, Razor & Tie Music Publishing appeared for the second consecutive quarter in the Top 10 Billboard Country Publishers airplay chart. They had three No. 1 country hits in less than 12 months with "God Gave Me You", performed by Blake Shelton and written by singer/songwriter Dave Barnes, "Alone With You" performed by Jake Owen and co-written by Catt Gravitt and Shelton's "Over", co-written by David Elliott. Among other successful songs, "We Went", co-written by RTMP songwriter John King went to No. 1, and Greg Holden's song "Home" (as performed by American Idol Winner Phillip Phillips) hit No. 1 on 10 Billboard charts. As of 2016, the song was five times platinum. "Whiskey in My Water", performed by Tyler Farr and co-written with Phillip LaRue, also hit No. 1. In 2014, RTMP relocated its Nashville headquarters to a converted warehouse space In the SoBro neighborhood near Cannery Row. It houses several recording studios, writer and listening rooms, a rehearsal space, and a performance area.

With hit records from The Pretty Reckless, All That Remains, and Starset, Razor & Tie was the most successful independent rock label of the year, and the second strongest rock label overall in 2014. That same year, the company launched Washington Square Records. An alternative leaning label, Washington Square has since released records by artists including MOTHXR, Austin Plaine, Soren Bryce, My Jerusalem, and The Low Anthem. Analog Spark, an audiophile imprint focused on the reissue of classic, critically acclaimed albums on 180-gram vinyl and SACD, was established in February 2015. Analog Spark's first releases included titles from Glenn Gould and Dave Brubeck as well as the original cast recordings of My Fair Lady and West Side Story.

In 2015, Billboard published its inaugural "Greatest of All Time" rankings, a comprehensive collection of the best-selling songs, albums and artists in music history. With 22 Top 10 debuts since 2001, Kidz Bop was No. 4 on the "Most Billboard 200 Top 10 Albums" list, just behind The Rolling Stones, Barbra Streisand, The Beatles and Bob Dylan. Kidz Bop held the fourth-highest tally of any artist in history and the most Top 10 debuts of any artist since 2000.

After 25 years of operating independently, in September 2015, Concord Bicycle Music acquired a "significant" percentage of Razor & Tie to form Razor & Tie Enterprises, LLC. Under the new venture, Concord Bicycle will administer Razor & Tie Music Publishing, support the expansion of the Kidz Bop franchise, and provide other strategic resources. Balsam and Chenfeld remain the company's co-CEOs.

In April 2018, RT Industries, a new label created by Razor & Tie's founders, was launched, acquiring earlier the catalogs of several Warner Music Group artists, including Fat Joe and Sheena Easton. Warner Music Group, now through ADA division, markets them digitally.

== Associated labels ==
- Fearless Records
- Sh-K-Boom / Ghostlight
- Artery Recordings
- Prosthetic Records
- Analog Spark
- Fat Beats
