= Cledus T. Judd =

American country music artist (born 1964)

- Born: James Barry Poole; December 18, 1964 (age 61)
- Origin: Cartersville, Georgia, U.S.
- Genres: Country; parody
- Occupations: Singer-songwriter; parodist
- Instrument: Vocals
- Years active: 1995–2015; 2018–present
- Labels: Cross Three; Razor & Tie; Monument Nashville; Audium; Curb; E1; Warner Bros. Nashville; RoseyMo; Average Joes
- Spouse: Julie Reeves

James Barry Poole (born December 18, 1964) is an American country music artist who records under the name Cledus T. Judd. Known primarily for his parodies of popular country songs, he has been called the "Weird Al" Yankovic of country music, and his albums are usually an equal mix of original comedy songs and parodies. Judd has released 11 studio albums and two EPs, and several singles have entered the Billboard Hot Country Songs charts. His chart peak is the number-48 "I Love NASCAR", a parody of Toby Keith's 2003 single "I Love This Bar".

== Musical career ==
Judd moved to Nashville, Tennessee, to pursue a career in country music. By 1993, he was living in a house with Daron Norwood and preparing to move back home until he wrote a parody of "Indian Outlaw" by Tim McGraw, which made him decide to pursue a career as a parodist.

=== 1995–1999 ===
Cledus T. Judd released his debut album, Cledus T. Judd (No Relation), on Razor & Tie Records in 1995, the "(No Relation)" part of the title being a reference to Wynonna and Naomi Judd. Two non-country parodies were also included on this album, one of the Eagles' "Hotel California", and one of "We Are the World", a 1980s charity single credited to USA for Africa. Judd's parody, entitled "We Own the World", satirized the marriage of Lisa Marie Presley and Michael Jackson.

I Stoled This Record followed in 1996. This album, despite not producing a chart single, earned RIAA gold certification for shipping 500,000 copies. This album included parodies of two Shania Twain songs: "(If You're Not in It for Love) I'm Outta Here!" became "(I'm Not in Here for Love) Just a Beer" and "Any Man of Mine" became "If Shania Was Mine". John Michael Montgomery's "Sold (The Grundy County Auction Incident)" was also parodied twice on this album.

His third album, Did I Shave My Back for This? (a take-off on Deana Carter's Did I Shave My Legs for This?), included his first duet, with Buck Owens on the original track "First Redneck on the Internet". The album also parodied Alan Jackson, Joe Diffie, Brooks & Dunn, Mindy McCready, and Trace Adkins.

In 1999, Juddmental was his final album for Razor & Tie. It included a duet, this time with Daryle Singletary on "Ricky Tidwell's Momma's Gonna Play Football", a non-parody song previously recorded by Tim Wilson. This album once again parodied a Twain song, with her "Honey, I'm Home" becoming "Shania, I'm Broke". The Garth Brooks/Trisha Yearwood duet "In Another's Eyes" was also parodied on this compilation. It was originally to have been on Judd's previous album, but Brooks had initially expressed concern over a parody compromising the song's chances at winning a Grammy Award.

=== 2000–2005 ===
After leaving Razor & Tie Records, Judd signed to Monument Records Nashville in 2000 to release his fifth album, Just Another Day in Parodies. This album produced his first chart single in "My Cellmate Thinks I'm Sexy", a parody of Kenny Chesney's 1999 single "She Thinks My Tractor's Sexy", which referenced Chesney and McGraw's 2000 arrest for stealing a mounted reserve officer's horse. The parody charted at number 61 on Billboard Hot Country Singles and Tracks (now Hot Country Songs). Following this song was another chart single, "How Do You Milk a Cow" (based on Toby Keith's "How Do You Like Me Now?!"), which peaked at number 67; the music video also features Toby Keith. In 2002, he released Cledus Envy, followed later that year by a Christmas album entitled Cledus Navidad. At the end of the year, Judd also made an appearance in the music video for Keith's "Who's Your Daddy?".

His last release for Monument was a six-song EP called A Six Pack of Judd, released in 2003. After Monument closed its Nashville division, he signed to Koch Records Nashville to release a second EP, the four-song The Original Dixie Hick, later in 2003. This release, which contained parodies pertaining to the Dixie Chicks, also produced his third chart single in "Martie, Natalie and Emily (The Continuing Saga Of)", a parody of Brad Paisley's "Celebrity".

Judd's final release for Koch was 2004's Bipolar and Proud. This album produced two more chart singles for him, including his highest-peaking, the number-48 "I Love NASCAR", which parodied Keith's "I Love This Bar", and included guest vocals from Keith himself. Following this song was the number-58 "Bake Me a Country Ham", based on Tracy Lawrence's "Paint Me a Birmingham".

=== 2006–2014 ===
By mid-2005, Judd had announced plans to release a tribute album to Ray Stevens entitled Boogity, Boogity - A Tribute to the Comedic Genius of Ray Stevens, containing covers of Stevens's material with several guest vocalists. Due to the closure of Koch's Nashville division, however, this album was delayed until 2007, when Judd signed to Asylum-Curb Records and released it in August. Shortly before its release, he made his sixth chart appearance with the non-album song "Illegals".

Judd resigned to Koch in 2009, after the label was renamed E1 Music. In January of that year, he released the single "Waitin' on Obama" (a parody of Brad Paisley's "Waitin' on a Woman") referencing Barack Obama's election as President of the United States. This is the first single from Judd's latest album, Polyrically Uncorrect, released on June 30. Its second single is "Garth Must Be Busy", a parody of Brooks & Dunn's "God Must Be Busy", which features Brooks and Dunn as guest vocalists. Its third single is "(If I Had) Kellie Pickler's Boobs".

He transferred to Warner Bros. Records in 2012 to release Parodyziac!! The album includes a parody of Little Big Town's "Pontoon" titled "Honeymoon", the video of which was directed by Laura Bell Bundy.

Judd moved again to RoseyMo, a division of Average Joes Entertainment, in late 2014. On November 5, he released a new single titled "Luke Bryan", a parody of Robin Thicke's "Blurred Lines", which features guest rapping from Colt Ford.

=== 2015 retirement ===
In a January 2015 article in Billboard, Judd announced that he would be retiring from the music industry, as he felt that he had lost the desire to continue, and wanted to focus on raising his daughter, instead. He also revealed past struggles with a cocaine addiction and suicide attempts, and said that he made the decision to change his lifestyle after becoming baptized. In 2016, he issued a three-CD memoir titled Things I Remember Before I Forget.

Judd was one of the co-writers of the song "Three Feet of Water", the final track on Brantley Gilbert's album The Devil Don't Sleep.

=== 2018 comeback ===
In mid-2018, Judd announced his return to the music industry by releasing a new parody song and music video titled, "(Weight's Goin') Up Down, Up Down", a parody of "Up Down" by Morgan Wallen. It was followed by a parody of Bebe Rexha and Florida Georgia Line's "Meant to Be" called "Gotta Pee".

== Radio and television work ==
Judd has toured as an emcee with such acts as Brooks and Dunn, Brad Paisley, Trace Adkins, Toby Keith, the Dixie Chicks, Shania Twain, and Montgomery Gentry. Judd's television work includes a stint as the co-host of CMT Most Wanted Live from 2002 to 2004 and as a "special correspondent" on the 2005 season of Nashville Star. Additionally, he was one of the featured contestants on season five of VH1's reality show Celebrity Fit Club.

He also hosted the Cledus T. Party Morning Show for WQYK-FM in Tampa, Florida. In January 2008, he returned to Atlanta as the morning host at 94.9/The Bull, WUBL-FM. In September 2010, he returned to WQYK-FM as co-host of the Cledus and Dave Morning Show. On November 19, 2012, Judd became the co-host of The Cletus T. Judd Party with Clint and Judy morning show on iHeartMedia-owned WTCR-FM in Huntington, West Virginia, where he joined longtime morning hosts Clint McElroy and Judy Eaton. Judd stated that moving to WTCR allows him to live closer to his daughter.

== Musical style ==
Judd has been called the "Weird" Al Yankovic of country music. His albums typically contain a mix of parody songs and original songs. His parodies are often topical in nature, such as "My Cellmate Thinks I'm Sexy", a parody of Kenny Chesney's "She Thinks My Tractor's Sexy" or "Waitin' on Obama", which he released shortly before President Barack Obama took office in January 2009.

Initially, Judd sang in an intentionally off-key, nasal voice with an affected Southern accent, described by Country Standard Time critic Ken Burke as "Junior Samples on helium." Judd stopped affecting his voice on A Six Pack of Judd and all subsequent albums.

== Personal life ==
Judd was married to country music singer Julie Reeves. They have a daughter, Caitlyn. Judd married Amanda Fizer on October 5, 2017 and has two stepchildren, Isabella and Jeremiah.

After announcing his retirement in 2015, Judd focused on spending time with his family and doing a morning radio show. Once he was done with his radio show in the mornings, he had downtime and became bored. He then began working on buying and remodeling dilapidated houses.

After years of retirement, Judd was inspired to return to music by his idol, Ray Stevens, who asked Judd to open for him at a show in Kentucky. Stevens asked Judd why he retired and Judd responded that he did not think he was relevant anymore. Stevens told him that the 1,500 audience members giving Judd a standing ovation said otherwise. With the encouragement of his daughter, Judd decided to make a comeback.

== Discography ==
Albums

- Cledus T. Judd (No Relation) (1995)
- I Stoled This Record (1996)
- Did I Shave My Back for This? (1998)
- Juddmental (1999)
- Just Another Day in Parodies (2000)
- Cledus Envy (2002)
- Cledus Navidad (2002)
- A Six Pack of Judd (EP) (2003)
- The Original Dixie Hick (EP) (2003)
- Bipolar and Proud (2004)
- Boogity, Boogity - A Tribute to the Comedic Genius of Ray Stevens (2007)
- Polyrically Uncorrect (2009)
- Parodyziac!! (2012)
- Things I Remember Before I Forget (2016)
