= Broken Bridges (soundtrack) =

Soundtrack album by Various Artists
- Released: August 29, 2006
- Genre: Country
- Length: 41:11
- Label: Show Dog Nashville
- Producers: David Barrick; Vince Gill; Emory Gordy Jr.; Toby Keith; Scott Merritt; Randy Scruggs; Richard Young

Broken Bridges is the soundtrack to the 2006 film Broken Bridges, starring American musicians Toby Keith and Lindsey Haun. The album features Keith, Haun, and various other artists. It was released in 2006 via Show Dog Nashville (now Show Dog-Universal Music). The album contains Haun's single "Broken" and Keith's single "Crash Here Tonight".

== Content ==
The album was released on August 29, 2006 via Show Dog-Universal Music (then Show Dog Nashville), a label Keith owned at the time.

Several of the tracks from this album were released as singles and made the Hot Country Songs charts: Scotty Emerick's "What's Up with That" and Lindsey Haun's "Broken" both made No. 52 on the charts in 2006. Keith's own "Crash Here Tonight" also appeared on his 2006 album White Trash with Money, from which it was released as a single that year. "Jacky Don Tucker", the closing track, previously appeared on Keith's 1997 album Dream Walkin'.

The album itself reached a peak of No. 4 on the Top Country Albums chart dated for September 16, 2006.

== Critical reception ==
Giving it 2.5 out of 5 stars, Stephen Thomas Erlewine of Allmusic wrote that "the fact that Keith has brought in such understated songwriters as Fred Eaglesmith and Matraca Berg for his big-screen debut illustrates that he's a more complicated figure than some may initially think. But even if it's in good taste, Broken Bridges is frequently pleasant but rather dull".

== Track listing ==
No.	Title	Performer(s)	Writer(s)	Length
1.	"Broken Bridges"	Toby Keith & Lindsey Haun	Keith; Scotty Emerick	3:09
2.	"Thinkin' 'bout You"	Fred Eaglesmith	Eaglesmith	3:19
3.	"Crash Here Tonight"	Keith	Keith	2:11
4.	"Broken"	Lindsey Haun	Hillary Lindsey; Angelo Petraglia; Angela Lauer	4:00
5.	"Along for the Ride"	Matraca Berg	Berg; Sharon Vaughn	3:45
6.	"Uncloudy Day"	Keith; Willie Nelson; BeBe Winans	J. K. Alwood	3:54
7.	"What's Up with That"	Scotty Emerick	Emerick; Keith	3:01
8.	"High on the Mountain"	Flynnville Train	Tommy Bales, Brent Flynn, Brian Flynn, Jeremy Patterson, Wesley Robinson	3:50
9.	"The Battlefield"	Sonya Isaacs	Isaac, Vince Gill	3:14
10.	"Can't Go Back"	Keith	Keith	3:12
11.	"The Waiting Game"	Poor Richard's Hound	Keith; Emerick; Dean Dillon	2:52
12.	"Big Bull Rider"	Keith	Keith	2:04
13.	"Zig Zag Stop"	Keith	Keith; Randy Scruggs	2:35
14.	"Jacky Don Tucker (Play by the Rules Miss All the Fun)"	Keith	Keith; Chuck Cannon	5:35

== Charts ==
=== Weekly charts ===
Chart (2006–07)	Peak position
US Billboard 200	35
US Top Country Albums (Billboard)	4
US Soundtrack Albums (Billboard)	4

=== Year-end charts ===
Chart (2007)	Position
US Top Country Albums (Billboard)	47
US Soundtrack Albums (Billboard)	15
