= Big Dog Daddy =

Studio album by Toby Keith
- Released: June 12, 2007
- Genre: Country
- Length: 37:51
- Label: Show Dog Nashville
- Producer: Toby Keith

Toby Keith chronology
White Trash with Money (2006)	Big Dog Daddy (2007)	A Classic Christmas (2007)

Singles from Big Dog Daddy
- 1. "High Maintenance Woman" Released: February 13, 2007; 2. "Love Me If You Can" Released: June 26, 2007; 3. "Get My Drink On" Released: November 27, 2007

Big Dog Daddy is the twelfth studio album by American country music artist Toby Keith. It was released on June 12, 2007 by Show Dog Nashville. Its first single, "High Maintenance Woman," which was released before the album came out, peaked at number three on the country charts. The album debuted atop the Billboard 200 and Top Country Albums chart, selling 204,000 copies in its first week. It was Keith's third number one on the Billboard 200 and his fifth on the Top Country Albums chart. In addition, this was the first album of Keith's career that he produced entirely on his own, having previously co-produced all but his first two albums.

== Critical reception ==
Professional ratings
Review scores
Source	Rating
411Mania	(8/10)
About.com	5/5 stars
AllMusic	4/5 stars
The A.V. Club	B−
Common Sense Media	4/5 stars
Entertainment Weekly	A−
USA Today	3/4 stars

AllMusic's Stephen Thomas Erlewine gave praise to Keith's talents as a singer-songwriter, noting his storytelling abilities on the record's two covers and his exploration of both his sensitive and partying sides on "Wouldn't Wanna Be Ya" as "remarkably affecting", concluding with "And that's the real secret to Keith's success: underneath all the bragging he's a songwriter and a damn good one at that, which this lean, sinewy, stripped-to-the-basics record makes clear." Mitch Michaels of 411Mania called it "a great country album that foregoes poppy production and clever, forgettable clichés in favor of direct and excellent songwriting and a sound that hearkens back to the days of Willie Nelson and Waylon Jennings." Kathi Kamen Goldmark of Common Sense Media praised the musicianship and discussions of social class and wealth in America throughout the album but found criticism in some tracks containing alcohol debauchery and saccharine sentiment, concluding that Keith is "a man who's not afraid to be himself -- someone who knows his way around both small-town America and a musical hook, and isn't afraid to use it." Entertainment Weekly writer Ken Tucker praised Keith for delivering "artistic sincerity" and clever delivery and wordplay throughout the track listing, concluding that "All of this suggests Keith understands that beyond its default mode of rowdiness, country music is the soundtrack for adulthood, its pleasures as well as its disillusionments."

== Track listing ==
No.	Title	Writer(s)	Length
1.	"High Maintenance Woman"	Toby Keith, Tim Wilson, Danny Simpson	3:21
2.	"Love Me If You Can"	Chris Wallin, Craig Wiseman	3:36
3.	"White Rose"	Fred Eaglesmith	3:47
4.	"Get My Drink On"	Keith, Scotty Emerick, Dean Dillon	3:07
5.	"Wouldn't Wanna Be Ya"	Keith, Emerick	3:18
6.	"Big Dog Daddy"	Keith	3:53
7.	"I Know She Hung the Moon"	Keith, Emerick	3:35
8.	"Pump Jack"	Keith, Bobby Pinson	3:29
9.	"Burnin' Moonlight"	Keith, Emerick, Dillon	3:51
10.	"Walk It Off"	Keith, Emerick	3:02
11.	"Hit It"	Keith, Wiseman	2:52
Total length:			37:51

== Personnel ==
Credits for Big Dog Daddy adapted from AllMusic.

- Tom Bukovac – electric guitar
- Carter's Chord (Becky, Emily and Joanna Robertson) – background vocals
- Perry Coleman – background vocals
- Chad Cromwell – drums
- Eric Darken – percussion
- Shannon Forrest – drums
- Paul Franklin – steel guitar, Dobro
- Kenny Greenberg – electric guitar
- Aubrey Haynie – fiddle, mandolin
- Rob Ickes – Dobro
- Clayton Ivey – piano, keyboards
- Toby Keith – lead vocals, background vocals
- Jerry McPherson – electric guitar
- Brent Mason – electric guitar
- Mac McAnally – acoustic guitar
- Steve Nathan – piano, keyboards
- Dave Pomeroy – bass guitar
- Randy Scruggs – acoustic guitar
- Glenn Worf – bass guitar
- Jonathan Yudkin – strings

== Chart performance ==
=== Weekly charts ===
Chart (2007)	Peak position
US Billboard 200	1
US Top Country Albums (Billboard)	1

=== Year-end charts ===
Chart (2007)	Position
US Billboard 200	85
US Top Country Albums (Billboard)	19

== Certifications ==
Region	Certification	Certified units/sales
United States (RIAA)	Gold	500,000^{^}
^{^} Shipments figures based on certification alone.
