= A Mother's Gift =

2001 novel by Britney and Lynne Spears

- Author: Britney Spears and Lynne Spears
- Language: English
- Publisher: Delacorte Books for Young Readers
- Publication date: April 10, 2001
- Publication place: United States
- Media type: Print (hardcover)
- Pages: 240 pages
- ISBN: 0-385-72953-7
- OCLC: 46401727
- LC Class: PZ7.S739 Mo 2001

A Mother's Gift is a 2001 novel by American singer Britney Spears and her mother Lynne Spears. It is their second book together, following 2000's Heart to Heart. The novel is loosely based on Britney's life. Popular reactions to the novel in spaces like Amazon were mixed.

== Plot ==
The story is about a 14-year-old girl named Holly Faye Lovell from a tiny, rural town called Biscay in the U.S. state of Mississippi. She is accepted as a scholarship student into the exclusive Haverty School of Performing Arts, and the story revolves around Holly's life in Haverty, where she is the poorest student, and her relationship with her mother, Wanda.

== Film adaptation ==
The book was adapted for a 2004 ABC Family television film titled Brave New Girl (the new title comes from a song on Britney's 2003 album In the Zone). Although the plot was drastically changed, Britney was included as an executive producer of the film.

=== Cast ===
- Virginia Madsen as Wanda Lovell
- Lindsey Haun as Holly Lovell
- Barbara Mamabolo as Angela
- Jackie Rosenbaum as Ditz / Portia
- John Ralston as Jason Sloan
- Nick Roth as Grant
- Joanne Boland as Zoe Moscatel
- Karl Pruner as Professor
- Jayne Eastwood as Dee
