= Crossed Over =

- Film poster
- Based on: Crossed Over: A Murder, A Memoir by Beverly Lowry
- Screenplay by: John Wierick
- Directed by: Bobby Roth
- Starring: Diane Keaton; Jennifer Jason Leigh
- Theme music composer: Asher Ettinger; Tony Kosinec
- Country of origin: Canada
- Original language: English

Production
- Executive producers: Ed Gernon; Peter Sussman; Paula Weinstein
- Producer: Ian McDougall
- Cinematography: Eric Van Haren Noman
- Editor: Ralph Brunjes
- Running time: 120 minutes
- Production companies: Spring Creek Productions; Alliance Atlantis

Original release
- Network: CBS
- Release: March 3, 2002

Crossed Over is a 2002 Canadian television film directed by Bobby Roth, and starring Diane Keaton as Beverly Lowry and Jennifer Jason Leigh as Karla Faye Tucker. It is based on Lowry's memoir Crossed Over: A Murder, A Memoir.

== Cast ==
- Diane Keaton as Beverly Lowry
- Jennifer Jason Leigh as Karla Faye Tucker
- Maury Chaykin as Ethan Lowry
- Nick Roth as Peter Lowry
- Karl Pruner as Henry Quinn
- Patrick Galligan as Dana Brown
