= Nick Roth =

American screenwriter and actor (born 1985)

- Born: April 24, 1985 (age 41); Los Angeles, United States
- Occupations: Screenwriter and actor
- Parent(s): Bobby Roth; Leslie Tobin Bacon
- Relatives: Pamela Springsteen (step-mother)

Nicholas Tobin Roth (born April 24, 1985, in Los Angeles) is an American screenwriter and actor. He wrote, co-directed, and starred in Hanky Panky (2023), a comedy horror film.

== Early life ==
Roth was born in Los Angeles to parents in the film industry (his father is a director and his mother worked in distribution). He grew up in the city. He played the role of Sam in The Devil's Child, a 1997 television film which his father directed. In 2002's Canadian television film Crossed Over, which his father directed, he portrayed Diane Keaton's son. He went to grad school for his PhD degree in English at Cornell University in Ithaca, New York. After living in China for several months he wrote an adapted screenplay for Chronicles of the Ghostly Tribe which was in the top 20 for box office in China (in 2015).

Roth's short film Coming To won the jury's Grand Prize for Fearless Filmmaking at 2015's Slamdance Film Festival. Here is a quote from publicity for the festival: "Digital Bolex Fearless Filmmaking Grand Prize: Coming To, dir. by Lindsey Haun, DP Spencer Rollins, starring Jacob Demonte-Finn"–'A film that includes a little bit of everything in a very short time. Mystery, laughs, an impressive performance, and some mighty fine camerawork and cinematography... like any great short film, it has you desperately wanting to know what happens next.' The prize for winning was a 512gb Digital Bolex D16 Camera."

== Filmography ==
=== Works as a screenwriter ===
- Chronicles of the Ghostly Tribe (directed by Lu Chuan）
- Hanky Panky

==== Short film ====
- Coming To (also a producer) directed by Lindsey Haun

=== As an actor ===
- Berkeley – Ben (hero)
- Manhood – Charlie
