= Get My Drink On =

Single by Toby Keith

from the album Big Dog Daddy
- Released: November 27, 2007
- Recorded: 2007
- Genre: Country rock
- Length: 3:07 (album version); 2:54 (radio edit)
- Label: Show Dog Nashville
- Songwriters: Toby Keith; Scotty Emerick; Dean Dillon
- Producer: Toby Keith

Toby Keith singles chronology
"Love Me If You Can" (2007)	"Get My Drink On" (2007)	"She's a Hottie" (2008)

"Get My Drink On" is a song recorded by American country music singer Toby Keith, co-written by him, Scotty Emerick and Dean Dillon. It was released in November 2007 as the third and final single from his album Big Dog Daddy.

== Content ==
The song describes a narrator whose lover has left him, so he decides to "get [his] drink on" (i. e., consume alcohol until he is intoxicated). "Get My Drink On" is an up-tempo song with primarily spoken-word lyrics delivered at a rapid pace.

== Critical reception ==
Kevin John Coyne, reviewing the song for Country Universe, gave it an A− rating. He called the song "one of the best up-tempo romps in a career that’s been long on them in recent years."

== Peak positions ==
Chart (2007–2008)	Peak position
Canada Country (Billboard)	8
US Hot Country Songs (Billboard)	11
US Billboard Hot 100	88

=== Year-end charts ===
Chart (2008)	Position
US Country Songs (Billboard)	60
