= Pounded rice ritual =

The pounded rice ritual normally occurs with an arranged marriage occurring in Southeast Asia.

== Context of arranged marriage ==
An arranged marriage is one where elders of the prospective families negotiate the union with varying levels of input and involvement from the bride and groom. The wedding ceremony normally occurs at the home of the bride's family. The groom is carried on a chair along with his family to the bride's home. He then takes part in an all-night ceremony of worship while the other guests feast and celebrate. The day following the ceremony, the newly married couple travels to the home of the groom. During this journey the bride is carried by chair. The entire wedding party stops along the journey for a rest and for a very important ritual surrounding pounded rice.

== Ritual and meaning ==
Pounded rice is a popular snack in Southeast Asia. This ritual “... symbolically constructs through language the hierarchical relationship between the new husband and wife.” The bridal attendant places a plate of pounded rice on the lap of the wife. The husband, coached by his male kin, asks his wife in a formal manner, “Please bring the pounded rice, Wife; our wedding party has gotten hungry.” The wife, veiled and sobbing, is physically moved by the bridal attendant to pour a portion of the pounded rice into the open handkerchief of the husband. The husband then asks his wife again for some pounded rice, this time in an informal manner. The wife then pours another portion of the pounded rice into the handkerchief of her husband. He then asks her a third time for the pounded rice in the lowest linguistic form of their language. The wife then dumps the remaining rice into the handkerchief and the groom then hands out the snack to the wedding party. This ritual symbolizes the transition the bride has made from her marriage. She will now be spoken to in this extremely informal speech. The three attempts symbolize the groom's transition into treating his wife lower than he. This transition in linguistics symbolizes the hierarchy that will be faced in the marriage.
