= Deep Red (1994 film) =

- VHS cover
- Genre: Science fiction; Thriller
- Written by: D. Brent Mote
- Directed by: Craig R. Baxley
- Starring: Lindsey Haun; Michael Biehn; Tobin Bell
- Music by: Gary Chang
- Country of origin: United States
- Original language: English

Production
- Executive producer: Dave Bell
- Producers: Timothy Marx; D. Brent Mote
- Production location: Los Angeles
- Cinematography: João Fernandes
- Editor: Jeff Freeman
- Running time: 86 minutes
- Production companies: DBA Entertainment; MCA Television Entertainment

Original release
- Network: Sci-Fi Channel
- Release: March 12, 1994

Deep Red is a 1994 American sci-fi thriller television film directed by Craig R. Baxley, written by D. Brent Mote, and starring Michael Biehn and Lindsey Haun. It aired on the Sci-Fi Channel on March 12, 1994.

== Plot ==
An alien substance known as "Deep Red" infects a young girl named Gracie, causing unusual effects. A scientist named Dr. Newmeyer sets out to capture her, but she is protected by a security expert named Joe Keyes.

== Cast ==
- Lindsey Haun as Gracie Rickman
- Michael Biehn as Joe Keyes
- Tobin Bell as Warren Rickman
- Daniel W. Barringer as Milkman #1
- John Alden as Milkman #2
- John de Lancie as Thomas Newmeyer
- Lisa Collins as Mrs. Rickman
- Chayse Dacoda as Lydia
- Michael Des Barres as Lew Ramirez
- Kevin Page as Patrolman
- John Kapelos as Mack Waters
- Steven Williams as Det. Sgt. Eldon Hames
- Jamie Stern as Hotel clerk
- Joanna Pacula as Monica Quik
- Hank Cheyne as Bradley Parker
- Jesse Vint as Det. Rhodes
- Jack Andreozzi as Janitor
- Eric Fleeks as Deputy Medical Examiner
- José Rey as Desk Sergeant

== Release ==
Deep Red was first broadcast on the Sci-Fi Channel on March 12, 1994, followed by its video release on June 29, 1994. It was given an "R" rating.

== Reception ==
The science fiction, horror, and fantasy film review website moriareviews.com wrote, "All his other genre material shows Craig R. Baxley with an above-average competence as a director. Unfortunately, the same cannot be said for Deep Red. It certainly starts out with some promise. The story makes a stab at film noir atmosphere with Michael Biehn’s burned out detective/bodyguard hero receiving mysterious assignments from beautiful women. The film holds one intrigued for some time by the sheer strangeness of the proceedings – the pursuing thugs who cannot be harmed by bullets, only fire; the people who are much older than they appear to be; the little girl who is at the centre of the quest and can bend and metamorphose her body. The film keeps one bound to it by the fact that, in its adopting a mystery format, one wants to find a rationalising schema that will allow explanations to fall into place. Gradually though, it becomes apparent that the film doesn’t have much of an idea what is happening either. Or if the scriptwriter does, they have not done a particularly good job communicating it on screen. The entire script appears to be a lumpen pile of loose ends and abrupt changes of tone."

Reviewer Nils Bothman of the action film review website actionfreunde.de gave the film a rating of 4 out of 10 stars, concluding, "In this respect the director and actors make a fair effort and can exude a classic noir flair with likewise noir figures. Unfortunately they are straddling the apparent deficits in the budget and plot, meaning that 'Deep Red' is a rather passably entertaining and scantly exciting hybrid of crime noir and science fiction that does not live up to its potential."

Reviewer Dieter Krusche of the website filmdienst.de called the film "An outrageous story staged blandly and without any distinction which only clumsily implements its crude special effects."

The website tvspielfielm.de concluded its review by stating, "Wow, that's really a wild story, but at least Michael Biehn ('Terminator') lends the whole thing an air of plausibility."

The science fiction film review website scifimoviepage.com gave the film a rating of 1 out of 4 stars, writing, "Deep Red starts off promisingly enough as we are witnessing a battle between two enormous space ships in outer space. The one ship blows the other to bits. A piece of wreckage hurls through Earth's atmosphere and is lodged . . . into a small girl's hand! Thereafter it would be difficult for any movie to keep the same level of interest, but Deep Red fails more miserably than most. It soon involves Michael Biehn being chased around by a mad scientist and his sidekicks in search of an immortality treatment - or something like that. Michael Biehn clearly had better days when he was chased around by The Terminator since this is a film that clearly lacks any magic potion that'll guarantee celluloid immortality . . ."
