= High Maintenance Woman =

Single by Toby Keith

from the album Big Dog Daddy
- Released: February 13, 2007
- Recorded: 2006
- Genre: Country
- Length: 3:20
- Label: Show Dog Nashville
- Songwriters: Toby Keith; Danny Simpson; Tim Wilson
- Producer: Toby Keith

Toby Keith singles chronology
"Crash Here Tonight" (2006)	"High Maintenance Woman" (2007)	"Love Me If You Can" (2007)

Music video
- "High Maintenance Woman" on YouTube

"High Maintenance Woman" is a song co-written and recorded by American country music artist Toby Keith. It was released in February 2007 as the lead-off single from Toby's eleventh studio album Big Dog Daddy. Keith wrote the song single-handedly with additional writing credits from Tim Wilson and Danny Simpson. The track received positive reviews from critics who praised Keith's vocals and musicianship. "High Maintenance Woman" peaked at number three on the Billboard Hot Country Songs chart and number 67 on the Hot 100. The song achieved similar success in Canada, reaching the top 50 on the Canadian Hot 100.

== Background and development ==
Although Keith was technically the sole writer of "High Maintenance Woman," he gave co-writers' credit to comedian and singer Tim Wilson and Danny Simpson (Wilson's frequent co-writing partner), largely because Wilson and Simpson had previously composed together an unrelated song that also contained a similar premise. On his official website, Keith states:

I got to the studio and played ["High Maintenance Woman"] for the session guys and they said, "Aw, man. There's a comedian named Tim Wilson who's got a skit about that and has a little ditty song that's kind of the same thing."… Tim's a friend of mine, so I called him and told him about my song… I said I wouldn't even record mine without his blessing, which he gave. And just because I don't want anyone to ever think I copped his song, we threw him a small share of the writing and put their names on it.

The song tells of an apartment-building maintenance man who is attempting, and failing, to attract the attention of an attractive woman who lives in an apartment in the complex, and lamenting that "a high-maintenance woman don't want no maintenance man". In colloquial usage predating Keith's use of the term, a "high maintenance woman" is a woman regarded as overly demanding or fussy.

== Critical reception ==
Kevin John Coyne, reviewing the song for Country Universe, gave it an A− rating. Despite the story being told many times before and containing a "jaw-droppingly tacky double entendre", Coyne called it "a fantastic single" due to its writing and Keith's vocal performance. Kathi Kamen Goldmark of Common Sense Media praised the song's lead guitar and rhythm section for emitting catchy energy and the "memorably clever" lyricism. Entertainment Weekly writer Ken Tucker highlighted this and "Wouldn't Wanna Be Ya" for their clever vocalization and wordplay.

== Music video ==
The music video was directed by Michael Salomon and was released in early 2007. The guitar used in the video was a custom made Rockit Guitar built by Rod "Hot Rod" MacKenzie.

== Chart performance ==
"High Maintenance Woman" debuted at number 73 on the Billboard Hot 100 the week of March 3, 2007. Thirteen weeks later, it reached number 67 the week of June 2 and left the chart two weeks later. The song reappeared on the Hot 100 the week of June 30 at number 100 before leaving completely, staying on the chart for seventeen weeks. In Canada, the song debuted at number 78 on the Canadian Hot 100 the week of March 31. Six weeks later, it peaked at number 50 the week of May 12, remaining on the chart for thirteen weeks.

Chart (2007)	Peak position
US Hot Country Songs (Billboard)	3
US Billboard Hot 100	67
Canada Country (Billboard)	1
Canada Hot 100 (Billboard)	50

=== Year-end charts ===
Chart (2007)	Position
US Country Songs (Billboard)	23
