= A Little Too Late (Toby Keith song) =

Single by Toby Keith

from the album White Trash with Money
- Released: April 4, 2006
- Genre: Country
- Length: 4:06 (album version); 3:18 (radio edit)
- Label: Show Dog Nashville
- Songwriters: Toby Keith; Scotty Emerick; Dean Dillon
- Producers: Toby Keith; Lari White

Toby Keith singles chronology
"Get Drunk and Be Somebody" (2006)	"A Little Too Late" (2006)	"Crash Here Tonight" (2006)

"A Little Too Late" is a song co-written and recorded by American country music singer Toby Keith that reached the Top 5 on the Billboard Hot Country Songs chart. It was released in April 2006 as the second single from his CD White Trash with Money. Keith wrote the song with his frequent collaborator, Scotty Emerick, and Dean Dillon.

== Content ==
The song is a moderate up-tempo mostly accompanied by electric guitars. The song's lyrics show a male addressing a former female lover, telling her that the couple is through.

== Music video ==
A music video for "A Little Too Late," which was directed by Michael Salomon, and premiered on CMT and Great American Country on May 11, 2006. At the beginning of the music video, Keith appeared at the doorway of a basement stairwell with a shovel, announces that he's home, and begins playing a vinyl record of the single. He then approaches his ex-girlfriend (Krista Allen), who has been tied to a chair in the basement. After mocking her, Keith puts cement in a water trough by removing a tarp over a pallet of bricks. Keith builds a brick wall for the intent of sealing his girlfriend inside and leaving her; indeed, the woman's fear and apprehension grows, as Keith finished building his brick wall. Keith places the last brick after the song finishes. Keith continues to mock his girlfriend after the brick wall is completed. However, when Keith turns to leave, he realizes what he had failed to notice before, he was actually standing on the wrong side of the wall, and accidentally bricked himself inside. Suddenly, the young woman escapes from her binds. Then she bumps the vinyl record, causing the single to scratch, and she proceeds to leave the basement. Keith apologizes to her by meekly calling for help. Keith does not wear a cowboy hat in the video, but rather a baseball cap.

== Chart performance ==
This song debuted at number 45 on the U.S. Billboard Hot Country Songs chart on the chart dated April 29, 2006. Many radio stations added this song in its first official week of airplay, boosting the song to number 30 the next week. The song finally peaked at number 2 in early August, where it held for two weeks, after remaining at number 4 for four weeks.

Chart (2006)	Peak position
Canada Country (Billboard)	1
US Hot Country Songs (Billboard)	2
US Billboard Hot 100	53

=== Year-end charts ===
Chart (2006)	Position
US Country Songs (Billboard)	15
