= Mario Chamlee =

American opera singer

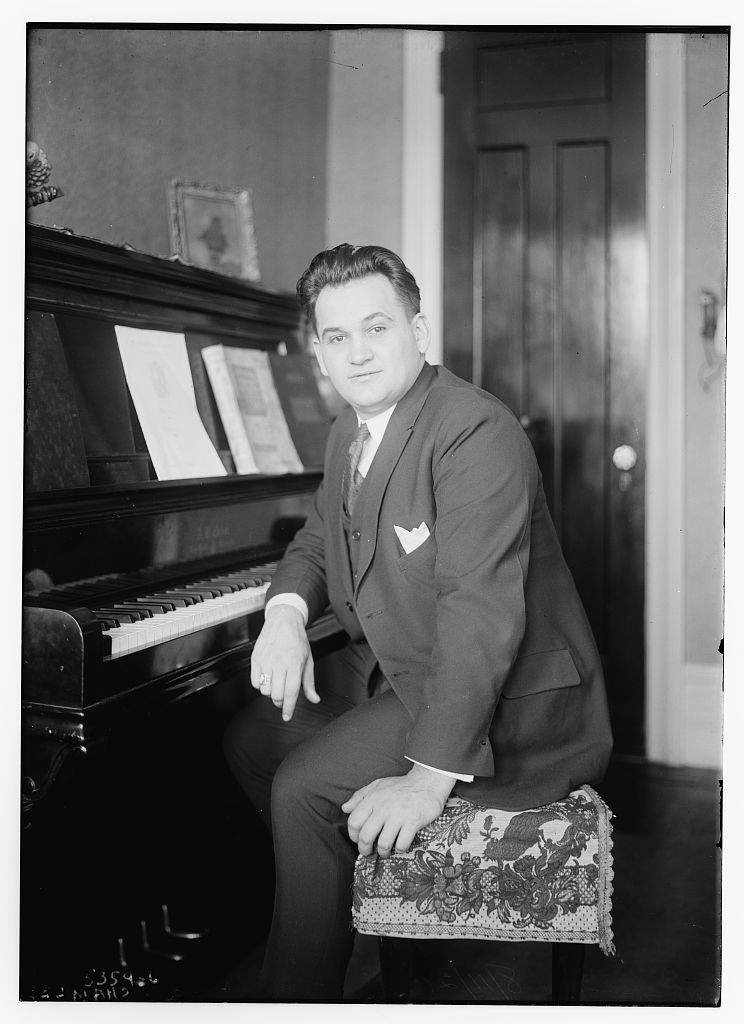
- Occupation: lyric tenor

Mario Chamlee (May 29, 1892 – November 13, 1966) was one of the lyric tenors who inherited several roles associated with Enrico Caruso at the Metropolitan Opera.

== Early years ==
His birth name was Archer Ragland Chamlee. Some references erroneous state that his birth surname was "Cholmondeley" which was the original family name before immigration to America. There is no record of his using it especially since his father and grandfather already used "Chamlee." Born in Los Angeles, California, he was the son of a physician (these same sources that gave his incorrect name also claim that his father was a minister but census records show his occupation as "physician"). Chamlee graduated from the University of Southern California where he studied science; he also played violin.

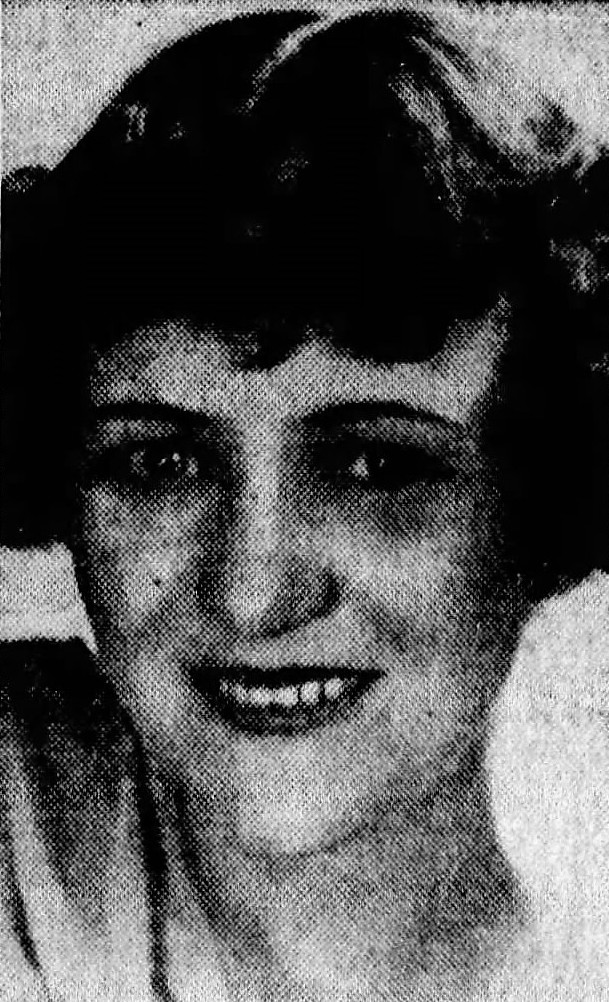
Ruth Miller Chamlee as a Los Angeles voice teacher in 1941

He first studied voice with Achille Alberti in Los Angeles and later with Sibella and Dellera in New York City. He made his debut in Los Angeles in 1916 as Edgardo in Lucia di Lammermoor with the Lombardi Opera Company. A year later, Chamlee went on tour with the Aborn Opera Company as "Mario Rodolfi", where he sang with soprano Ruth Miller. In 1919, Miss Miller became his wife. During two and a half years of mandatory military service, during World War I, Chamlee served as a member of the Argonne Players, a group of army soldiers who sang and entertained troops on the front line. The tenor was personally selected by General Pershing to perform with an ensemble for delegates at the 1919 Paris Peace Conference.

== Singing career after World War I ==
Mario Chamlee, 1924
"Serenade" by Riccardo Drigo

Upon his return to the United States in 1919, however, Chamlee devoted himself to developing his operatic talent. Beginning by singing at movie houses, he was discovered by baritone Antonio Scotti and joined the Scotti Opera Company. On November 20, 1920, Chamlee debuted at the Metropolitan Opera singing Cavaradossi. Engagements followed with various opera companies later in his career in the United States and Europe, including: the Ravinia Summer Opera in Chicago; the San Francisco Opera (where he performed Wagner); his acclaimed appearance in Henri Rabaud's Mârouf at the Paris Opera and the Brussels Théâtre de la Monnaie; the Vienna Volksoper; and the Neues Deutsches Theater in Prague. He later reprised Mârouf at his return to the Met. He also appeared in recitals with his wife (a noted soprano of the era).

== Later years ==
Chamlee's first records were made in 1917 under his "Mario Rodolfi" pseudonym for the Lyraphone Company of America's vertical-cut "Lyric" discs, but he later recorded exclusively on conventional 78s for Brunswick Records and was a successful recording artist in the 1920s, 1930s and 1940s. One of Chamlee's earliest supporters, Gus Haenschen, who directed the popular-music records of the Brunswick company, stated in several interviews that Brunswick's classical-music director, Walter B. Rogers, worked with Chamlee to imitate Caruso's phrasing and dynamics as heard on his (Caruso's) Victor Red Seal recordings. During his prior association with the Victor company, Rogers had overseen many of Caruso's recording sessions.

Chamlee emerged as one of the world's finest tenors in the era which followed Caruso's death in 1921. Chamlee's abilities, however, were underestimated. Although he was always well received by opera fans and critics alike across America and around the world and his records sold well, he never achieved the same level of recognition of his talents and abilities that his Italian contemporaries did, and Chamlee has been largely overlooked and forgotten in time. Chamlee retired from the opera stage at the age of 47. He and his wife subsequently devoted themselves to teaching voice to private students who hoped to pursue careers in grand opera, operetta or “light opera,” or Broadway musical productions. Their prize students included the Broadway star Anna Maria Alberghetti and the Las Vegas stage singer Rouvaun, who later billed himself on an album cover as "the world's greatest singer". Chamlee died in his native Los Angeles in 1966.
