= Rouvaun =

American singer (1932–1975)

Rouvaun (1932–1975) was born Jim Haun in Bingham, Utah. A child singer with the Mormon Tabernacle Choir in Salt Lake City, he went on to study voice at the Los Angeles Conservatory of Music and perform with the Beverly Hills Opera Company. Nonetheless, he remained a struggling woodworker studying voice. Rouvaun was a virtual unknown until February 5, 1967, when he appeared in Las Vegas as the headline singer leading the 100-person Frederick Apcar French stage review Casino De Paris at the Dunes Hotel. His first record label, KALAMO, described him on his debut album cover as "The World's Greatest Singer".

Nicknamed "The Vocal Vesuvius", Rouvaun continued performing on stage to sellout crowds and recorded a number of albums (see below). His career seemed to be blossoming until tragedy struck in 1975, when Rouvaun collapsed and died at age 43 due to massive internal hemorrhaging. Apparently the strain on his vocal cords had caused his esophagus to rupture.

Rouvaun's rise to stardom was not by accident. His first vocal coach was Mario Chamlee, a famed tenor among the many who tried to succeed Enrico Caruso at the Metropolitan Opera in the 1920s. Rouvaun then studied with Mario Silva, acclaimed voice coach of Mario Lanza. His singing career led to big city and foreign concerts. His hobbies included foreign cars, riding his motorcycle, target shooting, listening to jazz, and painting landscapes and seascapes in oil. He was marketed and promoted by Tony Alamo, who later became a notorious Christian minister. Rouvaun had a potential movie contract in the works to star in the life story of Mario Lanza and had the approval of the Lanza family, although the movie with Rouvaun never happened. Rouvaun's RCA Victor contract called for several long play records and singles to be recorded and released yearly.

He left behind a wife and children. One son, Jimmy Haun, went on to become guitarist with the rock group Air Supply. Jimmy Haun's daughter and Rouvaun's granddaughter is the television actress Lindsey Haun (born 1984). Rouvaun can be seen and heard here on television and audio clips. An official Rouvaun website put up by Rouvaun's family no longer exists, but a Rouvaun tribute website can still be found on Myspace featuring Rouvaun's music, biography and many photographs from his career (including his stint at the Dunes).

A Rouvaun Fan Club existed with many chapters, and comedian Jack Benny was President of the Burbank Chapter, according to program notes on the Rouvaun Album From the Heart of a Man.

Television appearances:

- The Ed Sullivan Show 1967.
- Jack Benny's Birthday Special 1969.

== Discography ==
- Rouvaun Sings Love Songs, Kalamo 42525, 1967
- The Sound of Rouvaun, RCA Victor 3866, 1967
- Walk Into My Life, RCA Victor 4038, 1968
- From the Heart of a Man, RCA Victor LSP-4145, 1969
- On Days Like These, RCA Victor LSP-4246, 1969
- The Time for Love is Anytime, RCA Victor LSP-4360, 1970
- A Song of Joy...and Love, RCA Victor LSP-4498, 1971
