= Doomlands =

- Title card
- Genre: Animated sitcom; Science fiction; Black comedy; Adventure
- Created by: Josh O'Keefe
- Voices of: Mark Little; Kayla Lorette; Roger Bainbridge; Ashley Holliday Tavares
- Countries of origin: Canada; United States
- Original language: English
- No. of seasons: 2
- No. of episodes: 15

Production
- Producer: Josh Bowen
- Running time: 10 minutes (season 1); 22 minutes (season 2)
- Production company: Look Mom! Productions

Original release
- Network: The Roku Channel
- Release: January 28, 2022 – September 3, 2024

Doomlands is an adult animated television series created by Josh O'Keefe, and produced by Look Mom! Productions, a subsidiary of Blue Ant Media. Originally produced for Quibi, the series was acquired by Roku, and premiered on its streaming platform, The Roku Channel, on January 28, 2022.

In 2022, the second season was renewed. The second season was previewed at MIPCOM on October 3, 2023. The second season was released on September 3, 2024.

== Plot ==
The series follows the infamous Danny Doom and aspiring bartender, Lhandi, serving beer across a hellish wasteland in their mobile pub, The Oasis. Their job takes them head-on with ruthless desert gangs, memory-stealing creeps, and even mean latrinalia, all while trying not to kill each other.

Producer Josh Bowen describes the show as “Mad Max meets Cheers in the Mos Eisley Cantina.”

== Voice cast ==
- Mark Little as Danny Doom
- Kayla Lorette as Lhandi
- Roger Bainbridge as Jep
- Ashley Holliday Tavares as Xanthena

== Episodes ==
Season	Episodes	Originally released
1	10	January 28, 2022
2	5	September 3, 2024

=== Season 1 (2022) ===
No. overall	No. in season	Title	Original release date
1	1	"Razorbowl"	January 28, 2022
Danny Doom makes a questionable deal with one of the Wasteland's shadiest characters in order to save his favorite sporting event, The Razorbowl; Lhandi uncovers a piece of Danny's past in the process and gets a bit too personal.
2	2	"I Hate Danny Doom"	January 28, 2022
Danny Doom faces off with his arch nemesis, Sunny Sinclair, to prove he hasn't been lying about his bold victories all along (he has).
3	3	"Barry"	January 28, 2022
When bar regular Barry steals the Oasis's singing fish and skips out on his bill, the crew chase him through the Wastes all the way to his home in the swamps; they find themselves in danger when Lhandi takes matters into her own hands.
4	4	"Lady X"	January 28, 2022
Xanthena is propelled into Wastelands fame when Danny Doom discovers that her music can literally lift the mood of depressed Wastelanders.
5	5	"Imaginary Fiends"	January 28, 2022
In a desperate attempt to force a friendship between herself and Onorato, Lhandi gets the gang mixed up with a dangerous group of Riccardos.
6	6	"Tastes of the Wastes"	January 28, 2022
After Danny's feelings are hurt by some mean bathroom graffiti, he falls into crisis and abandons the crew; left on their own, the crew must handle a very important guest.
7	7	"Onorato's Choice"	January 28, 2022
During a weeks-long tornado storm, Onorato gives birth to a clutch of eggs; trapped with no food, Danny and the crew must choose between friendship and starvation.
8	8	"Jep the Lover"	January 28, 2022
After doing Danny a big favor, Jep makes a romantic connection with one of the Oasis bar regulars; it could be true love, but things get messy when Danny realizes he doesn't like sharing Jep with anyone else.
9	9	"Daddy's Girl, Part 1"	January 28, 2022
10	10	"Daddy's Girl, Part 2"	January 28, 2022

=== Season 2 (2024) ===
No. overall	No. in season	Title	Original release date
11	1	"Some Baddie That I Used to Know"	September 3, 2024
12	2	"Please, My Jo-Jo"	September 3, 2024
13	3	"Big Knight"	September 3, 2024
14	4	"Gridlock"	September 3, 2024
15	5	"Edge Race"	September 3, 2024

== Production ==
Paying homage to his Australian upbringing and love for “Ozploitation” film, series creator O’Keefe began the project through a successful Kickstarter campaign in 2015. The series was then picked up by Look Mom! Productions, a Blue Ant Studios company, and developed with Executive Producer Joshua Bowen.

The series was initially commissioned by the now-defunct streaming service Quibi in April 2020 before it went dark later that year. Roku subsequently acquired the series in January 2021, and premiered it on The Roku Channel on January 28, 2022.

The project was produced almost entirely throughout the COVID-19 pandemic. Producer Josh Bowen is quoted as saying "Josh (O'Keefe) literally produced this show from my mom's basement with the help of her home cooked meals. The final product is a testament to the resilience and adaptability of our team."

== Reception ==
Melissa Camacho of Common Sense Media gave the series a 3 out of 5. Justin Epps with BubbleBlabber gave Season 1 a 7/10.
