= Get Drunk and Be Somebody =

Single by Toby Keith

from the album White Trash with Money
- Released: December 20, 2005
- Genre: Country
- Length: 2:59
- Label: Show Dog Nashville
- Songwriters: Toby Keith; Scotty Emerick
- Producers: Toby Keith; Lari White

Toby Keith singles chronology
| "Big Blue Note" (2005) | "Get Drunk and Be Somebody" (2005) | "A Little Too Late" (2006) |

"Get Drunk and Be Somebody" is a song co-written and recorded by American country music artist Toby Keith. It was released on December 20, 2005, as the first single from Keith's album White Trash with Money. It was also Keith's first single released by Show Dog Nashville after Dreamworks Records closed its country division. It peaked at number 3 on the country singles charts. Keith wrote the song with Scotty Emerick.

== Content ==
This song is a typical working man's anthem in which two workers who are depressed by their mundane jobs celebrate on Friday by drinking.

== Music video ==
The live music video was directed by Michael Salomon, and premiered on CMT on February 14, 2006. GAC cut the ending of the video due to suggestive language. Keith tells the audience, referring to his shooting the video as part of the concert. During the bridge of the song, the lyrics appear onscreen, so the audience can sing along. It is a live performance clip that was filmed at a concert in Portland, Oregon, at the Rose Garden Arena, which later became Moda Center.

== Chart positions ==
"Get Drunk and Be Somebody" debuted at number 32 on the U.S. Billboard Hot Country Singles & Tracks.

| Chart (2005–2006) | Peak position |
|---|---|
| Canada Country (Radio & Records) | 3 |
| US Hot Country Songs (Billboard) | 3 |
| US Billboard Hot 100 | 47 |
| US Billboard Pop 100 | 64 |

=== Year-end charts ===
| Chart (2006) | Position |
|---|---|
| US Country Songs (Billboard) | 31 |

== Certifications ==
| Region | Certification | Certified units/sales |
|---|---|---|
| United States (RIAA) | Gold | 500,000^{‡} |
^{‡} Sales+streaming figures based on certification alone.
