= Rome & Jewel =

- Theatrical release poster
- Directed by: Charles T. Kanganis
- Written by: Charles T. Kanganis
- Based on: Romeo and Juliet by William Shakespeare
- Produced by: Charles T. Kanganis
- Starring: Nate Parker; Lindsey Haun; Allen Maldonado; Elijah Kelley; Cleavant Derricks; John Rubinstein
- Cinematography: John Buckley
- Edited by: Lee Grubin
- Music by: Neil Bagg; Eric Monsanty
- Distributed by: Emerging Pictures
- Release date: February 22, 2006
- Running time: 90 minutes
- Country: United States
- Language: English
- Box office: $470

Rome & Jewel is a 2006 American hip-hop musical film adaptation of William Shakespeare's Romeo and Juliet set in Los Angeles that deals with interracial love. The film stars Nate Parker as Rome and Lindsey Haun as Jewel. The 2008 re-release had modest box office results and mostly negative critical commentary.

== Plot ==
Compton-native Rome (Nate Parker) is the son of Reverend Q (Cleavant Derricks) and yearns for Jewel (Lindsey Haun), the daughter of Los Angeles Mayor Capps (John Rubinstein) who lives in Beverly Hills.

Using reworked dialogue from the play such as "deep inside I’m tender/sweeter than Splenda/and if you must know the truth/my heart's not bulletproof" Rome woos Jewel, despite his father's wishes that he avoid upper-class white women after he meets her at her sweet 16 party. It is love at first sight over a shared rap discourse and the duo have a quick wedding in Las Vegas. After a tragic ending befalls the teens, the fathers come to a realization that color should not distinguish humanity.

== Cast ==
- Nate Parker as Rome
- Lindsey Haun as Jewel
- Allen Maldonado as "Mercury"
- Elijah Kelley as Ben
- John Rubinstein as Mayor Capps
- Cleavant Derricks as Reverend Q
- Greg Siff as Ty
- Stephanie Dyann as Kara
- Russell Howard as Perry
- Cole Griffin as Jay

== Production ==
The film was written, directed, and produced by Charles T. Kanganis, produced by Nestor N. Rodriguez, and has music by Eric Monsanty and lyrics by Neil Bagg.

== Release ==
The film was released for theatrical presentation on February 22, 2006 and November 28, 2008 and released on DVD on March 9, 2010. Its 2008 re-release was in one theater for one week earning $470.

== Reception ==
Aaron Hillis of The Village Voice described the movie as a "soapy, contemporary L.A.-set adaptation". Nathan Lee of The New York Times said the film was "a retrograde, thoroughly schematic conflict between rich, snooty white kids and working-class blacks". Robert Koehler, writing for Variety, said it was a "tone-deaf and culturally silly adaptation, which pits Beverly Hills whites against Compton blacks". Lee also indicated that the divisiveness was a bit contrived and that the film breathes life into the socioeconomic consideration it hopes to fight.
