= Ashley Holliday =

American actress

- Occupations: Actress, Director
- Years active: 1986–present

Ashley Holliday is an American actress. She is best known for playing Chloe Delgado on the 2010 ABC Family series Huge and Melissa Sanders on the 2012 Nick at Nite serial drama Hollywood Heights. She also starred in the 2023 comedy horror film Hanky Panky.

== Personal life ==
Tavares attended the Los Angeles County High School for the Arts and DePaul University, where she studied theater.

== Career ==
Tavares began her career with an appearance on an episode of Miami Vice in 1986. Her breakout role came in 2010, when Tavares landed a leading role in the ABC Family series Huge. She followed that with the role of Melissa Sanders on TeenNick's Hollywood Heights. Ashley has done voices on Robot Chicken and guest starred on shows such as Disney's K.C. Undercover, and The People v. O. J. Simpson: American Crime Story. In 2012, she made her film debut in The Man Who Shook the Hand of Vicente Fernandez.

== Filmography ==
=== Film ===
Year	Title	Role	Notes
1995	Just Cause	Slumber Party Girl	as Ashley Popelka
1997	Wild America	Mountain Family Daughter	as Ashley Popelka
2006	Discreet	Angie	Also co-director and associate producer
2010	You, Only Better...	Jackie Mabovitch	
2012	The Man Who Shook the Hand of Vicente Fernandez	Rita	
2014	Hanky Panky (short)	Diane	Short
2014	Nanoblood	Satisfied Customer	Short
2018	Meat Cute	Lily	Short. Also writer and director
2018	Big Fork	Lauren	
2023	Hanky Panky	Diane	

=== Television series ===
Year	Title	Role	Network	Notes
1986	Miami Vice	Baby Demarco	NBC	1 episode: "Baby Blues"
2010	Huge	Chloe Delgado	ABC Family	10 episodes
2012	Hollywood Heights	Melissa Sanders	Nick at Nite	Main
2013	Ravenswood	Lila Collins	ABC Family	Recurring guest star, 2 episodes: "The Devil Has a Face" & "Scared to Death"
2015, 2018	Robot Chicken	Various Voices	Adult Swim	2 episodes, guest star
2016	The People v. O. J. Simpson: American Crime Story	Donna Estrella	FX	1 episode, co-star
2017	K.C. Undercover	Ms. Schaffer	Disney Channel	2 episodes, guest star
2021	The Rookie	Callista	Netflix	1 episode: "In the line of fire"
2022	Raven's Home	Ms. Linda	Disney Channel	1 episode: "21 Lunch Street"
2022–24	Doomlands	Xanthenea	The Roku Channel	Main
2023	My Life with the Walter Boys	Tara	Netflix	

=== Music videos ===
Year	Title	Artist
2013	"For the Win"	Team Unicorn
2013	”Flow”	Brittany Underwood
2014	"Heart of the Moment"	Mansions on the Moon
