= Love Me If You Can =

Single by Toby Keith

from the album Big Dog Daddy
- Released: June 26, 2007
- Recorded: 2007
- Genre: Country
- Length: 3:36
- Label: Show Dog Nashville
- Songwriters: Chris Wallin; Craig Wiseman
- Producer: Toby Keith

Toby Keith singles chronology
"High Maintenance Woman" (2007)	"Love Me If You Can" (2007)	"Get My Drink On" (2007)

"Love Me If You Can" is a song written by Chris Wallin and Craig Wiseman, and recorded by American country music artist Toby Keith. It was released in June 2007 as the second single from the album Big Dog Daddy. The song became his 34th Top Ten single and his 16th number one hit on the U.S. Billboard Hot Country Songs chart. It is also Keith's first Billboard number one single since he started his own label (Show Dog Nashville) in 2005.

== Content ==
The song is a mid-tempo ballad in which Keith addresses the criticism that he received after his 2002 pro-war anthem "Courtesy of the Red, White, & Blue (The Angry American)". In the song, Keith states that he is a "man of [his] convictions" who stands beside his own views, in spite of any controversy that they might cause.

== Critical reception ==
Kevin John Coyne, reviewing the song for Country Universe, gave it a B rating. He says that Keith makes "a surprisingly earnest attempt to soften his image, wishing we could all just agree to disagree before our debates turn to angry words, and praying for peace on earth, even though war is sometimes necessary."

== Music video ==
The music video was directed by Michael Salomon and was released on July 3, 2007.

== Charts ==
"Love Me If You Can" debuted at number 42 on the U.S. Billboard Hot Country Songs for the week of June 23, 2007.

Chart (2007)	Peak position
US Hot Country Songs (Billboard)	1
US Billboard Hot 100	48
Canada Country (Billboard)	14
Canada Hot 100 (Billboard)	76

=== Year-end charts ===
Chart (2007)	Position
US Country Songs (Billboard)	18
