= Hanky Panky (2023 film) =

Comedy horror film

- Directed by: Lindsey Haun and Nick Roth
- Written by: Nick Roth
- Starring: Jacob DeMonte-Finn; Ashley Holliday; Christina Laskay; Anthony Rutowicz; Clare Grant; Azure Parsons; Toby Bryan; Lindsey Haun; Nick Roth; Seth Green
- Cinematography: Chris Wedding; Morgan Demeter; Kevin Schlanser
- Edited by: Nick Roth; Lindsey Haun
- Music by: Jimmy Haun
- Distributed by: DeskPop Entertainment
- Release date: December 9, 2023 (premiere)
- Running time: 87 minutes
- Country: United States
- Language: English

Hanky Panky is a 2023 American comedy horror film written by Nick Roth and directed by Roth and Lindsey Haun, featuring an ensemble cast including Jacob DeMonte-Finn, Ashley Holliday, Christina Laskay, Anthony Rutowicz, Clare Grant, Azure Parsons, Toby Bryan, Seth Green, and Roth and Haun themselves. In the film, a crude talking handkerchief vies with an evil killer top hat for the fate of the universe.

== Plot ==
The sweet and quirky ayahuasca marriage counselor Diane mistakenly invites the wrong "Sam" to a retreat which she is co-hosting with friends and family at an isolated snowy mountain cabin. Instead of her best friend's sister Samantha showing up, she gets Sam, a socially anxious oddball. Sam is accompanied by his best friend, Woody, a foul-mouthed talking handkerchief which Sam believes only he can hear. Woody is reportedly sexually aroused by cleaning up messes. Diane is Sam's opposite, but it's love at first sight. The only thing that stands between them is that right away everyone in the cabin starts being mysteriously murdered, and the whole vacation quickly descends into a zany pandemonium of cults, psychedelics, aliens, and, as Woody himself puts it, delicious chaos.

== Cast ==
- Jacob DeMonte-Finn as Sam
- Ashley Holliday as Diane
- Christina Laskay as Carla
- Anthony Rutowicz as Cliff
- Clare Grant as Kelly
- Toby Bryan as Woody / Norm
- Lindsey Haun as Rebecca
- Nick Roth as Dr. Crane
- Nick Risher as Neighbor
- Seth Green as Harry "The Hat"

== Production ==
The film was produced without a budget, with the small cast and crew splitting costs and living together in the cabin in northern Utah in which the film was almost entirely shot. It was shot on the Digital Bolex D16 camera.

Principal photography began and was completed in January 2016. Post-production on the film was completed in 2023.

== Release ==
The film premiered at the Los Angeles Comedy Film Festival on December 9, 2023, and was released streaming worldwide on Apple TV, Amazon Prime, Google Play, and Fandango at Home by DeskPop Entertainment on April 19, 2024.

== Reception ==
The film received generally positive reviews from critics: on review aggregator website Rotten Tomatoes, the film has a 90% rating, based on 20 reviews.

Kristy Puchko of Mashable praised the film as a "gleefully absurd avalanche of silliness... the comedy equivalent of a Jackson Pollock," and Film Ireland called it "a genre-bending rollercoaster that seamlessly blends elements of comedy and horror, all while descending to a new level of insanity... A surreal success in ambitious independent filmmaking."

The film has also received 53 awards and 8 nominations from film festivals.
