= Chayse Dacoda =

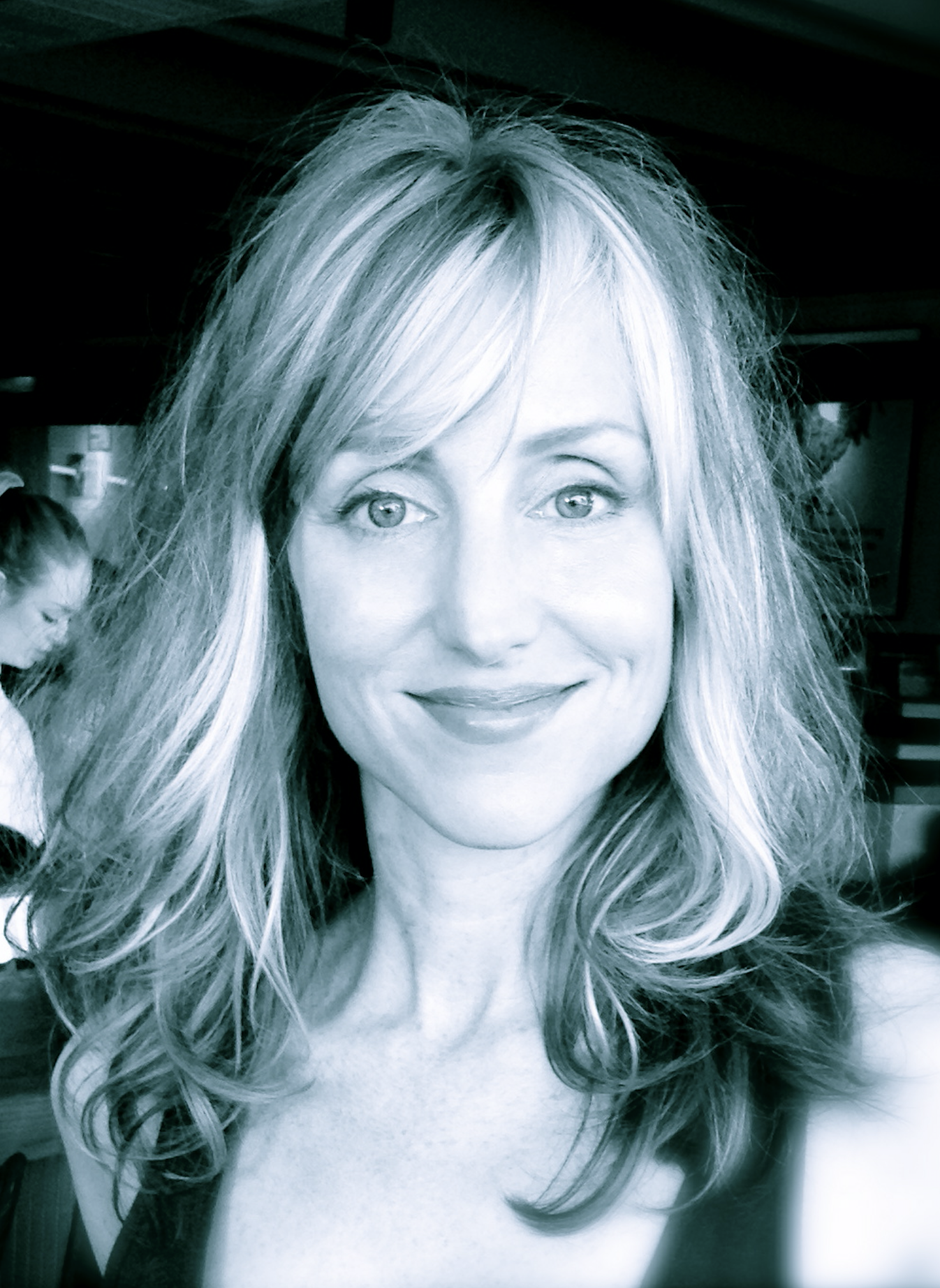
- Born: New Jersey, U.S.
- Education: Michigan State University, University of Pennsylvania
- Occupations: Founder & Entrepreneur, Designer, Television Personality, Writer
- Writing career
- Language: English, French
- Years active: 2002-
- Notable works: While You Were Out, HGTV's Get It Together
- Website: nothingwithoutwater.org

Chayse Dacoda is an American born interior designer, product designer, host, spokesperson and comedienne. She is best known for her work on TLC's While You Were Out which was nominated for an Emmy, HGTV's Get it Together and NBC's & LxTV's Show Open House. She also has designed rugs for Jaipur Rugs in India.

== Early life ==
Chayse Dacoda was born in New Jersey and studied economics at both Michigan State University and University of Pennsylvania.

== Nothing Without Water ==
Dacoda, an activist for the natural environment, launched Nothing Without Water, a non-profit foundation in 2024. Its goal is to raise awareness with the public around water scarcity and water management, globally. The foundation launched two initiatives: First is, The Water Couch, a podcast to create and engage a dialogue regarding water. Second, The Water Museum, to showcase the past, present, and future of water through time.

== Career ==
=== Early career ===
Dacoda credits screenwriting professor Jim Cash (who wrote Top Gun) at Michigan State University for her move to Los Angeles with a feature film treatment in hand that she had written while she was still studying economics in college.

After college, instead of keeping the job at a trading desk in Philadelphia trading municipal bonds Dacoda moved west to California for a writing career, and as a backup plan and a day job launched into the Southern California real estate market. She quickly acquired a real estate license and shortly after started designing and transforming homes for clients.

While she was finding her way in the real estate industry, she was also getting acquainted with The Groundlings, did stand-up comedy at The Laugh Factory, and hosted for channels and clients such as FX, Comcast, and MTV.

=== Interior design ===
Chayse Dacoda established Dacoda Design, a design and lifestyle firm, in 1998 to consult and design projects both residential and commercial in North America. Her work has been dominantly focused on both the west and east coasts of United States with offices in New York and Beverly Hills.

Some notable projects have been The Roosevelt Lofts, a home in the Urban Glass House in Tribeca, New York, VIP space for The Billboard Music Awards in Vegas, multiple Engel & Völkers Southern California Real Estate Offices, and multiple residential dwellings for clients around the country. Dacoda has been published in The Washington Post, Woman's Day Magazine, Grace Ormonde Weddings and People Magazine, among others (future link). She has appeared on the Today Show as an expert in Interior Design. In 2009 she started designing products for the mass market to include a line of rugs for Jaipur Rugs.

Dacoda has also judged and designed a Residential Home Curb Appeal Makeover Contest for several years for Clopay Garage Doors, and was published on the topic of curb appeal. She has also done Satellite Media Tours for Tarkett Flooring.

=== Television ===
In addition to early comedy work including improvisation, stand-up comedy and various hosting jobs Dacoda cast in a TV show where she did surprise design makeovers for TLC's popular show While You Were Out, which was nominated for an Emmy Award. She was rumored to be involved with the carpenter Andrew Dan-Jumbo though the two were just good friends. In the 4 seasons While You Were Out was on TLC, she completed over 70 episodes and became known for the ‘on-the-fly’ designs that were added in Season 3, where the designer would have no previous knowledge of the space they were designing prior to arriving a day before the renovation began.

She also hosted and designed two seasons for HGTV's Get It Together; a show that emphasized merging two divergent people's design tastes so they could live harmoniously under one roof. Dacoda also occasionally guest-hosted on NBC's show Open House.
