= Broken Bridges =

2006 film by Steven Goldmann

- Promotional poster for Broken Bridges.
- Directed by: Steven Goldmann
- Written by: Cherie Bennett; Jeff Gottesfeld
- Produced by: Sara Risher; Donald Zuckerman
- Starring: Toby Keith; Kelly Preston; Lindsey Haun; Burt Reynolds
- Cinematography: Patrick Cady
- Edited by: Maysie Hoy
- Music by: Toby Keith
- Production companies: CMT Films; Paramount Home Entertainment
- Distributed by: Paramount Classics
- Release date: September 8, 2006
- Running time: 105 minutes
- Country: United States
- Language: English
- Budget: $11 million
- Box office: $252,539 (USA)

Broken Bridges is a 2006 American drama film starring Toby Keith in his film debut, Lindsey Haun, Burt Reynolds and Kelly Preston. The film, a music-drama, is centered on a fading country singer's return to his hometown near a military base in Tennessee where several young men who were killed in a training exercise on the base were from. He is reunited with his former sweetheart and estranged daughter, who returns to the town as well.

== Plot ==
Bo Price, a down-and-out country singer, has returned home for his brother's funeral following a military training accident. While there, he reunites with his true love, Angela Delton, a Miami news reporter who has also returned home for her brother's funeral. Bo also meets their 16-year-old daughter, Dixie Leigh Delton, for the first time. Since Bo walked away from Angela while she was still pregnant, Dixie has never met him or his side of the family. Dixie has experimented with alcohol, but is able to break free with the help of her now-sober father. With her father's musical blood running through her veins, Dixie closes the movie by singing a song she wrote at the memorial for the fallen soldiers.

== Cast ==
- Toby Keith as Bo Price
- Kelly Preston as Angela "Angel" Delton
- Lindsey Haun as Dixie Leigh Delton
- Tess Harper as Dixie Rose Delton
- Burt Reynolds as Jake Delton
- Willie Nelson as Himself
- BeBe Winans as Himself
- Seth Chalmers as Jerome
- Josh Henderson as Wyatt
- Anna Maria Horsford as Loretta

== Reception ==
=== Box office ===
The film had a poor box office gross of $252,539 in four weeks of release. The film has sold over $8 million in DVD sales, and repeated often on CMT, Country Music Television.

=== Critical response ===
On the review aggregator website Rotten Tomatoes, 5% of 21 critics' reviews are positive, with an average rating of 3.6/10. The website's consensus reads: "A cliched attempt at a feel-good drama, Broken Bridges is schmaltzy, predictable, and stiffly acted." Metacritic, which uses a weighted average, assigned the film a score of 32 out of 100, based on 7 critics, indicating "generally unfavorable" reviews.

Joe Leydon of Variety wrote: "It's obviously intended as a star vehicle, but Broken Bridges turns out to be a rattletrap jalopy for country music performer Toby Keith." Maitland McDonagh of TV Guide gave it 2 out of 4 and wrote: "The Country Music Channel's first foray into feature filmmaking is sickly sweet and thoroughly predictable."

== Soundtrack ==
The movie's soundtrack was released on August 29, 2006 via Show Dog Nashville (now Show Dog-Universal Music). It features songs by Keith, Haun, and various other artists. Keith's own "Crash Here Tonight", appearing on both the soundtrack and his 2006 album White Trash with Money, was released as a single.
