= Beverly Lowry =

American novelist

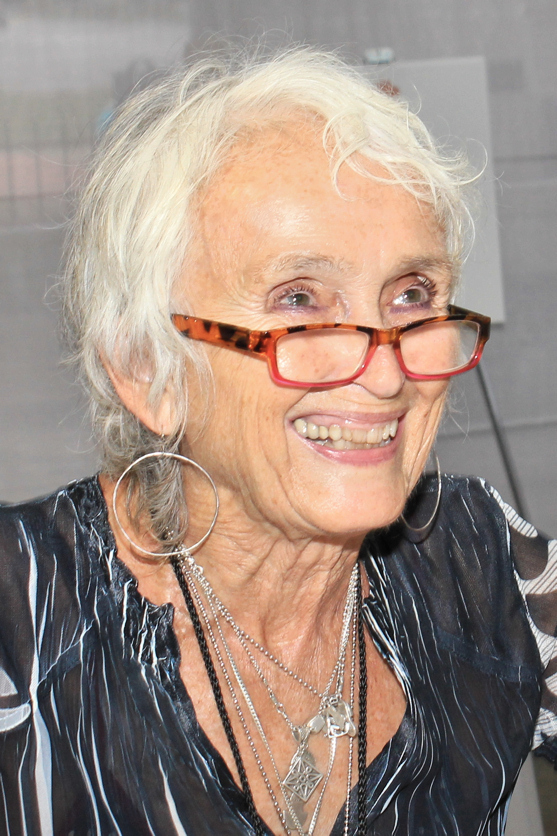
- Lowry in 2016
- Born: Beverly Fey; August 10, 1938 (age 88); Memphis, Tennessee, U.S.
- Education: University of Mississippi; Memphis State University (BA)
- Occupations: Educator; novelist; short story writer
- Spouse: Glenn Lowry (m. 1960)
- Parent(s): David Leonard Fey; Dora Smith

Beverly Lowry (born August 10, 1938) is an American educator, novelist and short story writer.

== Biography ==
The daughter of David Leonard Fey and Dora Smith, both natives of Arkansas, she was born Beverly Fey in Memphis, Tennessee and grew up in Greenville, Mississippi. She was educated at the University of Mississippi and Memphis State University, receiving a BA from the latter institution in 1960. In 1960, she married Glenn Lowry and moved to Manhattan. In 1965, the family moved to Houston and she began writing. In 1976, Lowry began teaching fiction writing at the University of Houston.

In 1977, she published her first novel Come Back, Lolly Ray. This was followed by Emma Blue in 1978. In 1981, she published Daddy's Girl, which won the Jesse Jones Award from the Texas Institute of Letters. Her short story "So far from the Road, So Long until Morning" won the Texas Institute of Letters short story award in that year.

In the 1990s, Lowry moved to Los Angeles. She taught at George Mason University. She has served as president of the Texas Institute of Letters.

== Awards ==
- 1979–80 National Endowment for the Arts fellow

== Works ==
- Come Back, Lolly Ray (1977) – novel
- Emma Blue (1978) – novel
- Daddy's Girl (1981) – novel
- The Perfect Sonya (1987) – novel
- Breaking Gentle (1988) – novel
- Crossed Over: A Murder, A Memoir (1992), based in part on the story of Karla Faye Tucker
- The Track of Real Desires (1994) – novel
- Her Dream of Dreams: The Rise and Triumph of Madam CJ Walker (2002) – nonfiction
- Harriet Tubman: Imagining a Life (2007) – nonfiction
- Who Killed These Girls? (2016) – nonfiction
- Deer Creek Drive: A Reckoning of Memory and Murder in the Mississippi Delta (2022) – nonfiction
