= Lindsey Haun =

American actress, singer, and director (born 1984)

- Born: November 21, 1984 (age 41); Los Angeles, California, U.S.
- Occupations: Actress, musician, director
- Years active: 1991–present
- Known for: True Blood; The Color of Friendship; Broken Bridges

Lindsey Haun (born November 21, 1984) is an American actress, singer, and director. She is known for her role as Hadley on the HBO television series True Blood. She was nominated for a Young Artist Award for her role in the 2000 Disney Channel original movie The Color of Friendship as Mahree Bok, and has starred in the film Broken Bridges, for which she also recorded a portion of the soundtrack. She starred in and co-directed the 2023 comedy horror film Hanky Panky.

== Early life ==
Lindsey Haun was born on November 21, 1984. She is the daughter of Jimmy Haun, a guitarist who has recorded with the bands Yes and Circa. Through him, she is also the granddaughter of singer Rouvaun (Jim Haun). Her mother was a choreographer.

== Career ==
Haun started acting when she was three, in a commercial for Little Caesars. Her first television appearance was on an episode of Anything But Love, and her first notable film role was as Mara, the ruthless leader of the sinister children in 1995's Village of the Damned.

Haun also starred in the Emmy-winning Disney Channel original movie, The Color of Friendship in 2000, which was based on a true story; from there she continued her relationship with Disney as one of the Movie Surfers. She later appeared in ABC Family's Brave New Girl, a television film based on the book co-written by Britney Spears.

In 2006, she starred in the movie Broken Bridges with Toby Keith, and was also signed to his record label, Show Dog Nashville, to be their first "cross-over" artist. Haun is also featured on the movie's soundtrack.

That year, Haun also co-starred in the movie Rome and Jewel, a movie based on William Shakespeare's Romeo and Juliet, but set in Los Angeles and involving an interracial romance.

Haun is also a director of short films including a film which won Fearless Filmmaking Grand Prize in Slamdance Film Festival and another one starring Amanda Fuller.

== Filmography ==
=== Film ===
Year	Title	Role	Notes
1995	Village of the Damned	Mara Chaffee	
2006	Broken Bridges	Dixie Leigh Delton	
2007	Shrooms	Tara	
2008	Good Intentions	Erica	Short
2008	Rome & Jewel	Jewel	
2011	The Life Zone	Staci Horowitz	
2011	The Truth About Angels	Kate	
2013	House of Last Things	Kate	
2013	Ordained	Nancy	Short
2014	Hanky Panky	Rebecca (voice)	Short
2015	Mansions on the Moon: Heart of the Moment	Zee	Short
2015	Reset	Stephanie	Short
2015	Exquisite Corpse I		Short
2016	Exquisite Corps II		Short
2017	High and Outside	Heather	
2017	Meat Cute	Alice	Short
2018	6 Balloons	Meditation Podcast (voice)	
2023	Hanky Panky	Rebecca	

=== Television ===
Year	Title	Role	Notes
1991	Anything but Love		"Adventures in Babysitting"
1992	Camp Wilder	Lindsey	"Sophie's Birthday"
1993	Desperate Rescue: The Cathy Mahone Story	Lauren Mahone	TV film
1994	Deep Red	Gracie Rickman	TV film
1994	Diagnosis: Murder	Little Girl	"Nirvana"
1994	Children of the Dark	Jamie Harrison	TV film
1994	Melrose Place	Young Alison	"In Bed with the Enemy", "Till Death Do Us Part"
1994	Jack Reed: A Search for Justice	Laura	TV film
1995	Star Trek: Voyager	Beatrice Burleigh	"Learning Curve", "Persistence of Vision"
1996	3rd Rock from the Sun	Lisa	"Green-Eyed Dick"
1997	Get to the Heart: The Barbara Mandrell Story	Teenage Barbara Mandrell	TV film
1997	Star Trek: Voyager	Belle	"Real Life"
1997–98	The Tom Show	Amber	"Bad Publicity", "The Band"
1998	Addams Family Reunion	Jenny Adams	TV film
2000	The Color of Friendship	Mahree Bok	TV film
2001	100 Deeds for Eddie McDowd	Shelby	"Personal Trainer"
2002	Philly	Kelly Sarno	"There's No Business Like No Business"
2002	Malcolm in the Middle	Kristen	"Poker #2"
2004	Brave New Girl	Holly Lovell	TV film
2005	Center of the Universe	Megan	"Oh Brother, What the Hell Were You Thinking?"
2005	Alias	Miranda	"Prophet Five"
2006	7th Heaven	Maggie Hamilton	"The Magic of Gershwin"
2007	Without a Trace	Zoe Fuller	"Claus and Effect"
2008	Criminal Minds	Jordan Norris	"Elephant's Memory"
2008	Cold Case	Julie Reed (1978)	"Roller Girl"
2009–12	True Blood	Hadley Hale	Recurring role
2014	Graceland	Ramona	"Magic Number", "H-A-Double-P-Y"
2015	Such a Small World	Liss	TV series
2017	Bones	Tess Abbott	"The Grief and the Girl"
2025	Ballard	Meredith Haines	"BYOB"

== Other works ==
Year	Title	Notes
2010	The Four-Faced Liar	Special thanks
2012	The Haun Solo Project: Addicted	Composer, producer, special makeup effects artist, editor, writer, director
2013	Eva & Liza	Costume designer, producer, makeup artist, editor, writer
2014	Hanky Panky	Director
2015	Coming To	Writer, director
2015	Exquisite Corpse I	Director
2016	Flesh and Blood and Bone	Editor, writer, director
2016	Nanoblood	Director
2016	Exquisite Corps II	Director

== Discography ==
=== Singles ===
Year	Single	Peak positions	Album
Year	Single	US Country	Album
2005	"Stronger Than We Know"	—	Brave New Girl (soundtrack)
2006	"Broken"	52	Broken Bridges (soundtrack)
"—" denotes releases that did not chart

=== Music videos ===
Year	Video	Director
2006	"Broken"	Steven Goldmann
