= Crash Here Tonight =

Single by Toby Keith

from the album White Trash with Money
- Released: August 15, 2006
- Genre: Country
- Length: 3:01 (album version); 2:11 (Soundtrack version)
- Label: Show Dog Nashville
- Songwriter: Toby Keith
- Producers: Toby Keith, Lari White

Toby Keith singles chronology
"A Little Too Late" (2006)	"Crash Here Tonight" (2006)	"High Maintenance Woman" (2007)

"Crash Here Tonight" is a song written and recorded by American country music artist Toby Keith. It was released in August 2006 as the third and final single from Keith's album White Trash with Money. A shorter all-acoustic version of the song was featured on the soundtrack for Broken Bridges and was played by Keith in the movie. It peaked at number 15 on the United States Country Charts.

== Critical reception ==
Kevin John Coyne, reviewing the song for Country Universe, gave it a positive rating. He says that Keith has "never sounded better, and he’s finally recording adult and sophisticated material again."

== Music video ==
The music video was directed by Michael Salomon, and it premiered on CMT's Top 20 Countdown on August 31, 2006. It features actress Heather Locklear.

== Chart positions ==
Chart (2006)	Peak position
Canada Country (Billboard)	23
US Hot Country Songs (Billboard)	15
US Billboard Hot 100	96
