= Digital Bolex =

Digital camera model

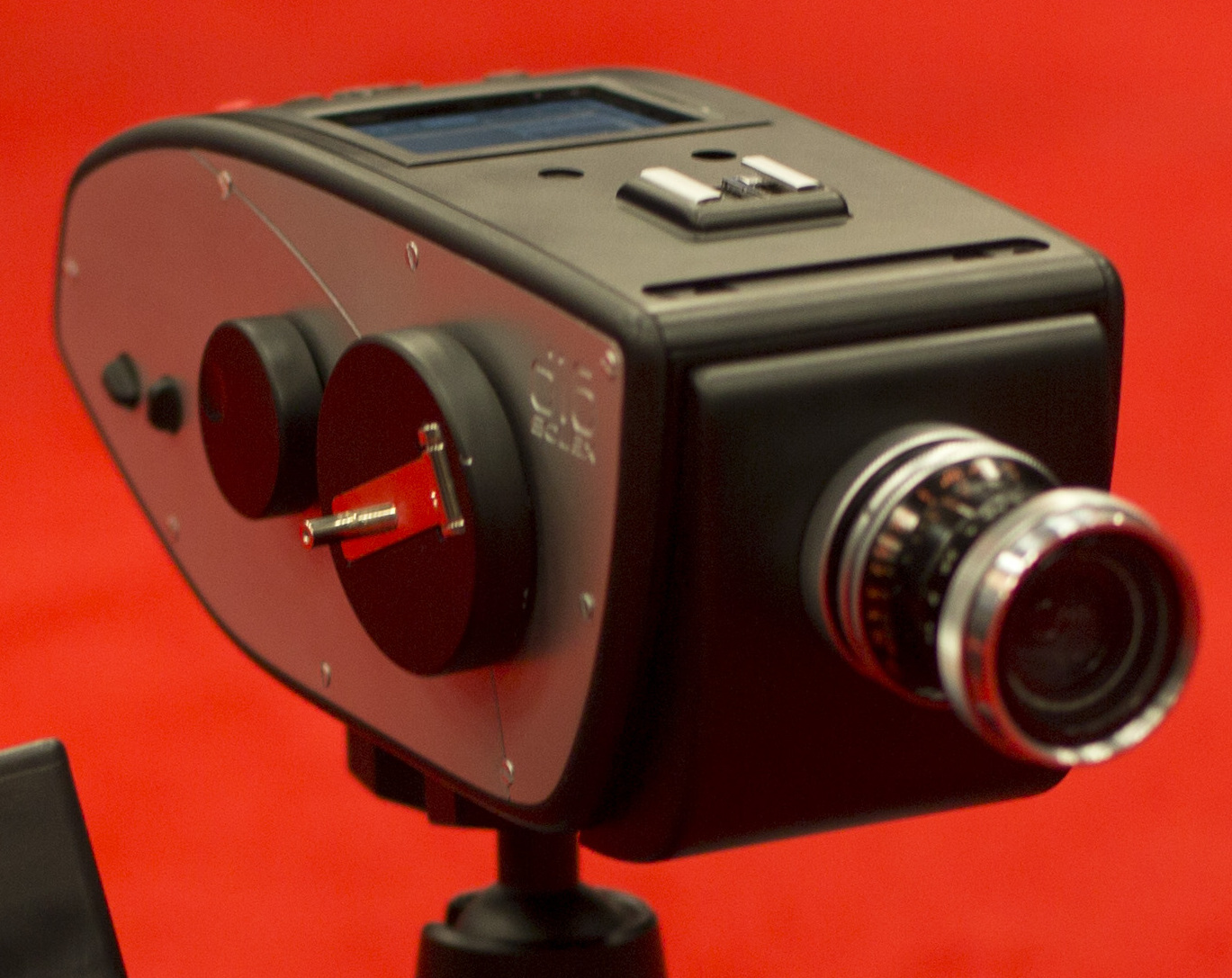
- D16 at SXSW 2013
- Manufacturer: Cinemeridian, Inc.
- Type: Digital cinema camera
- Released: March 12, 2012 (Kickstarter); December 16, 2013 (Retail)
- Introductory price: $3299 (256GB model) USD $3599 (500GB model) USD $3999 (Monochrome) USD
- Media: Adobe CinemaDNG
- Storage: 256 or 500 GB internal Solid State Drive or CF card
- Display: HDMI or SD Video
- Sound: 24-bit 96kHz AIFF
- Camera: 2048x1152 (2K) or 1920x1080 HD video
- Connectivity: USB 2.0 (for firmware upgrades); USB 3.0 (for connection to PC) phantom powered XLR (two) headphone SD video
- Power: Internal battery
- Dimensions: 3.6"H (91mm) x 3.3"W (84mm) x 7.8"D (199mm)
- Weight: 5 lbs
- Related: Bolex H16
- Website: www.digitalbolex.com

Digital Bolex was a partnership between Cinemeridian, Inc. and Ienso Canada, an engineering company, to develop the Digital Bolex D16 digital cinema camera. Development was funded via a successful Kickstarter in March 2012, raising $262,661.

On June 27, 2016, the company announced on its website that it would no longer be producing cameras as of that month, and would shut down its online store on June 30, 2016. The company website started showing the simple message "Maintenance mode is on" in June 2018, but has not yet been shut down as of January 2025, showing "Digital Bolex: Coming Soon".

== Company profile ==
Digital Bolex was headquartered in Downtown Los Angeles and Toronto, Canada. Cameras were designed and manufactured in Canada.

=== Name ===
In 2012, Cinemeridian licensed the named Bolex from Bolex International, the Swiss camera company that created the first consumer 16mm film camera, the H16, in 1927. The name Bolex is derived from that of its inventor, Jacques Bogopolsky. The Digital Bolex D16 is named after the H16.

== History (2011–present) ==
The Digital Bolex was initially developed as a side project of CEO Joseph Rubinstein's LA-based photo booth company Polite in Public. Rubinstein wanted to develop a video booth that would require a raw-capable video camera under $10,000. He decided to start a new company to pursue the endeavor in early 2011, and partnered with Canadian design firm Ienso in summer of 2011 to produce the first prototype camera.

In Fall of 2011, Rubinstein hired USC grad and filmmaker Elle Schneider to co-develop the camera. Both film school graduates, Schneider and Rubinstein collaborated on a short film entitled One Small Step to test their prototype. The film premiered at the Short Film Corner of the 2012 Cannes Film Festival.

Digital Bolex announced its camera at the 2012 SXSW Film Festival where it had a trade show booth. Unable to announce the licensing of the Bolex name before the event, they are listed in the festival catalog as Cinemeridian.

=== Kickstarter ===
Rubinstein and Schneider announced their collaboration with Bolex via the Kickstarter crowdfunding platform on March 12, 2012. Billed "the first affordable digital cinema camera", the project came to the attention of notable film bloggers Philip Bloom and Stu Maschwitz, and by the campaign's second day the $100,000 goal had been met. Within the first 48 hours the campaign exceeded $250,000 and the limited run of 100 cameras had been sold. Rubinstein and Schneider have said they purposely limited the number of cameras to 100 in order to avoid the manufacturing delays that had plagued other runaway crowdfunding successes.

As of December 2012, the Digital Bolex was one of the top 50 Kickstarter campaigns of all time, alongside the Oculus Rift, Double Fine Adventure, and Pebble watch, all of which were profiled by CNN Money for their late deliveries. The Digital Bolex had an original estimated delivery date of August 2012, and cameras began to ship in December 2013.

The Digital Bolex received a large amount of press in print and on the web during and after its launch, including stories by Mashable, Engadget, PBS, CNET, Vice and Intel's The Creator's Project, and Wired. With 440 backers and $262,661 raised, the Digital Bolex Kickstarter had an unusually high average pledge of $597, nearly twice the average pledge of similar Kickstarter project Oculus Rift ($256 average pledge) and four times the average pledge of the Ouya game console ($136). With 77 backers pledging $2,500 each, the Digital Bolex may have the highest median pledge of any Kickstarter project.

=== End of production June 2016 ===
On June 27, 2016, the company announced on its website that it would no longer be producing cameras as of that month, and would shut down its online store on June 30, 2016. After the company made the announcement the remaining 50 to 60 cameras sold out in just two days. Digital Bolex founder Joe Rubinstein has said there is a possibility for the product to be relaunched but it would require new investment.

== Products ==
=== D16 cinema camera ===
The Digital Bolex camera was the second camera to feature Adobe's CinemaDNG open RAW file format after the Swedish-made Ikonoskop which debuted in 2008. Both cameras use a Kodak-designed CCD sensor. The Digital Bolex D16 shoots raw still frames per second instead of a traditional video stream. In addition to its raw capabilities, the camera is notable for its Super 16mm sized sensor, allowing the usage of vintage 16mm lenses with no crop, and its unique crank wheel encoder. The Digital Bolex is the only digital cinema camera with a native C mount, a nod to the original Bolex 16mm film cameras.

The Digital Bolex was the first-announced camera aimed at the consumer market to offer a 2K recording resolution, however competitor Blackmagic Design started shipping its Blackmagic Cinema Camera (announced a month later at the 2012 National Association of Broadcasters convention in Las Vegas) in December 2012, one year before the Digital Bolex began to ship.

=== D16M monochrome ===
At the 2014 National Association of Broadcasters convention, Digital Bolex announced it would begin selling a monochrome cinema camera, the D16M.

The D16M is one of a few dedicated monochromatic cinema cameras developed in the last few years. Other monochrome cameras have been created by RED, Leica, and Ikonoskop. The first units shipped in July 2014.

=== Kish/Bolex Series 1 primes ===
Digital Bolex released its first series of lenses online in September 2014.

== Digital Bolex in use ==
The Digital Bolex has been used in mainstream film and television, including Netflix series Hemlock Grove, Fox series Glee, a Kelly Rowland music video directed by Spike Lee, and an Airbnb commercial directed by Bombay Beach filmmaker Alma Har'el. The comedy horror feature film Hanky Panky was shot entirely on the D16.

Rubinstein, Schneider, and the Digital Bolex are subjects in the documentary Beyond the Bolex, a biographical film about Bolex founder Jacques Bogopolsky (later anglicized to Bolsey), directed by his great-grand daughter Alyssa Bolsey.

== See also ==
- 16 mm film
- CinemaDNG
