= Handkerchief =

Piece of cloth for personal use

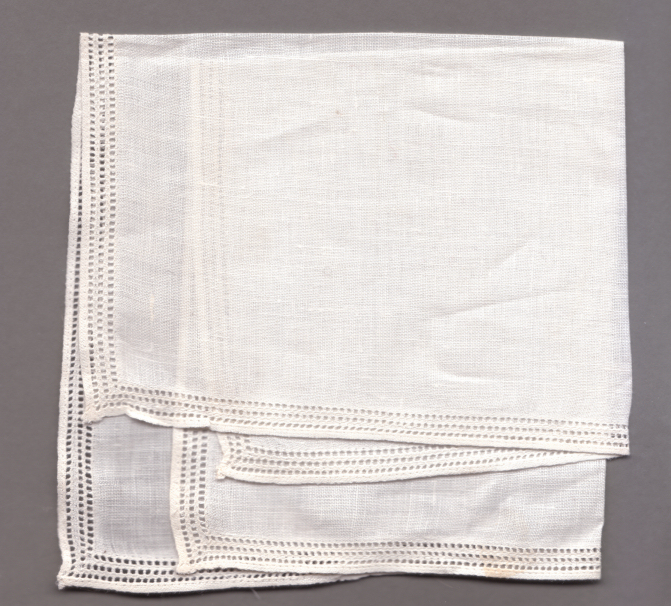
A linen handkerchief

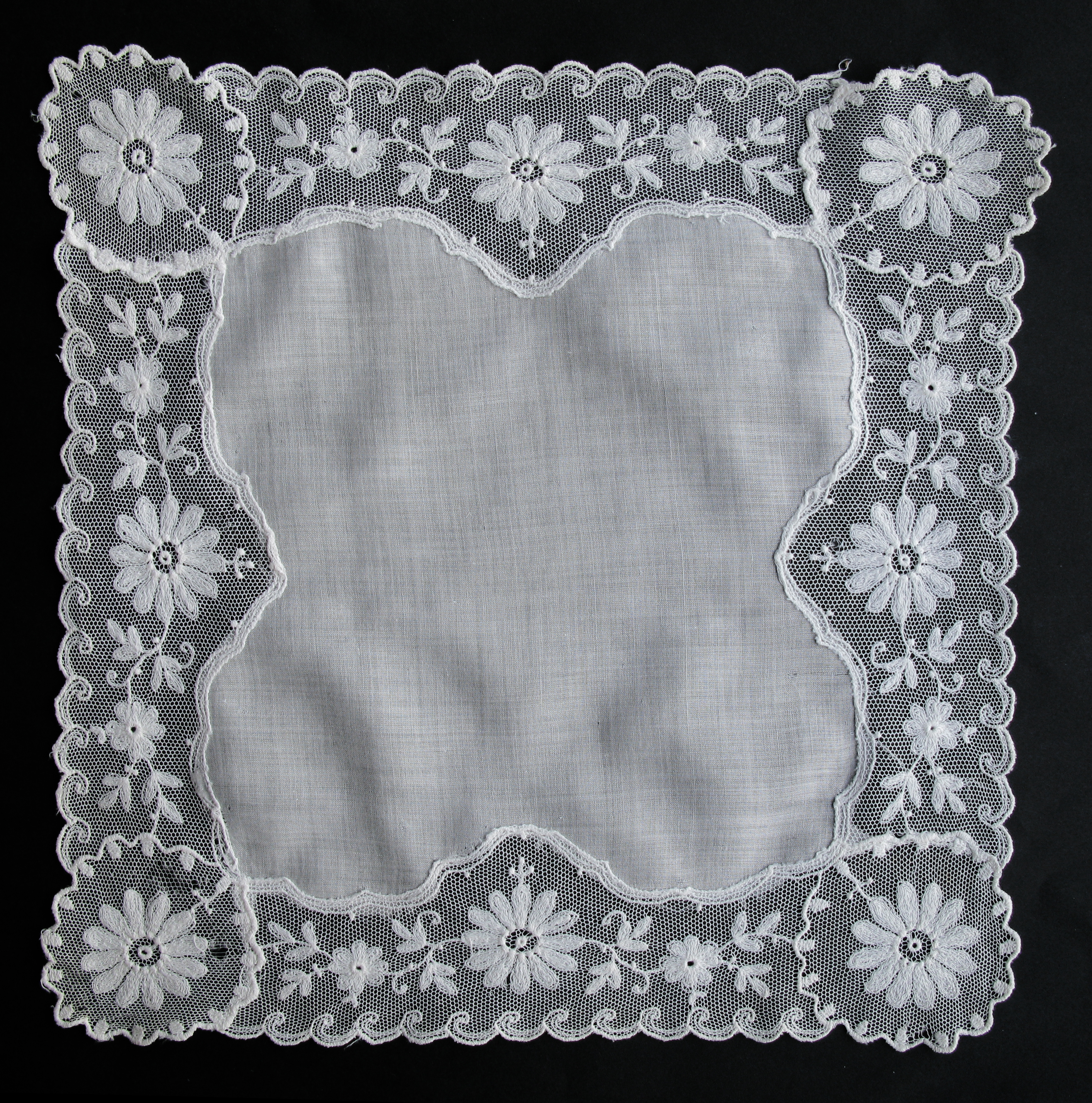
A lace handkerchief

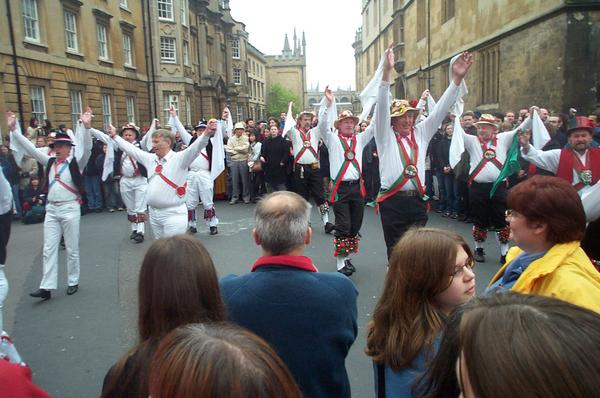
Morris dancers with handkerchiefs in Oxford

A handkerchief (/ˈhæŋkərtʃɪf/; also called a hankie or, historically, a handkercher or a fogle) is a form of a kerchief or bandanna, typically a hemmed square of thin fabric which can be carried in the pocket or handbag for personal hygiene purposes such as wiping one's hands or face, or blowing one's nose. A handkerchief is also sometimes used as a purely decorative accessory in the breast pocket of a suit; sometimes known as a pocket square. A handkerchief is also an important accessory in many folk-dances in many regions like the Balkans and the Middle East; an example of a folk-dance featuring handkerchiefs is the Greek Kalamatianós.

== Modern usage and how to use ==
The material of a handkerchief can be symbolic of the socio-economic class of the user, not only because some materials are more expensive, but because some materials are more absorbent and practical for those who use a handkerchief for more than style. Handkerchiefs can be made of cotton, cotton-synthetic blend, synthetic fabric, silk, or linen.

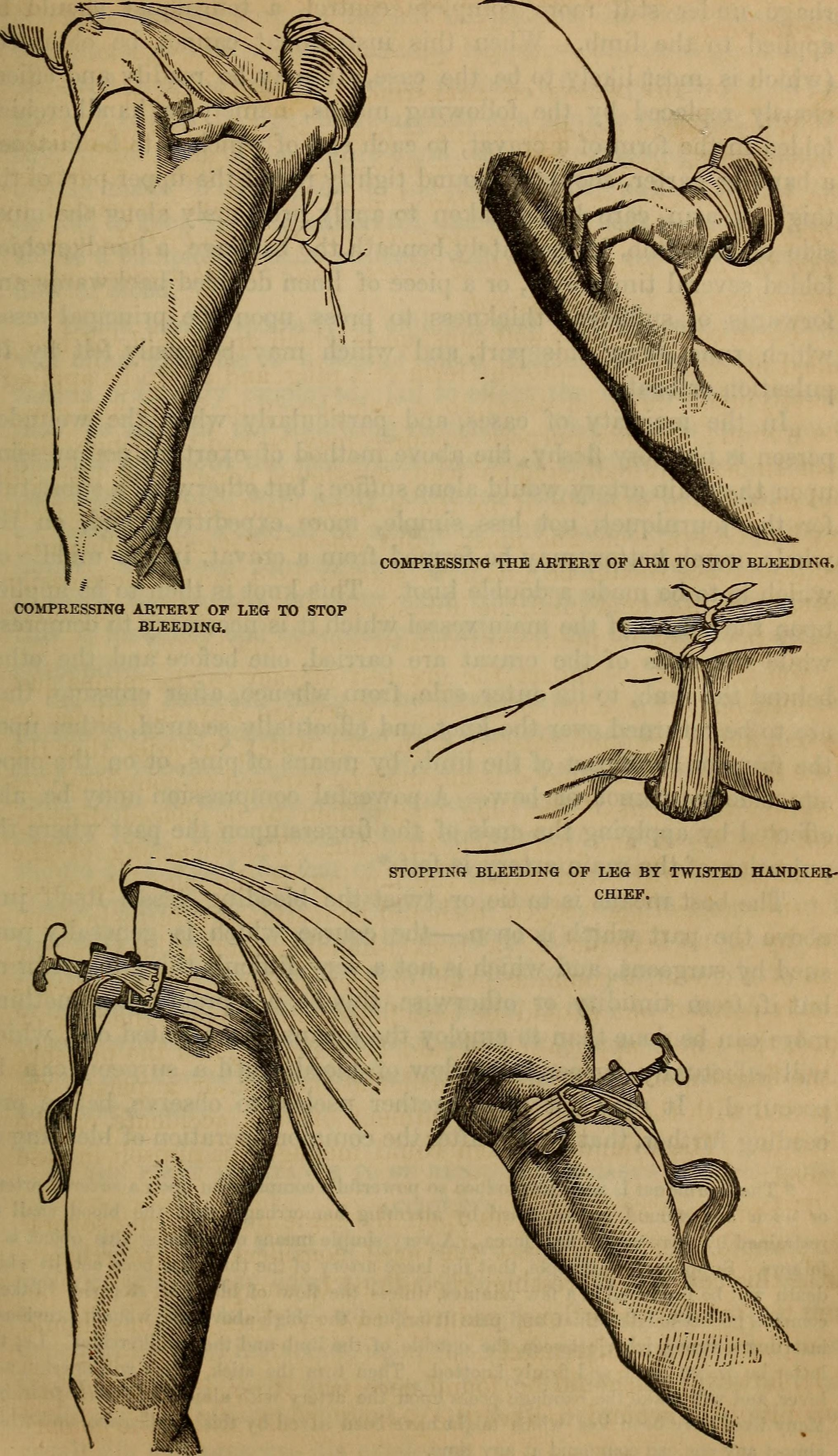
Handkerchief used for stopping bleeding

Handkerchiefs are also used as an impromptu way to carry around small items when a bag or basket is unavailable. They could also serve as a substitute for a bandage over a small injury. In the United Kingdom, the habit of wearing a handkerchief with tied corners on one's head at the beach has become a seaside postcard stereotype.

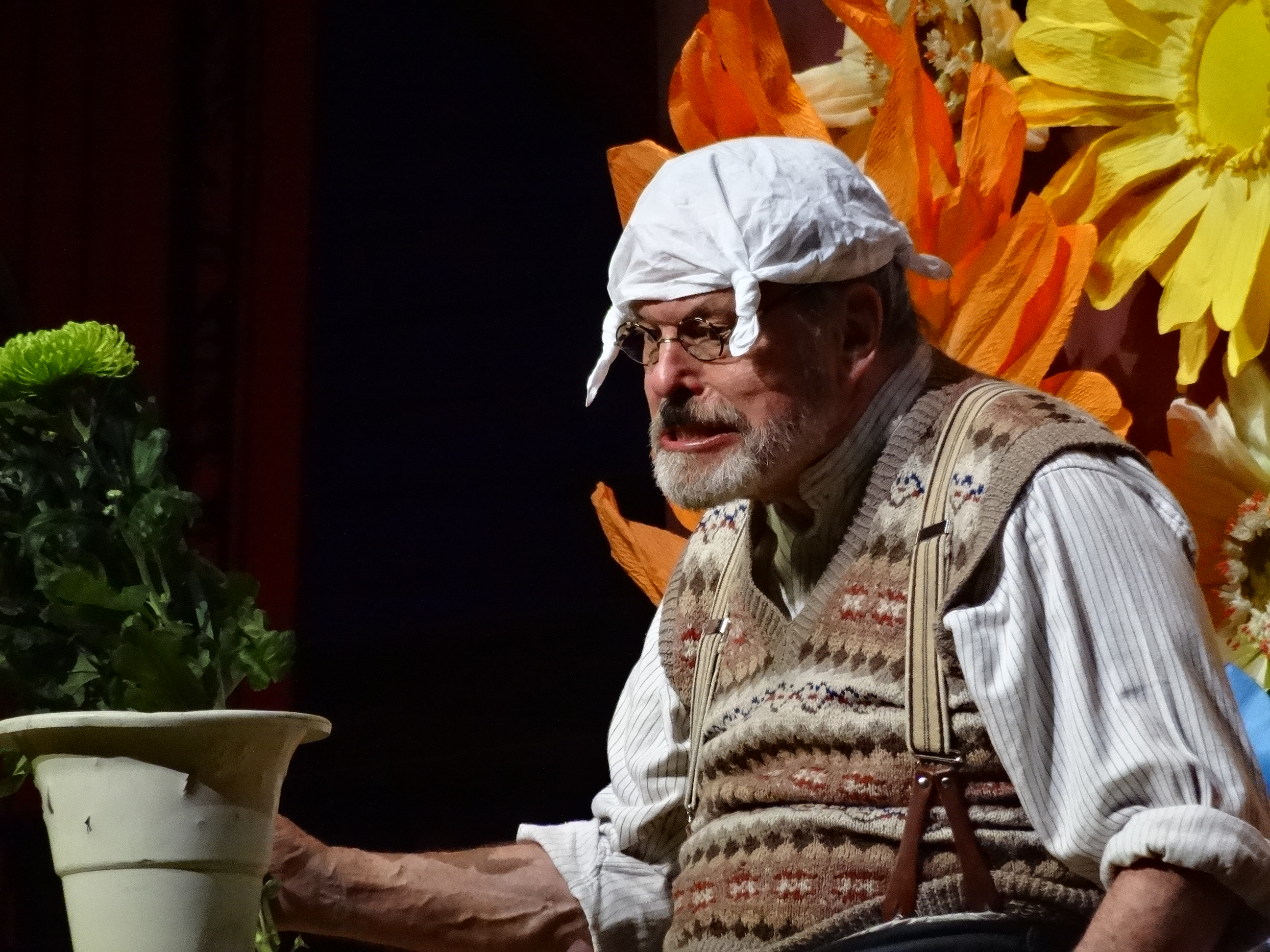
Knotted handkerchief hat

From the late 18th century white handkerchiefs were waved, generally by women (men usually waved their hats), to demonstrate approval at public events such as processions or political rallies.

Using handkerchiefs to accentuate hand movements while dancing is a feature of both West African and African-American traditional dance, in the latter case especially in wedding celebrations. Handkerchiefs are also traditional accoutrements in certain kinds of English folk dance, such as the Morris dance.

Besides their intended use, they could be used for cleaning equipment, polishing shoes, cleaning hands and face, signaling for attention, as a sweat band, neckerchief, as protection from dust inhalation, to repair footwear, cut out pieces to patch clothes, cut up as emergency firearms cleaning patches, Molotov cocktail wick (fire-bomb), hot cooking utensil holder, a makeshift bandage, tourniquet, or arm sling.

== Origin ==
In the times of ancient Greece and Rome, handkerchiefs were often used the way they are today.

The word handkerchief derives from the word kerchief which came from a French word: couvre-chef, which means "hat" or "headgear", so a handkerchief is a similar cloth in the hand rather than on the head.

In the 16th century, people in Europe began to carry kerchiefs in their pockets to wipe their foreheads or their noses. To distinguish this kind of kerchief from the one used to cover the head, the word "hand" was added to "kerchief". This was then preferred to wiping the nose on a sleeve.

King Richard II of England, who reigned from 1377 to 1399, is widely believed to have invented the cloth handkerchief, as surviving documents written by his courtiers describe his use of square pieces of cloth to wipe his nose. Certainly they were in existence by Shakespeare's time, and a handkerchief is an important plot device in his play Othello.

A handkerchief was sometimes used by Indian thugs: to take advantage of their victims, the thugs would join travellers and gain their confidence, which would allow them to surprise and strangle the travellers with a handkerchief or noose.

== Pocket square ==
Suits with pocket handkerchief

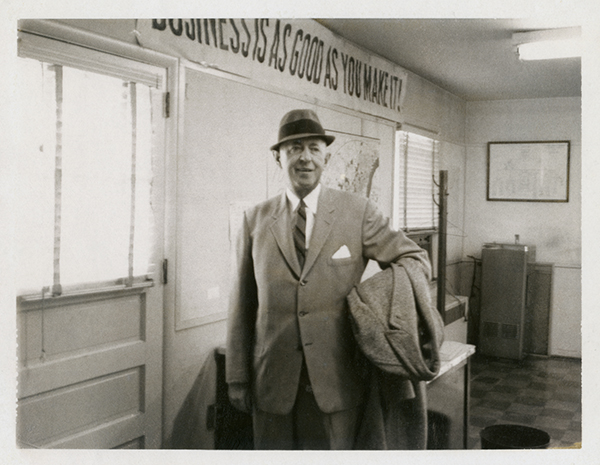
A businessman wearing a handkerchief c. 1965

In addition to carrying for practical purposes, handkerchiefs have long been displayed in the chest pocket of men's jackets. Used in this way, they are referred to as a pocket handkerchief or pocket square. The trend of pocket squares as a fashion accessory really started during the 1920s, and continued until the 1960s. During that period, actors such as Cary Grant, Fred Astaire and Gary Cooper wore them regularly. The pocket square subsequently fell into disuse until the late 2000s when it made a comeback thanks in part to popular television shows such as Mad Men.

Pocket squares are usually made in fabrics such as silk, cotton, linen or wool.

As a visible fashion item there are a wide variety of ways to fold a pocket square, ranging from the austere to the flamboyant:

- The Presidential, or Flat Fold, perhaps the simplest, is folded at right angles to fit in the pocket.
- The Winged Puff, a simple and elegant fold.
- The Puff or the Cooper is simply shaped into a round puff.
- The Reverse Puff, or The Crown Fold, is like the Puff, except with the puff inside and the points out, like petals.
- The Westo Four Point fold, the quickest way to achieve a four-point fold effect.
- The TV Fold looks similar but is folded diagonally with the point inside the pocket.
- The One-point Fold is folded diagonally with the point showing.
- The Two-point Fold is folded off-center so the two points do not completely overlap.
- The Three-point Fold is first folded into a triangle, then the corners are folded up and across to make three points.
- The Four-point Fold is an off-center version of the Three-point Fold.
- The Cagney is basically a backwards version of the Four-point Fold.
- The Astaire is a puff with a point on either side.
- The Straight Shell is pleated and then folded over to give the appearance of nested shells.
- The Diagonal Shell is pleated diagonally and then folded.

Although it is very common practice for weddings, proms, etc., many style authorities do not recommend wearing a matching (i.e., identical) pocket square and tie, as it tends to look contrived, draws attention away from the wearer's face, and displays sartorial uncertainty. Instead, the two items should coordinate without matching; for example, by matching a secondary color in the necktie's pattern to a secondary color in the pocket square's pattern.

== Rumāl ==
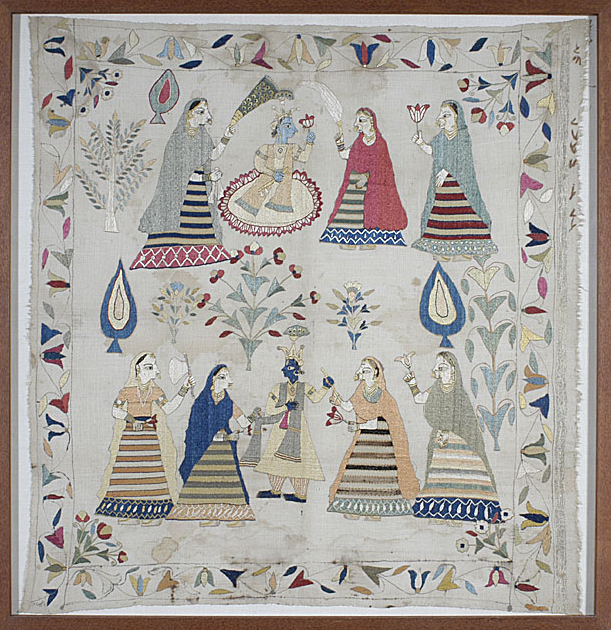
Rumāl with scenes of gopis worshiping Krishna. Late 18th to early 19th century, Chamba district, Himachal Pradesh, India. Ceremonial/ritual furnishing, silk embroidery on cotton. LACMA textile collection

A rumāl is a small loose piece of cloth, similar to a handkerchief used to cover the head by Sikh boys, sportspersons and other guests who visit a Gurdwara. In Sikhism, the rumal is held in the same regard as the turban.

=== Chamba Rumal ===
Chamba Rumal is an embroidered handicraft handkerchief of Chamba.

== In popular culture ==
The hero of 2023 comedy horror film Hanky Panky is a talking handkerchief named Woody.

== See also ==
- Napkin
- Sachet
- Facial tissue
- Antimacassar
- Dudou, sometimes described as a handkerchief blouse
- Handkerchief code
