= White Trash with Money =

Studio album by Toby Keith
- Released: April 11, 2006
- Genre: Country
- Length: 41:57
- Label: Show Dog Nashville
- Producers: Toby Keith; Lari White

Toby Keith chronology
Honkytonk University (2005)	White Trash with Money (2006)	Big Dog Daddy (2007)

Singles from White Trash With Money
- 1. "Get Drunk and Be Somebody" Released: December 20, 2005; 2. "A Little Too Late" Released: April 4, 2006; 3. "Crash Here Tonight" Released: August 15, 2006

White Trash with Money is the eleventh studio album by American country music artist Toby Keith, released on April 11, 2006, by Show Dog Nashville. It was Keith's first album for the label after DreamWorks Records went out of business. The album was distributed by Universal Music Group Nashville, the owner of Keith's catalog up to that point. The album shipped platinum, meaning one million or more units were distributed to outlets ahead of its release.

It features 12 tracks, including 3 "Bus songs". Keith wrote or co-wrote all of the songs; co-writing credits go to his longtime writing partner, his friend Scotty Emerick, with several tracks also being co-written by Dean Dillon. Keith co-produced the album with Lari White. Three singles were released from it: "Get Drunk and Be Somebody", "A Little Too Late" and "Crash Here Tonight", which reached #3, #2, and #15, respectively, on the Hot Country Songs charts, making this the first studio album of Keith's career since 1997's Dream Walkin' not to produce any number one hits.

== Critical reception ==
Professional ratings
Aggregate scores
Source	Rating
Metacritic	(67/100)
Review scores
Source	Rating
About.com	5/5 stars
AllMusic	4.5/5 stars
Billboard	(positive)
Blender	3/5 stars
E! Online	D
Entertainment Weekly	B
Los Angeles Times	2.5/4 stars
The New York Times	(favorable)
The Phoenix	2.5/4 stars
Rolling Stone	2.5/5 stars

White Trash with Money garnered positive reviews from music critics. At Metacritic, which assigns a normalized rating out of 100 to reviews from mainstream critics, the album received an average score of 67, based on 9 reviews.

Entertainment Weekly writer Chris Willman wrote that: "White Trash With Money — the first release on Keith's own label — might have even choicer cuts, but like the similarly indie-minded Prince, Keith is valuing prodigiousness over being a prodigy." Rolling Stone's Christian Hoard called the album "an arena-ready collection of jokey rockers and sad-cowboy ballads that's as immaculate and assembly-line sturdy as a new SUV." He concluded that: "Considering White Trash's standard-issue honky-tonk, he'll have to try a lot harder to provoke listeners outside of his fan base." Randy Lewis of the Los Angeles Times wrote that: "Keith is flexing creative muscles that hadn't gotten a lot of use before last year, so even though the results here are inconsistent, it feels like a prelude to something truly memorable." Werner Trieschman of The Phoenix praised Keith's "sly baritone" being utilized to deliver his "sharp humor" throughout the album, saying that: "White Trash won't win over any haters, but it argues that if Keith's an insensitive meathead redneck, he's at least an insensitive meathead redneck with tunes and a voice."

== Track listing ==
All tracks are written by Toby Keith, with additional co-writers as noted.

No.	Title	Writer(s)	Length
1.	"Get Drunk and Be Somebody"	Scotty Emerick	2:58
2.	"A Little Too Late"	Emerick; Dean Dillon	4:06
3.	"Can't Buy You Money"	Emerick	3:29
4.	"Crash Here Tonight"		3:00
5.	"Grain of Salt"	Emerick	3:11
6.	"I Ain't Already There"	Emerick; Dillon	3:40
7.	"Note to Self"	Emerick; Dillon	3:38
8.	"Too Far This Time"	Emerick; Dillon	3:22
9.	"Ain't No Right Way"	Emerick; Dillon	3:53
10.	"Brand New Bow"		3:25
11.	"Hell No"	Emerick	3:17
12.	"Runnin' Block"	Emerick	3:58
Total length:			41:57

== Personnel ==
Musicians

- Tim Akers - Hammond B-3 organ, keyboards, synthesizer
- Tom Bukovac - electric guitar
- Chris Carmichael - fiddle
- Glen Caruba - percussion
- Dan Dugmore - electric guitar, pedal steel guitar
- Chris Dunn - trombone
- Scotty Emerick - classical guitar
- Shannon Forrest - drums, cardboard box
- Kenny Greenberg - acoustic guitar
- Jim Horn - tenor saxophone
- John Barlow Jarvis - piano
- Wayne Killius - drum programming
- Randy Leago - baritone saxophone
- Phil Madeira - Hammond B-3 organ, National guitar, Dobro, accordion
- Steve Patrick - trumpet
- Glenn Worf - bass guitar
- Biff Watson - acoustic guitar
- Lari White - kazoo
- Jonathan Yudkin - fiddle

Backing vocalists

- Perry Coleman
- Scotty Emerick
- Jarrod Emmick
- Shannon Forrest
- Wes Hightower
- John Barlow Jarvis
- Biff Watson
- Lari White
- Glenn Worf

Technical

- George del Barrio - orchestral composition and arrangement, conductor
- Chuck Cannon - recording
- Aaron Chmielewski - recording assistant
- Jim Demain - mastering
- Peter Doell - engineering
- Adam Hatley - recording
- Jim Horn - horn composition and arrangement
- Toby Keith - producer
- Jason Lehning - recording
- Mills Logan - recording, mixing
- Marshall Morgan - mixing
- Joshua Muncy - recording assistant
- Roger Osborne - production assistant
- Charlie Paakkari - engineering assistant
- Aaron Shannon - editing
- Lari White - producer, recording, editing

== Charts ==
=== Weekly charts ===
Chart (2006)	Peak position
US Billboard 200	2
US Top Country Albums (Billboard)	2

=== Year-end charts ===
Chart (2006)	Position
US Billboard 200	43
US Top Country Albums (Billboard)	11
Chart (2007)	Position
US Top Country Albums (Billboard)	56

== Certifications ==
Region	Certification	Certified units/sales
United States (RIAA)	Platinum	1,000,000^{^}
^{^} Shipments figures based on certification alone.
