= Scotty Emerick =

American singer-songwriter (born 1973)

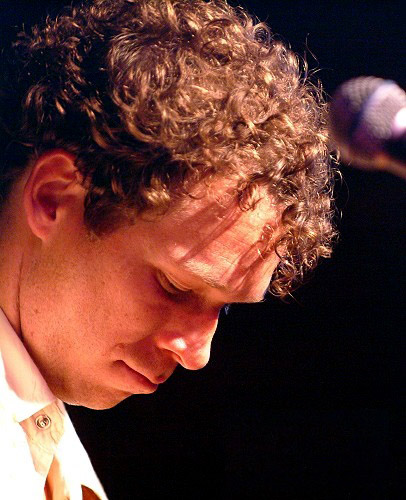
- Scotty Emerick at the Maverick Saloon in Santa Ynez, California.

Background information
- Born: Walter Scott Emerick; July 11, 1973 (age 52)
- Origin: Hollywood, Florida, United States
- Genres: Country
- Occupation: Singer-songwriter
- Instruments: Guitar, vocals, Piano, Mandolin
- Years active: 1993–present
- Labels: Rising Tide, DreamWorks Nashville, Show Dog Nashville, Big Machine
- Member of: Coral Reefer Band
- Website: www.scottyemerick.com

Walter Scott Emerick (born July 11, 1973, in Hollywood, Florida) is an American country music artist, known primarily for his work with Toby Keith. In addition to penning several of Keith's singles, Emerick has also written for Sawyer Brown, George Strait, Kenny Chesney and several other artists. In 2004, Emerick was named "Songwriter of the Year" by the Nashville Songwriters Association. He recorded an album, The Coast Is Clear, for DreamWorks Records in 2003, and has charted four singles on the country charts, including a No. 24-peaking duet with Keith, "I Can't Take You Anywhere", which Keith had previously recorded on his 2001 album Pull My Chain. "What's Up with That", performed by Emerick, was featured in the soundtrack to the film Broken Bridges. Emerick currently tours as a member of Jimmy Buffett’s Coral Reefer Band.

== Biography ==
Emerick is best known for his songwriting association with Toby Keith. Amongst his co-writing credits are the Number Ones "I'm Just Talkin' About Tonight," the Willie Nelson duet "Beer for My Horses," "I Love This Bar," "Whiskey Girl," and "As Good as I Once Was", as well as the Top Five hits "Get Drunk and Be Somebody" and "A Little Too Late." Emerick plays acoustic guitar and sings backing vocals, and as of April 2018, he is credited on 23 of Keith's releases.

As a musician, Emerick began his songwriting career in the mid-1990s, landing cuts by Sawyer Brown, including their Top 5 single "I Don't Believe in Goodbye", which he co-wrote with Bryan White. Emerick has also released four singles of his own, including the duet "I Can't Take You Anywhere", a collaboration with Keith originally recorded by the latter on his 2001 album Pull My Chain, and a debut album, The Coast Is Clear (2003), for DreamWorks Records Nashville. After the closure of DreamWorks' recording division, he signed to Keith's label, Show Dog Nashville.

Emerick was a frequent co-performer on Keith's national stadium and arena tours, as well as on his USO tours to US military bases in Germany, Afghanistan, and the Persian Gulf.

== Discography ==
=== Studio albums ===
Title	Album details
The Coast Is Clear	Release date: 2003; Label: DreamWorks

=== Singles ===
Year	Single	Peak chart positions		Album
Year	Single	US Country	US	Album
2003	"I Can't Take You Anywhere" (with Toby Keith)	24	91	The Coast Is Clear
2004	"The Coast Is Clear"	47	—	The Coast Is Clear
2004	"The Watch"	49	—	—
2006	"What's Up With That"	52	—	Broken Bridges soundtrack
"—" denotes releases that did not chart

=== Music videos ===
Year	Video	Director
2003	"I Can't Take You Anywhere"	Michael Salomon
2004	"The Coast Is Clear"	Michael Salomon
2004	"The Watch"	Michael Salomon
