= Terry Crews filmography =

American actor filmography

Terry Crews attending the 2017 San Diego Comic-Con

American actor Terry Crews is known for playing Julius Rock on the UPN/The CW sitcom Everybody Hates Chris, the Comedy Central revival Everybody Still Hates Chris, Sergeant/Lieutenant/Captain Terry Jeffords in the Fox/NBC sitcom Brooklyn Nine-Nine, and for his appearances in Old Spice commercials, as well as for roles in films such as the first three films of The Expendables franchise.

He also stars as Nick Kingston-Persons on the TBS sitcom Are We There Yet? and as himself on the BET reality series The Family Crews.

Crews is currently the host of the hit reality show America's Got Talent and has hosted its spin-offs America's Got Talent: The Champions, America's Got Talent: Extreme, and America's Got Talent: All-Stars.

== Film ==
Year	Title	Role(s)	Notes	Ref(s)
2000	The 6th Day	Vincent Bansworth		
2001	Training Day	Gang Member	Uncredited	
2002	Serving Sara	Vernon		
2002	Friday After Next	Damon		
2003	Deliver Us from Eva	Big Bartender		
2003	Malibu's Most Wanted	8 Ball		
2003	BAADASSSSS!	Big T	Alternative title: Gettin' The Man's Foot outta Your Baadasssss!	
2004	Soul Plane	Thug Flight Attendant		
2004	Starsky & Hutch	Porter		
2004	White Chicks	Latrell Spencer		
2005	The Longest Yard	Cheeseburger Eddy		
2005	Harsh Times	Darrell		
2006	Click	Singing Driver	Uncredited	
2006	The Alibi	Crazy Eight		
2006	The Benchwarmers	Steven		
2006	Puff, Puff, Pass	Cool Crush		
2006	Idiocracy	President Dwayne Elizondo Mountain Dew Herbert Camacho		
2006	Inland Empire	Street Person #3		
2007	Norbit	Big Black Jack Latimore		
2007	How to Rob a Bank	Officer DeGepse		
2007	Who's Your Caddy?	Tank		
2007	Balls of Fury	Freddy		
2008	Street Kings	Detective Terrence Washington		
2008	Get Smart	Agent 91		
2008	Get Smart's Bruce and Lloyd: Out of Control	Agent 91	Direct-to-DVD	
2009	Middle Men	James		
2009	Terminator Salvation	Captain Jericho		
2009	Gamer	Hackman		
2010	The Expendables	Hale Caesar		
2010	Lottery Ticket	Jimmy		
2011	Bridesmaids	Boot Camp Instructor	Cameo	
2012	The Expendables 2	Hale Caesar		
2013	Scary Movie 5	Martin		
2013	Cloudy with a Chance of Meatballs 2	Earl Devereaux	Voice; Replacing Mr. T from the first movie	
2014	The Single Moms Club	Branson		
2014	Reach Me	Wilson		
2014	Draft Day	Earl Jennings		
2014	Blended	Nickens		
2014	The Expendables 3	Hale Caesar		
2015	The Ridiculous 6	Chico		
2017	The Lego Batman Movie	Agent Smith	Voice, uncredited	
2017	Sandy Wexler	'Bedtime' Bobby Barnes		
2017	Where's the Money	Leon		
2018	Sorry to Bother You	Sergio		
2018	Deadpool 2	Jesse Aaronson / Bedlam		
2020	John Henry	John Henry		
2020	The Willoughbys	Commander Melanoff	Voice	
2021	Rumble	Tentacular	Voice	
2024	The Killer's Game	Lovedahl		
2026	Paw Patrol: The Dino Movie	Alistir Stonewall	Voice	

== Television ==
Year	Title	Role	Notes
1999	Battle Dome	T-Money	1 episode
2000	WCW Monday Nitro	T-Money	3 episodes
2002	The District	Atticus King	Episode: "Return of the King"
2004	CSI: Miami	Craig Waters	Episode: "Rap Sheet"
2005	My Wife and Kids	Darryl Scott	Episode: "Michael Joins a Gym"
2005	All of Us	Parker	Episode: "He-Male Trouble"
2005–2009	Everybody Hates Chris	Julius Rock	Main role, 88 episodes
2005–2007	The Boondocks	Various voices	Voice, 3 episodes
2009	Casseta & Planeta, Urgente!	Himself	1 episode
2010–2011	The Family Crews	Himself	17 episodes
2010–2012	Are We There Yet?	Nick Kingston-Persons	73 episodes
2011, 2014	American Dad!	Heinrich Brown, additional voices	Voice, 2 episodes
2012	The Newsroom	Lonny Church	5 episodes
2012	Stars Earn Stripes	Himself	Contestant
2013	Real Husbands of Hollywood	Himself	Episode: "Auf Weidersehen, Mitches"
2013	Second Generation Wayans	Mike Williams	Episode: "The Beginning of the End of the Beginning"
2013	Arrested Development	Herbert Love	5 episodes
2013	Hollywood Game Night	Himself	Contestant
2013–2014	Drunk History	Joe Louis, Donald DeFreeze	2 episodes
2013–2021	Brooklyn Nine-Nine	Terry Jeffords	Main role; 151 episodes
2014–2015	Who Wants to Be a Millionaire?	Himself (host)	176 episodes
2015–2016	Lip Sync Battle	2 episodes	
2017	Good Game	2 episodes	
2017	Ultimate Beastmaster	Himself (host)	10 episodes
2017	Do You Want to See a Dead Body?	Himself	Episode: "A Body and a Puddle"
2018	Portlandia	Border Guard Crews	Episode: "Riot Spray"
2019–2020	America's Got Talent: The Champions	Himself (host)	
2019–present	America's Got Talent	Himself (host)	Season 14–present
2019	Family Feud	Himself	Episode: "Chrissy Teigen & John Legend vs. Vanderpump Rules"
2020	Lego Masters	Himself	Episode: "Good Vs Evil"
2020	Helpsters	Amazing Atticus	Episode: "Amazing Atticus"
2020	Mapleworth Murders	Yoda	Episode: "The Final Chapter for Mrs. Mapleworth: Part 3"
2021	Side Hustle	Nedward	2 Episodes (his son - Isaiah Crews - is a main cast in this show)
2021–present	Tab Time	Randy Respect	Episode: "Good Manners"
2022	That's My Jam	Himself	1 episode
2022	America's Got Talent: Extreme	Himself (host)	
2022	Space Force	New Air Force Chief	
2022	Tales of the Walking Dead	Joe	Episode: "Evie / Joe"
2023	America's Got Talent: All-Stars	Himself (host)	
2023	Hot Wheels: Ultimate Challenge	Himself	Episode: "Cyber Slicker vs. Power Charged"
2024	America's Got Talent: Fantasy League	Himself (host)	
2024	Studio C	Various	Episode: "I'm So Sorry It Didn't Work Out with Terry Crews"
2024–2025	Everybody Still Hates Chris	Julius Rock	Voice, main role
2026	100 Cooks	Himself (host)	

== Video games ==
Year	Title	Role	Notes	Ref(s)
2012	The Expendables 2	Hale Caesar	Voice	
2013	Saints Row IV	Benjamin King	Voice	
2019	Crackdown 3	Commander Isaiah Jaxon	Voice and motion capture	
2025	Call of Duty: Black Ops 7	Himself	Voice	

== Web series ==
Year	Title	Role	Notes
2020–present	Danganronpa with Terry Crews and Isaiah	Himself, Monokuma, Makoto Naegi, Byakuya Togami, Kiyotaka Ishimaru, Mukuro Ikusaba, Sakura Ogami, Mondo Owada, Junko Enoshima, Aoi Asahina, Chihiro Fujisaki, Hifumi Yamada, Toko Fukawa, Genocide Jill	Voice

== Music ==
Year	Artist	Title	Album
1992	Lost Tribe	"Ms. Fortune"	Geared to Groove
2018	R+R=NOW	"The Night in Question"	Collagically Speaking

== Music videos ==
Year	Artist	Title	Role
2004	Blink-182	"Down"	Police Officer
2005	Bizarre	"Rockstar"	Extra
2005	Jamie Kennedy & Stu Stone	"Rollin' with Saget"	Bouncer
2013	Major Lazer (feat. Peaches & Timberlee)	"Scare Me"	Major Lazer
2015	Kendrick Lamar (feat. Bilal, Anna Wise & Thundercat)	"These Walls"	Unnamed
2017	Katy Perry (feat. Nicki Minaj)	"Swish Swish"	Coach Terry
2018	Muse	"Pressure"	Principal
2018	Muse	"Algorithm"	Principal
2019	Brittany Howard	"Stay High"	Factory Worker
2023	Tyler Hubbard	"Dancin’ In The Country"	Biker

== Theme park attractions ==
Year	Title	Role	Venue	Ref.
2022	Guardians of the Galaxy: Cosmic Rewind	Centurion Tal Marik	Epcot	
