= I Like Girls That Drink Beer =

Single by Toby Keith

from the album Hope on the Rocks
- Released: July 30, 2012
- Genre: Country
- Length: 2:49 (Main version); 2:43 (Radio version)
- Label: Show Dog-Universal Music
- Songwriters: Toby Keith; Bobby Pinson
- Producer: Toby Keith

Toby Keith singles chronology
"Beers Ago" (2012)	"I Like Girls That Drink Beer" (2012)	"Hope on the Rocks" (2012)

"I Like Girls That Drink Beer" is a song recorded by American country music singer Toby Keith and co-written with Bobby Pinson. It was released in July 2012 and is the first single from his album Hope on the Rocks, released on October 30, 2012.

== Content ==
Matt Bjorke of Roughstock.com states that the chorus of this uptempo break-up song, "feels distinctly country and what's good about it is that it's a song that's not really about beer. The hook "I like girls that drink beer" is more about finding a down to earth, regular woman instead of a high society, high-maintenance woman.” He goes on to say that, "Clearly contemporary, the song still has loads of fiddle, audible steel guitars and a downright country melody that makes it one of the most 'traditional' sounding songs to hit country radio."

== Critical reception ==
Billy Dukes of Taste of Country rates the song 3.5 stars out of 5. He states, "the new song – presumably from an upcoming album — is closer to the 2003 hit ‘I Love This Bar’ than it is ‘Red Solo Cup’ or ‘Beers Ago.’ All of his best bar room cuts (including ‘Whiskey Girl’ and ‘As Good as I Once Was’) work because Keith sounds like he could easily fill in for Norm on ‘Cheers,’ albeit a more gruff and successful version of the famous television character."

Kevin John Coyne of Country Universe gave the song an A. Coyne states that this song is, "An awesome throwback that recalls the great class-crossed lovers anthems without borrowing too heavily from them." He goes on to say, "...Keith isn’t just one of the genre’s greatest singers and songwriters. He’s also one of its smartest. When he’s at his best, we get songs that celebrate the working man and the country boy without a whiff of condescension or pandering." He ends with saying, "This is Toby Keith at his best."

== Music video ==
The music video was directed by Michael Salomon and premiered on September 7, 2012. It was filmed at a concert in San Bernardino, California and features a cameo from Guy Fieri.

The video features Keith and his band—including a small brass band—performing the song. Keith begins by playing along with his guitar prior to dispensing with the charade and putting it behind his back as he holds a beer instead while he sings. The video highlights several women enjoying both the song and their own beers. A slew of homemade signs are depicted in the audience that reference the title, including multiple ones misstating the name of the song as "I Like Girls Who Drink Beer".

== Chart performance ==
"I Like Girls That Drink Beer" debuted at number 28 on the US Billboard Hot Country Songs chart for the week of August 11, 2012, Keith's second-best debut behind "Stays in Mexico", which debuted at number 27 in August 2004. It also debuted at number 86 on the Canadian Hot 100 chart and debuted at number 18 on the US Billboard Bubbling Under Hot 100 chart for the same week of August 11, 2012.

Chart (2012)	Peak position
Canada Country (Billboard)	30
Canada Hot 100 (Billboard)	86
US Bubbling Under Hot 100 Singles (Billboard)	2
US Country Airplay (Billboard)	17
US Hot Country Songs (Billboard)	18

=== Year-end charts ===
Chart (2012)	Position
US Country Songs (Billboard)	74
