= Bullets in the Gun (song) =

Single by Toby Keith

from the album Bullets in the Gun
- Released: September 27, 2010
- Recorded: 2010
- Genre: Country
- Length: 4:16 (album version); 3:30 (radio edit)
- Label: Show Dog-Universal Music
- Songwriters: Toby Keith; Rivers Rutherford
- Producer: Toby Keith

Toby Keith singles chronology
"Trailerhood" (2010)	"Bullets in the Gun" (2010)	"Somewhere Else" (2011)

"Bullets in the Gun" is a song co-written and recorded by American country music artist Toby Keith. It was released in September 2010 as the second single and title track from his 2010 album of the same name. The song peaked at number 12 on the US Billboard Hot Country Songs chart. Keith co-wrote the song with Rivers Rutherford.

== Critical reception ==
Juli Thanki of Engine 145 gave the song a "thumbs up", saying that Keith's vocals had "nearly tangible bravado". Randy Lewis of the Los Angeles Times called the song "cinematic" and compared it to Marty Robbins's "El Paso". Reviewing for The New York Times, Jon Caramanica called the song "a pumped-up and comically desperate tale" and "almost parodic". Matt Bjorke of Roughstock gave the song a positive review, saying that it was Keith's best single in a decade. He also called it "a fantastic reminder of how a strongly lyrical song can take us places and into a movie in our minds." Bjorke also said that "even if you don’t condone the fictional story being told, it’s still a damn good song with a melody which suits the lyric perfectly."

== Controversy ==
In January 2011, Emily Robison of the Dixie Chicks stated during a video chat that she thought the song resembled Robert Earl Keen's "The Road Goes on Forever". Robert Earl Keen observed the same thing, saying, "But you know what they say about people from Oklahoma: They'll steal your hat and help you look for it." In fact, he specifically aimed his song "The Road Goes on and On" at Keith to criticize him.

== Music video ==
Michael Salomon directed the song's music video. It stars Danielle Vasinova and Chad Bannon.

== Chart performance ==
"Bullets in the Gun" debuted at number 37 on the Hot Country Songs chart dated for the week ending 9 October 2010. It also debuted at number 97 on the U.S. Billboard Hot 100 chart for the week of 20 November 2010.

Chart (2010–2011)	Peak position
Canada Country (Billboard)	21
US Hot Country Songs (Billboard)	12
US Billboard Hot 100	83

=== Year-end charts ===
Chart (2011)	Position
US Country Songs (Billboard)	69

== Certifications ==
Region	Certification	Certified units/sales
United States (RIAA)	Gold	500,000^{‡}
^{‡} Sales+streaming figures based on certification alone.
