= Clancy's Tavern =

Studio album by Toby Keith
- Released: October 25, 2011
- Genre: Country
- Length: 38:14 (Standard Edition); 54:31 (Deluxe Edition)
- Label: Show Dog-Universal Music
- Producer: Toby Keith

Toby Keith chronology
Bullets in the Gun (2010)	Clancy's Tavern (2011)	Hope on the Rocks (2012)

Singles from Clancy's Tavern
- 1. "Made in America" Released: June 13, 2011; 2. "Red Solo Cup" Released: October 10, 2011; 3. "Beers Ago" Released: March 12, 2012

Clancy's Tavern is the seventeenth studio album by American country music artist Toby Keith. It was released on October 25, 2011, by Show Dog-Universal Music. Lead-off single "Made in America" was released on June 13, 2011, reaching number one on the country charts in October 2011. Clancy's Tavern draws its name from the title track, which Keith wrote about his grandmother's bar in Fort Smith, Arkansas. A deluxe edition of the album includes four cover songs recorded live at a small venue in New York City.

== Reception ==
=== Commercial ===
Clancy's Tavern debuted at number 5 of the US Billboard 200, and at the top of the US Billboard Top Country Albums chart. As of the chart dated January 7, 2012, the album has sold 318,000 copies in the US.

=== Critical ===
Professional ratings
Aggregate scores
Source	Rating
Metacritic	(79/100)
Review scores
Source	Rating
About.com	3.5/5 stars
Allmusic	4/5 stars
Billboard	(favorable)
The Boston Globe	(positive)
Entertainment Weekly	B+
Los Angeles Times	2.5/4 stars
Roughstock	4/5 stars
Slant Magazine	2.5/5 stars
Taste of Country	4.5/5 stars
USA Today	3.5/4 stars

Clancy's Tavern by Toby Keith received mostly positive reviews from music critics. At Metacritic, which assigns an averaged rating out of 100 to reviews from mainstream critics, the album received an average score of 79, based on 6 reviews. About.com's Robert Silva stated that "If you bought the Deluxe Edition of Clancy's Tavern, it wasn't a complete waste of money", and affirmed that "This dude rocks. And I am very confused." AllMusic's Stephen Thomas Erlewine took note of that when compared to Keith's previous album, Bullets in the Gun (released in 2010), Clancy's Tavern "pushes humor to the forefront and generally isn’t so insistent on driving the beat into arena country territory, letting the melodies and music relax." He continues by stating that Keith is no longer at the height of his career and that "he’s now the guy he sang about being on “As Good as I Once Was." However, toward the end of the review, Erlewine commended Keith for delivering one of his best albums in "many a moon." Randy Lewis of the Los Angeles Times noted that "Like the corner bar, this is familiar territory for Keith and his fans, and he doesn’t seem to give a whit about stepping out of his comfort zone. That makes this an eminently dependable outing that’s strong on solidly crafted, confidently delivered songs but nearly devoid of surprises or revelations about his artistry." Roughstock's Matt Bjorke found that "as almost all singers are, to entertain us, not to enlighten us but if something enlightening happens to come along, all the better but remember this: don’t expect too much from him and he won't let you down, which is exactly what happens with Clancy’s Tavern. It’s a strong collection of songs that may be his best album in years". Slant Magazine's Jonathan Keefe criticized "Clancy's Tavern is a fairly rote reiteration of the same album that Toby Keith has been re-recording once a year since 2005's Honkytonk University. While there's something to be said for his work ethic and relative dependability, a good-sized chunk of Clancy's Tavern feels phoned in, and Keith is simply too big a personality and too dynamic a singer to get away with something lackadaisical. It's unfortunate that the couple of brighter moments on the album happen to be counterbalanced by some genuinely gross songs that play into the worst stereotypes about both Keith and country music as a whole." Taste of Country's Billy Dukes found that "'Clancy’s Tavern' is as humble a Toby Keith album as one can remember. There isn’t a moment to be found where it feels like the singer is standing over you thumping his chest. This is a welcome change of pace from a man who at age 50 shows no signs of losing touch with what’s hot." Brian Mansfield of the USA Today surmised that "Other than the opening Made in America, Keith seems to have worked through the ultra-patriotic anthems and macho declarations that have been staples of his recent albums. That leaves plenty of room to sing about bars and the people who haunt them. Keith's got an affinity for the subject, whether it's a character sketch like the title track or a drinking ditty like Red Solo Cup."

== Track listing ==
No.	Title	Writer(s)	Length
1.	"Made in America"	Toby Keith; Bobby Pinson; Scott Reeves	3:13
2.	"I Need to Hear a Country Song"	Keith; Bob DiPiero; Rivers Rutherford	3:08
3.	"Clancy's Tavern"	Keith; Scotty Emerick	3:49
4.	"Tryin' to Fall in Love"	Keith; Pinson	2:37
5.	"Just Another Sundown"	Keith; Pinson	2:49
6.	"Beers Ago"	Keith; Pinson	3:28
7.	"South of You"	Keith; Eddy Raven	3:40
8.	"Club Zydeco Moon"	Keith; Raven	3:14
9.	"I Won't Let You Down"	Keith	5:14
10.	"Red Solo Cup"	Brett Beavers; Jim Beavers; Brad Warren; Brett Warren	3:43
11.	"Chill-Axin'"	Keith; Emerick	3:16
Total length:			38:11

Deluxe Edition
No.	Title	Writer(s)	Length
12.	"High Time (You Quit Your Low Down Ways) (Live)"	Billy Ray Reynolds	3:29
13.	"Truck Drivin' Man (Live)"	Terry Fell	4:04
14.	"Shambala (Live)"	Daniel Moore	4:07
15.	"Memphis (Live)"	Chuck Berry	4:40
Total length:			54:31

== Personnel ==
Adapted from liner notes.

- Brett Beavers - bass guitar (track 10), background vocals (track 10)
- Jim Beavers - six-string banjo (track 10), background vocals (track 10)
- Tom Bukovac - electric guitar (track 9)
- Pat Bergeson - harmonica (tracks 8, 9)
- Perry Coleman - background vocals
- Chad Cromwell - drums
- Eric Darken - percussion
- Paul Franklin - steel guitar (tracks 8, 9)
- Kevin "Swine" Grantt - bass guitar
- Kenny Greenberg - electric guitar
- Aubrey Haynie - fiddle (tracks 2–7, 11), mandolin (tracks 2–7, 11)
- Jim Hoke - saxophone (track 9), horn arrangements (track 9)
- Bill Huber - trombone (track 9)
- Scotty Huff - trumpet (track 9)
- Charlie Judge - accordion (tracks 3, 8)
- Toby Keith - lead vocals
- Phil Madeira - B-3 organ (track 9)
- Rob McNelley - electric guitar (tracks 2, 7)
- Steve Nathan - B-3 organ (tracks 1, 2, 4, 5, 7, 11), piano (tracks 1, 2, 4, 5, 7, 11), Wurlitzer (tracks 1, 2, 4, 5, 7, 11)
- Russ Pahl - steel guitar (tracks 1–3, 6, 7, 11)
- Michael Rhodes - bass guitar (track 9)
- Mica Roberts - background vocals (tracks 2, 3, 7, 8)
- Ilya Toshinsky - acoustic guitar, banjo, mandolin
- Brad Warren - acoustic guitar (track 10), background vocals (track 10)
- Brett Warren - acoustic guitar (track 10), background vocals (track 10)
- Biff Watson - acoustic guitar (tracks 1, 4–7)

== Charts ==
=== Weekly charts ===
Chart (2011)	Peak position
US Billboard 200	5
US Top Country Albums (Billboard)	1

=== Year-end charts ===
Chart (2011)	Position
US Top Country Albums (Billboard)	52
Chart (2012)	Position
US Billboard 200	52
US Top Country Albums (Billboard)	13

== Certifications ==
Region	Certification	Certified units/sales
United States (RIAA)	Platinum	1,000,000^{‡}
^{^} Shipments figures based on certification alone.
