= Hope on the Rocks =

Studio album by Toby Keith
- Released: October 30, 2012
- Genre: Country
- Length: 31:33
- Label: Show Dog-Universal Music
- Producer: Toby Keith

Toby Keith chronology
Clancy's Tavern (2011)	Hope on the Rocks (2012)	Drinks After Work (2013)

Singles from Hope on the Rocks
- 1. "I Like Girls That Drink Beer" Released: July 30, 2012; 2. "Hope on the Rocks" Released: November 5, 2012

Hope on the Rocks is the eighteenth studio album by the American country music artist Toby Keith. It was released on October 30, 2012 by Show Dog-Universal Music. The first single released from the album was "I Like Girls That Drink Beer". The album's second single was the title track, "Hope on the Rocks". In October 2013, the album had sold 300,000 copies in the US.

== Critical reception ==
Professional ratings
Aggregate scores
Source	Rating
Metacritic	(71/100)
Review scores
Source	Rating
AllMusic	4/5 stars
American Songwriter	3/5 stars
Country Weekly	4/5 stars
Los Angeles Times	2.5/4 stars
Music Is My Oxygen Weekly	3.5/5 stars
Roughstock	4/5 stars
Taste of Country	2/5 stars
USA Today	2.5/4 stars

Hope on the Rocks received mostly positive reviews from music critics. At Metacritic, which assigns an averaged score out of 100 to reviews from mainstream critics, the album received an average score of 71, based on five reviews. AllMusic's Stephen Thomas Erlewine called the effort "a satisfying set of strong songs". Jewly Hight of American Songwriterwrote that "Beer and partying once again play starring roles on Hope On The Rocks", but that it "comes off as rather objectifying". Joseph Hudak of Country Weekly wrote that the album showed "maturity" over Keith's past works. Randy Lewis of the Los Angeles Times surmised that "Keith has clearly become a skilled listener, a vital trait for any songwriter — or bartender." Music Is My Oxygen Weekly's Rob Burkhardt found, "Taken together, Hope On the Rocks, while perhaps a tad predictable, still contains the basic building blocks that have helped Toby Keith achieve the success he has today: not just the celebration of booze, but the making of great music, as well." Roughstock's Matt Bjorke wrote that "Hope On The Rocks is a lean 10 track collection and for my money, it's a great mixture of classic Toby Keith sounds", which the album seems "never over-produced or feeling like a record that was made to just be a couple radio singles and filler." He called it a "cohesive album and ranks right up there with Toby's best". Taste of Country's Billy Dukes criticized Hope on the Rocks as "a loud and sudsy collection of songs about beer, barrooms, heartbreak… and beer. Much like a Saturday night out at your favorite watering hole, it's rowdy and fun, but difficult to remember the next morning." Brian Mansfield of USA Today found that "Most of Keith's latest is a brawny drinker's paradise of horndogs, truckers and whiskey-running outlaws. But those shouldn't distract from its brooding country-pop, especially when Keith flaunts his inner Orbison on the title track".

== Track listing ==
No.	Title	Writer(s)	Length
1.	"Hope on the Rocks"	Toby Keith	3:39
2.	"The Size I Wear"	Keith; Rivers Rutherford	3:00
3.	"Scat Cat"	Keith; Rutherford	2:55
4.	"I Like Girls That Drink Beer"	Keith; Bobby Pinson	2:47
5.	"Get Got"	Keith; Pinson	3:45
6.	"Haven't Had a Drink All Day"	Keith; Pinson	2:33
7.	"Haven't Seen the Last of You"	Keith; Pinson	3:16
8.	"Cold Beer Country"	Keith; Marc Fortney; Pinson	3:15
9.	"Missed You Just Right"	Keith; Pinson	3:39
10.	"You Ain't Alone"	Keith; Scotty Emerick	2:44
Total length:			31:33

Deluxe edition
No.	Title	Writer(s)	Length
11.	"Red Solo Cup" (Johnny Mac remix)	Brett Beavers; Jim Beavers; Brad Warren; Brett Warren	3:28
12.	"Beers Ago" (Jason Nevins remix)	Keith; Pinson	4:45
13.	"Whiskey Girl" (live)	Keith; Emerick	4:17
14.	"Get Out of My Car" (live)	Keith; Pinson	5:22

== Personnel ==
- Perry Coleman - background vocals
- Chad Cromwell - drums
- Eric Darken - percussion, tambourine
- Scotty Emerick - gut string guitar
- Kevin "Swine" Grantt - bass guitar
- Kenny Greenberg - electric guitar
- Aubrey Haynie - fiddle
- Steve Hermann - trumpet
- Jim Hoke - clarinet, dobro, harmonica, saxophone
- Charlie Judge - accordion, Hammond B-3 organ, synthesizer
- Toby Keith - lead vocals
- Brent Mason - electric guitar
- Rob McNelley - electric guitar
- Steve Nathan - Hammond B-3 organ, piano, synthesizer
- Russ Pahl - electric guitar, steel guitar, jews harp, lap steel guitar
- Mica Roberts - background vocals
- Ilya Toshinsky - acoustic guitar, resonator guitar, mandolin

== Chart performance ==
=== Weekly charts ===
Chart (2012)	Peak position
US Billboard 200	6
US Billboard Top Country Albums	3

=== Year-end charts ===
Chart (2012)	Position
US Billboard Top Country Albums	62

Chart (2013)	Position
US Top Country Albums (Billboard)	36
