= Chad Bannon =

American actor

- Born: Chad Bannon; November 13, 1970 (age 56); Denver, Colorado
- Occupations: Film, television actor, martial artist
- Years active: 1993 - present

Chad Bannon (born November 13, 1970), also credited as Chad Ullery, is an American television and movie actor. Standing 6’4” and weighing 250 pounds, he is best known for his role as Killer Karl in House of 1000 Corpses and playing D.O.A. on the sports entertainment program "Battle Dome". He also competed as a professional kickboxer and mixed martial artist.

== Modeling and acting ==
Bannon landed the cover of Advocate Men's October 1995 issue. He modeled for celebrated male nude photographer Jim French in 1995 under the name of Dusty Manning, appearing in B+W Photoset J49 of ten images, and Color Photosets CP338 and CP339 of six images each. These and other contemporaneous photos were used subsequently in a number of high-quality Jim French and Colt Studio publications, including SPURS Magazine #25 [1997], the Jim French Annual Man Calendar 1997, the Jim French Annual Man Desk Calendar 1997, Colt Leather Calendar 1997, Colt Leather Calendar 1998, Colt Leather Calendar 2000, Colt Studio Presents Magazine #21 [2000], Colt Butt Beautiful Calendar 2002, and the second of the two Colt Studio 35th Anniversary Albums. He made his acting debut in the Chi Chi LaRue-directed erotic film Behind the Barn Door playing the love interest of Bo Summers. Bannon then starred in independent horror comedy film Kill Madonna and eventually landed roles in major motion pictures like Planet of the Apes and House of 1000 Corpses. Chad has also been mentioned numerous times on the Joe Rogan Experience podcast as the mystery cage fighter who was also the recipient of the 'Hungriest Butt Award'.

== Martial arts ==
Chad Bannon
- Born: November 13, 1970 (age 56); Denver, Colorado, United States
- Other names: D.O.A.
- Nationality: (United States) American
- Height: 1.92 m (6 ft 3 1/2 in)
- Weight: 112 kg (247 lb; 17.6 st)
- Division: Heavyweight
- Style: Freestyle
- Stance: Orthodox
- Fighting out of: Denver, Colorado, United States
- Team: Team Beast
- Years active: 2002-2003

Kickboxing record
- Total: 1
- Wins: 0
- Losses: 1
- Draws: 0

Mixed martial arts record
- Total: 1
- Wins: 1
- By knockout: 1
- By submission: 0
- Losses: 0
- Draws: 0
- Last updated on: April 6, 2003

Bannon went on to pursue a career as a mixed martial artist and kickboxer and competed for King of the Cage and K-1 as part of Bob Sapp's "Team Beast". He fought Rick Collup in 2002 at King of the Cage: 18 Sudden Impact, knocking him out in only 20 seconds.

Bannon then fought Tatsufumi Tomihira at K-1 Beast 2003 in Yamagata, Japan and lost in a unanimous decision. Bannon is a heavyweight, weighing 245 lbs and standing at 6'4".

== Kickboxing record ==
Kickboxing record
0 wins (0 KOs), 1 loss, 0 draws
Date	Result	Opponent	Event	Location	Method	Round	Time	Record
2003-04-06	Loss	(Japan) Tatsufumi Tomihira	K-1 Beast 2003	Yamagata, Japan	Decision (unanimous)	3	3:00	0-1
Legend: Win Loss Draw/No contest Notes

== Mixed martial arts record ==
Professional record breakdown
1 match	1 win	0 losses
By knockout	1	0

Res.	Record	Opponent	Method	Event	Date	Round	Time	Location	Notes
Win	1-0	Rick Collup	KO (punches)	KOTC 18 - Sudden Impact	November 1, 2002	1	0:20		

== Appearances ==
- Behind the Barn Door 1993 (Catalina Video) — Jack
- Kill Madonna (1996)
- White Men With Big Dicks 1996 (TLA Video) — Chad Anthony
- Step By Step (1997) — Frankie
- The Eddie Files (1997) — Burly Cop
- Quick Study: Sex Ed 1 (1998) — Todd Marshall
- A Night at the Roxbury (1998) — New Club Bouncer
- Pacific Blue (1999) — Wall
- V.I.P. (1999) — Beefy Guy
- Battle Dome (1999-2000), — D.O.A.
- Deus Ex (2000) — various voices
- Planet of the Apes (2001) — Red Ape Soldier/Man Hunt Ape
- House of 1000 Corpses (2003) — Killer Karl
- Bullets in the Gun (music video) by Toby Keith - Lightning

== See also ==
- List of male kickboxers
- Christian Boeving
- Andrew Bryniarski
