= Somewhere Else (Toby Keith song) =

Single by Toby Keith

from the album Bullets in the Gun
- Released: February 28, 2011
- Recorded: 2010
- Genre: Country
- Length: 3:06
- Label: Show Dog-Universal Music
- Songwriters: Toby Keith; Bobby Pinson
- Producer: Toby Keith

Toby Keith singles chronology
"Bullets in the Gun" (2010)	"Somewhere Else" (2011)	"Made in America" (2011)

"Somewhere Else" is a song co-written and recorded by American country music singer Toby Keith. It was released in February 2011 as the third and final single from his 2010 album Bullets in the Gun. The song peaked at number 12 on the US Billboard Hot Country Songs chart. Keith wrote this song with Bobby Pinson.

== Content ==
The song describes a downbeat character who struggles to come to terms with the collapse of a relationship. Since home is where the heartache is coming from, he decides to withstand the barrage of memories at a bar.

== Critical reception ==
Gary Graff of Billboard wrote that the song was "shoot-from-the- hip cleverness". The song got a "thumbs up" from Blake Boldt of Engine 145, whose review praised the production for "bel[ying] the narrator’s disappointment" and called the song "brooding", also saying that it proved that Keith "has quite a few creative tricks left up his sleeve". Kevin John Coyne of Country Universe gave the song a B rating, saying that "does breakup about as good as anybody" and that he doesn't believe Keith is "capable of turning in a weak vocal performance." Bobby Peacock of Roughstock gave the song a 3.5/5 rating, saying that the production is "looser and funkier" than on Keith's other songs. He goes on to say that it "contrasts with the more downbeat lyrics of a fairly standard broken-heart song."

Jessica Phillips of Country Weekly described the song less favorably, saying that she considered Keith "more authentic" on the album's title track than on "Somewhere Else". Writing for the Los Angeles Times, Randy Lewis compared it to "Is That All You Got" and "In a Couple of Days", saying that the songs "have a few nice writerly details in their romance-gone-bad setups, but they don't offer much wisdom."

== Chart positions ==
Chart (2011)	Peak position
Canada Country (Billboard)	14
US Hot Country Songs (Billboard)	12
US Billboard Hot 100	80

=== Year-end charts ===
Chart (2011)	Position
US Country Songs (Billboard)	62
