= Drinks After Work (song) =

Single by Toby Keith

from the album Drinks After Work
- Released: June 25, 2013
- Genre: Country
- Length: 3:32
- Label: Show Dog-Universal Music
- Songwriters: Barry Dean; Natalie Hemby; Luke Laird
- Producer: Toby Keith

Toby Keith singles chronology
"Hope on the Rocks" (2012)	"Drinks After Work" (2013)	"Shut Up and Hold On" (2013)

"Drinks After Work" is a song written by Barry Dean, Natalie Hemby, and Luke Laird, and recorded by American country music artist Toby Keith. It was released in June 2013 as the first single from his album of the same name. It is the only track from the album that Keith did not have a hand in writing.

== Critical reception ==
Billy Dukes of Taste of Country gave the song two stars out of five, writing that "‘Drinks After Work’ is so far removed from what fans expect from Keith that it’s jarring." Matt Bjorke of Roughstock gave the song a favorable review, saying "Drinks After Work" is the most relevant Toby Keith's sounded at Country Radio in quite some time. He might've scored hits here or there but he understands the 'game' that an artist must be able to play at Country radio from time to time and this one truly feels like his own "Pontoon" of sorts (as well it should since it was written by the same writing team) and there's no way "Drinks After Work" isn't a massive hit this summer for Toby Keith. It's a can't-miss single." Giving it a "B", Tammy Ragusa of Country Weekly thought that the "arrangement is unexpected and seems a bit electronic for what we expect from Toby", and said that its lyrics fit his style even though he did not write it.

== Chart performance ==
"Drinks After Work" debuted at number 26 on the U.S. Billboard Country Airplay chart for the week of June 29, 2013. It also debuted at number 36 on the U.S. Billboard Hot Country Songs chart for the week of July 13, 2013. It also debuted at number 19 on the U.S. Billboard Bubbling Under Hot 100 Singles chart for the week of July 13, 2013. It also debuted at number 98 on the Canadian Hot 100 chart for the week of August 10, 2013. This was Keith’s final top 20 hit before his death in 2024.

Chart (2013)	Peak position
Canada Hot 100 (Billboard)	95
Canada Country (Billboard)	30
US Bubbling Under Hot 100 (Billboard)	2
US Country Airplay (Billboard)	17
US Hot Country Songs (Billboard)	28

=== Year-end charts ===
Chart (2013)	Position
US Country Airplay (Billboard)	72
US Hot Country Songs (Billboard)	71
