= Drinks After Work =

Studio album by Toby Keith
- Released: October 29, 2013
- Genre: Country
- Length: 32:23
- Label: Show Dog-Universal Music
- Producer: Toby Keith

Toby Keith chronology
Hope on the Rocks (2012)	Drinks After Work (2013)	35 MPH Town (2015)

Singles from Drinks After Work
- 1. "Drinks After Work" Released: June 25, 2013; 2. "Shut Up and Hold On" Released: November 18, 2013

Professional ratings
Review scores
Source	Rating
AllMusic	3/5 stars

Drinks After Work is the nineteenth studio album by American country music artist Toby Keith. It was released on October 29, 2013, by Show Dog-Universal Music. Keith wrote or co-wrote nine of the album's new tracks. A deluxe edition was also released with three bonus tracks.

== Commercial performance ==
In its first week of release, the album debuted at number 7 on the Billboard 200, selling 35,000 copies. As of September 2015, the album has sold 140,000 copies in the U.S.

== Track listing ==
No.	Title	Writer(s)	Length
1.	"Shut Up and Hold On"	Toby Keith; Bobby Pinson	2:55
2.	"Drinks After Work"	Barry Dean; Natalie Hemby; Luke Laird	3:32
3.	"Before We Knew They Were Good"	Keith; Pinson; Rivers Rutherford	2:56
4.	"Little Miss Tear Stain"	Keith; Scotty Emerick	3:02
5.	"The Other Side of Him"	Keith; Pinson	4:01
6.	"Last Living Cowboy"	Keith; Emerick	2:54
7.	"Show Me What You're Workin' With"	Keith; Rutherford	3:14
8.	"Whole Lot More Than That"	Keith; Pinson	2:38
9.	"I'll Probably Be Out Fishin'"	Keith; Emerick	3:08
10.	"Hard Way to Make an Easy Living"	Keith; Pinson	4:03
Total length:			32:23

Deluxe edition
No.	Title	Writer(s)	Length
11.	"Call a Marine"	Keith; Pinson	3:16
12.	"Chuckie's Gone"	Keith	3:07
13.	"Margaritaville" (with Sammy Hagar)	Jimmy Buffett	4:55

== Personnel ==
Adapted from liner notes.

- Greg Barnhill - background vocals (tracks 1, 4–12)
- Pat Bergeson - harmonica (tracks 1, 6, 8)
- Perry Coleman - background vocals (track 3)
- J.T. Corenflos - electric guitar (tracks 2, 7)
- Chad Cromwell - drums
- Eric Darken - percussion, vibraphone (track 2)
- Kevin "Swine" Grantt - bass guitar (track 4)
- Kenny Greenberg - electric guitar
- Rob Hajacos - fiddle (tracks 7, 9, 11, 12)
- Aubrey Haynie - fiddle (tracks 6, 8)
- Natalie Hemby - background vocals (track 2)
- Rob Ickes - dobro (tracks 6, 8)
- Alex Jarvis - programming (track 2)
- Charlie Judge - cello, Hammond B-3 organ, jews harp, marimba, piano, synthesizer, Wurlitzer
- Toby Keith - lead vocals, background vocals (track 2)
- Mills Logan - programming (track 1)
- Brent Mason - electric guitar (tracks 3, 4, 10–12)
- Steve Nathan - Hammond B-3 organ (track 4)
- Russ Pahl - electric guitar (track 4), steel guitar (tracks 1–3, 5, 9, 11, 12)
- Danny Rader - acoustic guitar (tracks 2, 5, 6), mandolin (tracks 2, 6)
- Michael Rhodes - bass guitar (tracks 1, 3, 5, 6, 8, 10)
- David Santos - bass guitar (tracks 7, 9, 11, 12)
- Natalie Scott - background vocals (track 2)
- Jimmie Lee Sloas - bass guitar (track 2)
- Bobby Terry - acoustic guitar (tracks 7, 9, 11, 12)
- Ilya Toshinsky - banjo (track 1), acoustic guitar (tracks 1, 3, 6, 8, 10), mandolin (track 3)

== Chart performance ==
=== Weekly charts ===
Chart (2013–14)	Peak position
Australian Albums (ARIA)	37
UK Independent Albums (Official Charts)	49
US Billboard 200	7
US Top Country Albums (Billboard)	3

=== Year-end charts ===
Chart (2013)	Position
US Top Country Albums (Billboard)	69

Chart (2014)	Position
US Top Country Albums (Billboard)	59
