= Bullets in the Gun =

Studio album by Toby Keith
- Released: October 5, 2010
- Genre: Country
- Length: 36:10
- Label: Show Dog-Universal Music
- Producer: Toby Keith

Toby Keith chronology
American Ride (2009)	Bullets in the Gun (2010)	Clancy's Tavern (2011)

Singles from Bullets in the Gun
- 1. "Trailerhood" Released: June 28, 2010; 2. "Bullets in the Gun" Released: September 27, 2010; 3. "Somewhere Else" Released: February 28, 2011

Bullets in the Gun is the sixteenth studio album by American country music artist Toby Keith. It was released on October 5, 2010 by Show Dog-Universal Music. The album produced three singles with "Trailerhood", the title track, and "Somewhere Else". "Trailerhood" peaked at number 19 on the US Billboard Hot Country Songs chart, while the title track and "Somewhere Else" both reached number 12. This was Keith's first studio album to not produce a single Top 10 hit on the US country charts.

== Background ==
In an interview with Billboard, Keith talked about the recording for Bullets in the Gun, saying ""I'm in a great place right now, I probably wrote 40 or 50 songs in the last year and the songs are getting more and more happy. I did some movies, too, but now I'm just kicking back."

== Critical reception ==
Professional ratings
Aggregate scores
Source	Rating
Metacritic	(76/100)
Review scores
Source	Rating
Allmusic	4.5/5 stars
Billboard	(positive)
The Boston Globe	(positive)
Country Weekly	3/5 stars
Entertainment Weekly	B
Los Angeles Times	2.5/4 stars
The New York Times	(mixed)
Roughstock	(favorable)
The Washington Post	(positive)

Upon its release, Bullets in the Gun received generally positive reviews from most music critics. At Metacritic, which assigns a normalized rating out of 100 to reviews from mainstream critics, the album received an average score of 76, based on 6 reviews, which indicates "generally favorable reviews".

Bill Friskics-Warren of The Washington Post complimented the tracks on the release, saying "There isn't a weak track on the record, and most of the songs [...] are pretty terrific". Stephen Thomas Erlewine of Allmusic gave the album 4½ out of 5 stars and called it "a lean, tight record", stating "Bullets in the Gun winds up being the Toby Keith album with the lightest touch since 2006’s White Trash with Money." Matt Bjorke with Roughstock commented on the album, saying "Bullets in the Gun is an interesting album and it feels like a joyful mixture of songs about different stages of relationships and life" and called it "Keith’s best album of at least the last five years". Gary Graff with Billboard Magazine gave a favorable review of the album, saying "It's full of shoot-from-the- hip cleverness".

Jessica Phillips with Country Weekly gave it three stars, commented saying that "the album [is packed] with songs meant to heal (or at least dull) a broken heart". Jon Caramanica with The New York Times referred to Bullets in the Gun as "[Keith's] most scattershot album to date; a jumble of attitudes and tactics" and said "[he] is singing without conviction on songs that are mere archetypes and lack any of his signature gestures".

== Commercial performance ==
The album debuted at number one on both the US Billboard 200 chart and Top Country albums chart, selling 71,000 copies in its first week of release. It's the smallest debut at number one since Nielsen SoundScan began tracking the chart in May 1991. In its second week of release, the album dropped to number nine on the Billboard 200 selling 30,000 copies. In its third week of release, the album fell to number twenty one on the Billboard 200, selling 17,923 copies. As of the chart dated May 7, 2011, the album has sold 323,880 copies in the US.

== Track listing ==
No.	Title	Writer(s)	Length
1.	"Bullets in the Gun"	Toby Keith; Rivers Rutherford	4:16
2.	"Somewhere Else"	Keith; Bobby Pinson	3:06
3.	"Trailerhood"	Keith	2:53
4.	"In a Couple of Days"	Keith; Pinson	3:46
5.	"Think About You All of the Time"	Keith	3:44
6.	"Kissin' in the Rain"	Keith; Pinson	3:55
7.	"Drive It on Home"	Keith; Pinson	3:22
8.	"Ain't Breakin' Nothin'"	Keith; Pinson	3:58
9.	"Is That All You Got"	Keith; Dean Dillon; Scotty Emerick	3:35
10.	"Get Out of My Car"	Keith; Pinson	3:30
Total length:			36:05

Deluxe Edition
No.	Title	Writer(s)	Length
11.	"11 Months And 29 Days (live)"	Billy Sherrill	4:44
12.	"I've Been a Long Time Leaving (But I'll Be a Long Time Gone) (live)"	Waylon Jennings; Roger Miller	6:08
13.	"Chug-a-Lug (live)"	Roger Miller	2:59
14.	"Sundown (live)"	Gordon Lightfoot	4:34

== Personnel ==
- Robert Ascroft – photography
- Susie Carlson – stylist
- Kim Debus – stylist
- P.J. Fenech – assistant
- Tom Freitag – assistant
- Jed Hackett – overdubs
- Mills Logan – engineer, mixing, overdub engineer
- Meredith Louie – creative director
- Ken Love – mastering
- Mike Paragone – assistant
- Lowell Reynolds – assistant
- Brien Sager – assistant
- Elaine Shock – creative director
- Andrew Southam – photography
- Todd Tidwell – assistant
- Ted Wheeler – assistant
- Pat Bergeson – acoustic guitar, harmonica, jew's harp
- Bruce Bouton – pedal steel guitar
- Tom Bukovac – electric guitar
- Perry Coleman – background vocals
- Chad Cromwell – drums
- Eric Darken – percussion, vibraphone
- Paul Franklin – dobro, pedal steel guitar
- Kevin "Swine" Grantt – bass guitar
- Kenny Greenberg – electric guitar
- Aubrey Haynie – fiddle
- John Hobbs – organ, piano
- Charlie Judge – synthesizer strings, synthesizer
- Toby Keith – lead vocals, background vocals
- Phil Madeira – accordion, organ, wurlitzer
- Chris McHugh – drums
- Steve Nathan – piano
- Michael Rhodes – bass guitar
- Randy Scruggs – banjo
- Steven Sheehan – acoustic guitar
- Jimmie Lee Sloas – bass guitar
- Ilya Toshinsky – banjo, acoustic guitar, mandolin

== Charts ==
=== Weekly charts ===
Chart (2010)	Peak position
Canadian Albums (Billboard)	23
US Billboard 200	1
US Top Country Albums (Billboard)	1

=== Year-end charts ===
Chart (2010)	Position
US Billboard 200	199
US Top Country Albums (Billboard)	41
Chart (2011)	Position
US Top Country Albums (Billboard)	35

== Certifications ==
Region	Certification	Certified units/sales
United States (RIAA)	Gold	500,000^{‡}
^{‡} Sales+streaming figures based on certification alone.
