= Made in America (Toby Keith song) =

Single by Toby Keith

from the album Clancy's Tavern
- Released: June 13, 2011
- Recorded: 2011
- Genre: Country
- Length: 3:16
- Label: Show Dog-Universal Music
- Songwriter: Toby Keith; Bobby Pinson; Scott Reeves
- Producer: Toby Keith

Toby Keith singles chronology
"Somewhere Else" (2011)	"Made in America" (2011)	"Red Solo Cup" (2011)

"Made in America" is a song co-written and recorded by American country music singer Toby Keith. It was released in June 2011 as the first single from his 2011 album Clancy's Tavern. Keith wrote this song with Bobby Pinson and Scott Reeves.

== Background and writing ==
Keith wrote the song with frequent collaborator Bobby Pinson and actor/singer Scott Reeves. Keith told Billboard magazine that they wrote the song in early 2010 and he almost left it off the album because of the number of other patriotic songs he has recorded. Pinson told Taste of Country that he and Reeves started talking about buying American-made merchandise to support the country. After writing part of the song, they thought it sounded like something Keith would record, so Pinson took what he had finished to Keith, who helped him complete the song.

== Content ==
The song is an uptempo, in which an older farmer (Keith's own father, according to the song), a retired United States Marine, and his schoolteacher wife, who will only buy American products, are disgusted by the influx of foreign goods, from cars to cotton.

== Critical reception ==
Billy Dukes of Taste of Country gave the song three stars out of five. He thought that Keith "sings with plenty of passion", but criticized the lyrics by saying, "While the song doesn’t feel like a remake of his previous anthems, it doesn’t live up to their high watermark, either." Matt Bjorke of Roughstock rated it four stars out of five, saying that while it is a 'list song', it had "strongly constructed lyrics". Former UFC fighter Dan Henderson used the song as his entrance music.

== Music video ==
Keith filmed the video in Cedarburg, Wisconsin during an Independence Day parade, at a farm and family fourth of July picnic in Addison, Wisconsin and in Milwaukee, Wisconsin during his performance at Summerfest. It was directed by Michael Salomon.

== Chart performance ==
"Made in America" reached number one on the Billboard Hot Country Songs chart dated October 15, 2011, becoming Keith's twentieth and final number one single during his lifetime. It also peaked at number 40 on the Billboard Hot 100.

Chart (2011)	Peak position
US Hot Country Songs (Billboard)	1
US Billboard Hot 100	40

=== Year-end charts ===
Chart (2011)	Position
US Country Songs (Billboard)	15

== Certifications ==
Region	Certification	Certified units/sales
United States (RIAA)	Platinum	1,000,000^{‡}
^{‡} Sales+streaming figures based on certification alone.
