= Hope on the Rocks (song) =

Single by Toby Keith

from the album Hope on the Rocks
- Released: November 5, 2012
- Genre: Country
- Length: 3:39 (album version); 3:22 (radio edit)
- Label: Show Dog-Universal Music
- Songwriter: Toby Keith
- Producer: Toby Keith

Toby Keith singles chronology
| "I Like Girls That Drink Beer" (2012) | "Hope on the Rocks" (2012) | "Drinks After Work" (2013) |

"Hope on the Rocks" is a song written and recorded by American country music artist Toby Keith. It was released in November 2012 as the second single and title track from his album Hope on the Rocks.

== Critical reception ==
Billy Dukes of Taste of Country gave the song four stars out of five, writing that "in just a few lines, the loved singer shows how capable he is of capturing the country nation’s emotions in a story that’s just far enough removed from reality to still be enjoyable." Matt Bjorke of Roughstock gave the song a favorable review, calling it "a fantastic, well-written song that certainly ranks amongst the best songs that Toby's ever written."

== Music video ==
The music video was directed by Michael Salomon and premiered in November 2012.

== Chart performance ==
"Hope on the Rocks" debuted at number 57 on the U.S. Billboard Country Airplay chart for the week of November 24, 2012. It also debuted at number 48 on the U.S. Billboard Hot Country Songs chart for the week of December 15, 2012. It also debuted at number 20 on the U.S. Billboard Bubbling Under Hot 100 Singles chart for the week of February 16, 2013.

| Chart (2012–2013) | Peak position |
|---|---|
| Canada Country (Billboard) | 40 |
| US Bubbling Under Hot 100 (Billboard) | 13 |
| US Country Airplay (Billboard) | 18 |
| US Hot Country Songs (Billboard) | 29 |

=== Year-end charts ===
| Chart (2013) | Position |
|---|---|
| US Country Airplay (Billboard) | 86 |
| US Hot Country Songs (Billboard) | 99 |
