= Beers Ago =

Single by Toby Keith

from the album Clancy's Tavern
- Released: March 12, 2012
- Genre: Country
- Length: 3:28 (album version); 3:23 (radio edit)
- Label: Show Dog-Universal Music
- Songwriters: Toby Keith; Bobby Pinson
- Producer: Toby Keith

Toby Keith singles chronology
"Red Solo Cup" (2011)	"Beers Ago" (2012)	"I Like Girls That Drink Beer" (2012)

"Beers Ago" is a song co-written and recorded by American country music artist Toby Keith. It was released in March 2012 as the third and final single from his 2011 album Clancy's Tavern. Keith co-wrote the song with Bobby Pinson. A remixed version by DJ Jason Nevins also appears on the deluxe edition of Keith's sixteenth studio album Hope on the Rocks, released the following year. It is Keith's final Top 10 hit before his death in 2024.

== Content ==
The song is a reminiscence about the narrator's teenage years, saying that they still seem like yesterday "[e]ven though / That was fourteen hundred and fifty-two beers ago".

== Critical reception ==
Billy Dukes of Taste of Country gave the song three and a half stars out of five, writing that "his rapid-fire lyrics fit like pieces to a puzzle, with smart rhymes and imaginative references that captivate." Kevin John Coyne of Country Universe gave the song a B+ grade, saying that "there's a vibrancy to it because of Keith's skill as a vocalist."

== Chart performance ==
"Beers Ago" debuted at number 56 on the U.S. Billboard Hot Country Songs chart for the week of March 24, 2012.

Chart (2012)	Peak position
Canada Country (Billboard)	5
Canada Hot 100 (Billboard)	54
US Billboard Hot 100	52
US Hot Country Songs (Billboard)	6

=== Year-end charts ===
Chart (2012)	Position
US Country Songs (Billboard)	47

== Certifications ==
Region	Certification	Certified units/sales
United States (RIAA)	Gold	500,000^{^}
^{^} Shipments figures based on certification alone.
