= Trailerhood =

Single by Toby Keith

from the album Bullets in the Gun
- Released: June 28, 2010
- Recorded: 2010
- Genre: Country
- Length: 2:54
- Label: Show Dog-Universal
- Songwriter: Toby Keith
- Producer: Toby Keith

Toby Keith singles chronology
"Every Dog Has Its Day" (2010)	"Trailerhood" (2010)	"Bullets in the Gun" (2010)

"Trailerhood" is a song written and recorded by American country music artist Toby Keith. It was released in June 2010 as the first single from his 2010 album Bullets in the Gun. The song peaked at number 19 on the US Billboard Hot Country Songs chart and at number 97 on the Billboard Hot 100.

== Content ==
"Trailerhood" is an upbeat song that celebrates the trailer park lifestyle.

In the narrator's view, it's a world filled with pink flamingos and plastic pools (Carl, who lives next door), poker games (Gamblin' James, who will let anyone participate for $15), "music playing up and down the block", auto racing, and Dallas Cowboys football. But it's also a "little piece of paradise" without judgment, where true friendships can be found.

The song also makes fun of the tendency of trailer parks seeming to attract tornadoes, suggesting that when the warning sirens go off, one should grab a six-pack and a lawn chair to watch.

== Critical reception ==
Matt Bjorke of Roughstock in his review was mainly positive, describing the melody as "a delicious mixture of classic country sounds and textures that really help keep the whole song light and just fun." He also called it a perfect song for the summer/fall playlists but that "people who live in big houses and cities or even suburbia will not likely relate to the lyrics". Bjorke also said that the song showcases some of Keith's best vocals in quite a while.

== Music video ==
The music video was directed by Michael Salomon and premiered on the CMT website on July 14, 2010.

It features Toby singing in a trailer park with scenes of everyday life: his neighbor Carl lying outside in his "pool" (actually an inflatable kiddie pool), his other neighbor James playing poker with his friends, an unnamed woman hanging clothes on the clothesline to dry, and two boys watching a scantily-clad woman wash her car.

Halfway through the song, a windstorm passes through which creates havoc all over the trailer park (Carl's pool blows over, James' sandwich blows away – to Toby who proceeds to eat it while chaining himself to his lawn chair and using a staple gun to keep his cap on, the clothes drying woman loses her laundry, a TV falls off its stand, someone's tooth falls out, a local reporter interviews residents while having his toupee blow upwards, and the car washing woman loses her bra).

At the end, the residents gather together (except for the woman, who is pleading with the boys for the return of her bra while they want her to uncover herself). The final scene is the same as the first: Carl refilling his kiddie pool.

== Chart performance ==
The song debuted at number 55 on the U.S. Billboard Hot Country Songs charts for the week of June 19, 2010. When falling from the charts after reaching number 19, the song became Keith's lowest peaking single since "Mockingbird" peaked at number 27 in 2004.

Chart (2010)	Peak position
Canada Country (Billboard)	35
US Hot Country Songs (Billboard)	19
US Billboard Hot 100	97

== Certifications ==
Region	Certification	Certified units/sales
United States (RIAA)	Gold	500,000^{‡}
^{‡} Sales+streaming figures based on certification alone.
