= Battle Dome =

American television series

- Country of origin: United States
- No. of episodes: 30

Production
- Camera setup: Multicamera setup
- Running time: 1 hour
- Production company: Columbia TriStar Television Distribution

Original release
- Network: First-run syndication
- Release: September 4, 1999 – April 1, 2001

Battle Dome is a syndicated American television series that aired from September 1999 to April 2001. It combined elements of American Gladiators – inspired athletic competition – with scripted antics more reminiscent of professional wrestling. Recurring character-athletes known as "Warriors" competed against weekly contestants in a variety of physically demanding (and sometimes dangerous) events. The series was filmed at the Los Angeles Memorial Sports Arena and produced by Columbia TriStar Television.

The entire second season of Battle Dome is available for purchase on iTunes and Amazon Video.

Mill Creek Entertainment announced the complete series on DVD.

== Overview ==
A Warrior typically entered the show's arena accompanied by his own bombastic theme music and-in several cases-a comely female sidekick; in later episodes, weekly contestants were also allotted female companions, courtesy of Perfect 10 magazine.

The announcer for the show was Steve Albert (brother of Marv and the uncle of Kenny); Scott Ferrall provided color commentary. Seth Stockton served as referee for the entire run. Downtown Julie Brown appeared in early episodes, as a sideline correspondent but was replaced by Kathleen McClellan for the run of the show. The "Chairman", whose face remained off camera, oversaw the proceedings. Halfway through the show's run, Ferrall and Brown were replaced by Ed Lover and Brien Blakely, respectively, and "The chairman" was dropped from the show.

Battle Dome was also broadcast in the UK, on the Challenge and Bravo networks, as well as on Channel 5, now "Five." It was also broadcast in Ireland on TV3.

Three male contestants competed in a series of four or five events, which varied in intensity and danger factor. After the fourth or fifth event, the two highest scoring competitors advanced to the Battle Dome final. In addition to facing the contestants, the Battle Dome Warriors were in a show-long competition against each other for the Battle Dome Warriors Championship belt. The Warriors were ranked before the competition started and could move up or down the list depending on either how well they performed during the show or how well they politicked with the chairman or his on-camera assistant, Bobbie Haven (played by model Bobbie Brown, who prior to this was best known for her appearance in the video for Warrant's "Cherry Pie").

If the second and third place players were tied, the tie was broken in a rather novel way. Both players would stand on platforms on two separate metal discs, with the discs being pulled back and rammed together at high rates of speed. The intensity of the hit grew until one player fell off, at which point they would be going home. This also would help determine the Warriors champion if the championship was in question at the end of a show.

After all ties and championships between the Warriors and contestants were settled, the two remaining players moved into the Battle Dome for the final round, in which the two competitors wrestled each other in an attempt to throw the opponent off an elevated platform. Doing so won the match, a cash prize, and a Battle Dome championship ring. The winner would also advance in the Battle Dome tournament, with the winner getting a large cash prize, a motorcycle, and a Battle Dome Championship belt at the end of the season.

=== Second season changes ===
- The Battle Dome Warriors Championship and Warrior Championship Belt were removed.
- In addition to the male competitors, season two added a female special where five women competed against each other with the warriors acting as "Coaches".
- The Battle Dome Cage event changed significantly. Wrestling was no longer permitted with the emphasis put much more onto martial arts style fighting, in particular kickboxing. The aim was to remove your opponent from the platform. if both men fell, the battle would restart. this final event had no time limit.
- Most of the Battle Dome Warriors' valets (among those who had them) were replaced by the Perfect 10 models that the contestants were accompanied by. With the exception of T-Money, who kept "The Posse".

=== World Championship Wrestling ===
In fall of 2000, the stars of Battle Dome and World Championship Wrestling (WCW) began a brief cross-promotional feud. It kicked off when WCW wrestlers disrupted a Battle Dome taping. In retaliation, on the November 6 edition of Monday Nitro, T-Money, Cuda, Mike O'Dell (husband of WCW star Midajah), D.O.A., and Bubba King began heckling in the audience as Diamond Dallas Page spoke to the Chicago crowd. Rick Steiner, Ernest Miller, and Buff Bagwell came to Page's aid before security ended the physical dispute. The feud between these men continued as far as November 20, mere months before the buyout of WCW by the World Wrestling Federation (WWF).

== Events ==
All events were overseen by Referee Seth Stockton. His actual level of authority is unclear although he did ban a few warriors from competing for bad behaviour.

Battle Wheel

Two warriors competed. The event took place on a large, rotating platform which resembled a right circular cone with its outside edge and apex flattened. The contenders had 60 seconds to force both warriors to touch the bottom ring of the wheel with any part of their body. The warriors were allowed to do essentially anything necessary to keep this from occurring. The contenders had to dispatch of the first warrior on the lower portion of the wheel (usually Jake Fury) before taking on the warrior at the top of the wheel (usually Cuda). 25 points were earned for removing the lower warrior from the wheel, and an additional 25 points were earned for getting the 2nd warrior off the wheel.

- Jake Fury suffered a nasty ankle injury on the Battle Wheel towards the end of Season 1. Fury's ankle was "blown out" and facing the incorrect direction. He only competed sparingly on the show afterwards.
- Scott Anthony, a contestant, also had his ankle broken/twisted (similar to Jake Fury's) under virtually the same circumstances in episode four of season 1.
- In Season 2, the Battle Wheel was significantly changed as the Wheel was lowered and wider, making it difficult for a contestant to defeat a warrior and so the ankle blow-out injury never happened again.

Take Down

A football type event. The contender was placed in the center of an enclosed area with 2 warriors on each end (Michael O'Dell participated in this event most often). Behind each warrior were 4 different lights with actuators beneath them. In the 1st season, a light was lit up behind the warrior (Steve and Scott typically noted that the warriors did not know which light was lit). On the referee's whistle, the contender tried to hit the actuator to turn the light off. Each light turned off was worth 25 points. The contender was only allowed one attempt per light; no "second effort" was allowed. After each attempt, the contender returned to the center and repeated against the other warrior. This would continue for 60 seconds. In the 2nd season, all 8 lights (4 at each end) were lit up. The contender chose which light to go after and the warrior would have to stop them. Otherwise, the rules remained the same from season 1.

Rollercage of Fire (1st Season), Rollercage (2nd Season)

Contenders were raised up into a revolving cylindrical cage with holes built into it. In the 1st season, a ring of fire was set outside the cage at each end, mainly to set the atmosphere. The fire ring was removed in season two, as well as the reference to it in the event's title. Contenders had 60 seconds to force the warrior (Almost always T-Money, with 1 or 2 appearances by DOA in the later part of the 1st season) through one of the holes while avoiding the same fate. Forcing the warrior out earned 25 points (later 50). Draws originally scored nothing, but were later increased to a 25-point score.

Aerial Kickboxing

Contenders and opposing warriors hung from an undulating metal grid roughly 10 feet off the ground. The contender attempted to kick the warrior (most often Bubba King) off the grid within 60 seconds without being removed from the grid themselves. Kicks to the head were technically against the rules and would result in DQ's. At least 1 contender was DQ'd because of head shots. If the contender kicked the warrior off the grid, the contender scored 50 points. Draws scored 25 points. Most contenders were lucky to score short of a DQ of the warrior. Bubba King and Sleepwalker were almost impossible to beat, but O'Dell actually was impossible to defeat, as he never lost a match and rarely surrendered a draw.

- On one occasion, a contestant kicked Bubba King in the head. Bubba was stunned, but he still won. After the match, the "reporter" had Bubba talk about the match. Bubba was angry, and complained about the contestant breaking the rules (by kicking him in the head), and Bubba said half his body went numb from the head kick.

G-Force

A central rotating tower had three arms extending from the top of the central tower. Each of the contenders hung onto a handle at the end of each arm. A warrior stood on a platform above this tower, throwing balls at the contenders as the tower spun. The tower's speed increased steadily as the event progressed. The last contender/s standing earned 25 points, and a bonus 25 points was earned for lasting 60 seconds.

Battle Bridge

A large bridge spun quickly in mid-air. The contender and the warrior were each given a large padded club to use to knock the other off the bridge as it spun. Contenders scored 50 points for successfully knocking the warrior off the bridge, or 25 points for lasting 60 seconds.

Battle Field

This event was similar to Powerball on American Gladiators. Unlike Powerball, contenders competed one-on-one against a single warrior, who defended a single scoring bin. The scoring bin was located in the center of the playing field atop an approximately 5-foot-tall (1.5 m) pyramid. The warrior wore boxing gloves and could freely attack the contender as much as they wanted to keep them from scoring. Each ball scored was worth 25 points.

Battle Hoop

Contenders began in the center of a circular field. A large hanging hoop moved around the outside perimeter of the field, with its opening always facing the center of the field. A warrior stood on the outside perimeter of the field to block the contender from jumping through the hoop. Contenders had 60 seconds to try to jump through the hoop as many times as they could, returning to the center after each attempt. Each successful pass through the hoop earned 25 points.

Battle Wall

Contenders had to get over three walls defended by the Battle Dome warriors. A warrior stood on the opposite side of each wall. Each wall was around 3 feet in height. The walls became narrower as the event went on making it harder to get by the warriors. Each wall that a contender was successful in climbing was worth 25 points.

Evader

A contender had to light targets while avoiding medicine balls being launched by two warriors. Contenders had 60 seconds to light up all the targets on the two towers (one at a time). Originally, the warriors only had to hit the contenders 3 times to end the match, but it was later increased to 5 times. Lighting up all the targets on a tower (this may not have ever been done) was worth 25 points and lighting up all the targets was worth 50. This event was considered to be Jake Fury's signature event.

Anti-Gravity

This event, along with Interceptor, was always played last because of the point opportunities. Contenders had to light strips by hitting buttons on a grid while moving along handles placed on the grid. Every strip lit was worth 25 points, for a possible 150. The contenders were also chased by a Battle Dome Warrior, which was almost always The Commander, and could lose the game in one of two ways: either losing their grip, which would result in the contender floating away, or having the Warrior rip their harness off and send them to the floor.

Interceptor

Called a game of cat and mouse, a contender had to fly around the Interceptor grid lighting targets worth 25 points each until caught by the warrior (again, almost always The Commander) or time ran out. Each target was worth 25 points. There was a maximum of 175 points available to the contenders.

Ultimate Body Slam

This was a tiebreaker, usually between the warriors for the right to hold the warrior belt. If the top warrior had been less than stellar and a fellow warrior close in the rankings had performed well, but not well enough to win the belt outright, the two warriors would compete in Ultimate Body Slam. This game was simply a test of endurance; each player stood on a platform behind a metal disk. The disks were then pulled back and slammed into each other at increasing speed until one of the two fell off and lost.

== Warriors ==
During the first season, the warriors maintained distinct personalities, similar to professional wrestling characters. The warriors competed for the Battledome Belt. After each event the warriors were "ranked", according to how well they did in the competition. At the end of that day's competition the top ranked warrior received the Battledome Belt. The "ranking" was done by the mysterious chairman. The chairman supposedly owned the Battledome. He was only seen in silhouette wearing a large cowboy hat. What little else was known about him is that he was supposedly an older man. Karen Ko was supposed to be his trophy wife, and Bobbie Haven his secretary. It was Bobbie who would deliver the messages from the chairman to the other warriors and the fans. At the start of the second season, the chairman, the standings board, and the Battledome Belt were dropped from the competition.

First season warriors

The original series had 9 warriors. Some competed every week, with some making only a few appearances.

- Bubba King (Timothy Elwell)

The "king" of aerial kickboxing. Had very few defeats and proved almost invincible with most challengers lasting a maximum of 30 seconds. Rarely played any other event during the show's run, but did play Anti-Gravity on at least one occasion.

- The Commander (Christian Boeving)

Speciality event appeared to be Anti-Gravity with Interceptor a close second. One of the smaller warriors. Proved very speedy and powerful against challengers.

- Cuda (Randolph Jones)

The largest warrior during season 1. Dominated Battle Wheel. Always appeared in the top position on this event. Did make fleeting appearances on other events.

- D.O.A. (Chad Bannon)

Made few appearances in season 1 but became much more prolific in Season 2. Speciality event appeared to be Rollercage.

- Jake Fury (Gary Kasper)

The wild and unpredictable Fury appeared in several games. Particularly able at games G-Force and Evader. Suffered a severe ankle injury during season 1 while participating in Battle Wheel. He recovered and returned for season 2.

- Michael O'Dell (Michael O'Hearn)

The poster boy of Battledome. Considered handsome, toned, and tanned. An all-around warrior. Played most games with Aerial Kickboxing and Takedown proving specialities.

- Payne (John Sperandeo)

Appeared fleetingly during season 1, mainly as cover for injured warriors. Entered arena wearing a straitjacket and howling. Difficult to tell what he was good at as he didn't participate in many events.

- Sleepwalker (Woon Young Park)

Another warrior who seemed to be cover for fellow injured warriors. Did participate in Anti-Gravity and aerial kickboxing but suffered a shoulder injury in the event. Seemed very capable in events he participated in.

- T-Money (Terry Crews)

Character that is accompanied by "The Posse". Blinged up with jewelry and a dollar sign chain around his neck. Very good at several games but Rollercage was his speciality. Did not take losing very well.

Second season warriors

Season 2 saw the departure of Payne and Sleepwalker for unknown reasons. The remaining 7 warriors returned and were accompanied by 6 new warriors to bring the total up to 13.

'Returning Warriors:

- Bubba King
- The Commander
- Cuda
- D.O.A.
- Jake Fury
- Michael O'Dell
- T-Money

New Warriors

- Baby Blue (Anthony McClanahan)

Seemed to act as an alternate for injured warriors. Very impressive during his appearances. Virtually unbeatable in Takedown.

- Johnny Rocco (Ron Cerenzo)

Did not appear until later in the season then became a regular. Played several games. Takedown and Battle Hoop were clearly his best.

- Snake (Jesse "Justice" Smith, Jr.)

An all-rounder who participated in many games. No stand-out performances but very capable on events he played in.

- Mad Dog Steele (Stefan Gamlin)

Dominated his early appearances and participated in many games. Got injured later in the season and did not appear again.

- Moose (Scott Milne)

Appeared only fleetingly during the series. Mainly as cover for injured warriors. The biggest of all warriors weighing over 300 lbs.

- The Prince (Maximilien Atoki)

Another warrior who made on and off appearances throughout the season. Played a few games with Battle Wheel proving his speciality.

== The women of Battle Dome ==
A partial list of female companions:

- Nicole, Jaclyn and Erica Dahm – The Dahm Triplets – Always accompanied O'Dell during his outings. Unless they were tempted away by another warrior!
- Bobbie Haven (Bobbie Brown, best known for Warrant's "Cherry Pie" music video) – The chairman's very helpful and giving secretary...
- Angel (Karen Taucher) – Girlfriend of Jake Fury.
- Karen Ko (Karen Kim) – The Chairman's "trophy wife" and manager of The Commander.
