= Red Solo Cup =

Single by Toby Keith

from the album Clancy's Tavern
- Released: October 10, 2011
- Recorded: June 2011
- Genre: Country; comedy
- Length: 3:43
- Label: Show Dog-Universal
- Songwriters: Brett Beavers; Jim Beavers; Brad Warren; Brett Warren
- Producer: Toby Keith

Toby Keith singles chronology
| "Made in America" (2011) | "Red Solo Cup" (2011) | "Beers Ago" (2012) |

"Red Solo Cup" is a song written by Brett Warren, Brad Warren, Brett Beavers, and Jim Beavers and recorded by American country music singer Toby Keith. The song was released on October 10, 2011, as the second single from Keith's 2011 album Clancy's Tavern. This is the only song on the album that Keith did not write or co-write. The song was featured in the Glee episode "Hold On to Sixteen". Insider ranked it as the second worst song of the 2010s and Keith himself called it "the stupidest song [he] ever heard in [his] life" but also "freakin' awesome."A remixed version by Johnny Mac appears on the deluxe edition of Keith's sixteenth studio album Hope on the Rocks, released the following year. It was Keith's biggest and final chart hit before his death in 2024.

== Content ==
"Red Solo Cup" is about the Solo Cup Company's red style of plastic cups, and their common usage at parties, among other occasions. It is in the key of A major, with a primary chord pattern of A–Bm7–E–A on the verses, which are spoken-word. The final chorus modulates a whole step upward to B major.

== History ==
Singer-songwriter duo the Warren Brothers (Brad and Brett Warren) co-wrote "Red Solo Cup" with Brett Beavers and his brother, Jim Beavers. The four of them decided to write something that would "make us all laugh and smile". According to Brett Warren, Jim did the majority of the writing. Keith told CMT that it was "the stupidest song that [he had] ever heard in [his] life" but also "freakin' awesome".

All four writers sing backing vocals on the song. The Warren Brothers also perform acoustic guitar on it, while Jim plays bass guitar and Brett plays six-string banjo.

== Music video ==
The music video includes cameos from Jeff Dunham (and his character Bubba J), Carrot Top, Ted Nugent, Sammy Hagar, Craig Ferguson (on set of his Late night talk show The Late Late Show alongside his Robot Skeleton sidekick Geoff Peterson, the latter of whose scene is omitted in the Holiday Version), Roger Clemens, Eric Church, Joe Nichols, Lance Burton, and Larry Bird among others.

It had acquired more than 600,000 views on YouTube before the album's release. The video surpassed 69 million views as of February 2023.

== Chart performance ==
| Chart (2011–2012) | Peak position |
|---|---|
| Canada Country (Billboard) | 8 |
| Canada Hot 100 (Billboard) | 27 |
| US Hot Country Songs (Billboard) | 9 |
| US Billboard Hot 100 | 15 |

=== Year-end charts ===
| Chart (2012) | Position |
|---|---|
| Canada (Canadian Hot 100) | 89 |
| US Billboard Hot 100 | 82 |
| US Country Songs (Billboard) | 53 |

== Certifications ==
| Region | Certification | Certified units/sales |
|---|---|---|
| United States (RIAA) | 3× Platinum | 3,000,000^{‡} |
^{‡} Sales+streaming figures based on certification alone.

== Other versions and parodies ==
- German singer and entertainer Stefan Raab made up his own version of the song and changed the location of the song and its lyrics to a pub in Cologne. The whole song is sung in the typical dialect of Cologne.
- American parody artist Cledus T. Judd released a parody of "Red Solo Cup" titled "Double D Cups" on his 2012 album Parodyziac!!.
