= The Family Crews =

- Starring: Terry Crews; Rebecca Crews; Naomi Burton; Azriel Crews; Tera Crews; Wynfrey Crews; Isaiah Crews
- Theme music composer: Nickolas Ashford; Valerie Simpson
- Opening theme: "You're All I Need to Get By"; Performed by Kenny Lattimore & Chanté Moore
- Country of origin: United States
- Original language: English
- No. of seasons: 2
- No. of episodes: 22

Production
- Executive producers: Terry Crews; Rebecca Crews; Robi Reed; D'Angela Proctor Steed; Nia T. Hill
- Running time: 30 minutes (including commercials)
- Production company: Strange Fruit Media

Original release
- Network: BET
- Release: February 21, 2010 – May 15, 2011

The Family Crews is an American reality television series following the life of comic actor Terry Crews, his wife Rebecca, and their family. The show premiered on BET on Sunday, February 21, 2010. The show was renewed for a second season, which premiered on March 6, 2011.

== Season 1 (2010) ==
=== Episode 3: Burn Baby Burn ===
Terry Crews made his appointment for swimming classes at a Milford high school. When he was 19, he directed a film titled “Hey, Mom, I Got Crews Comin’ In”, which he got his debuted stage last name Crews derived from.
