= Terry Crews =

American actor and football player (born 1968)

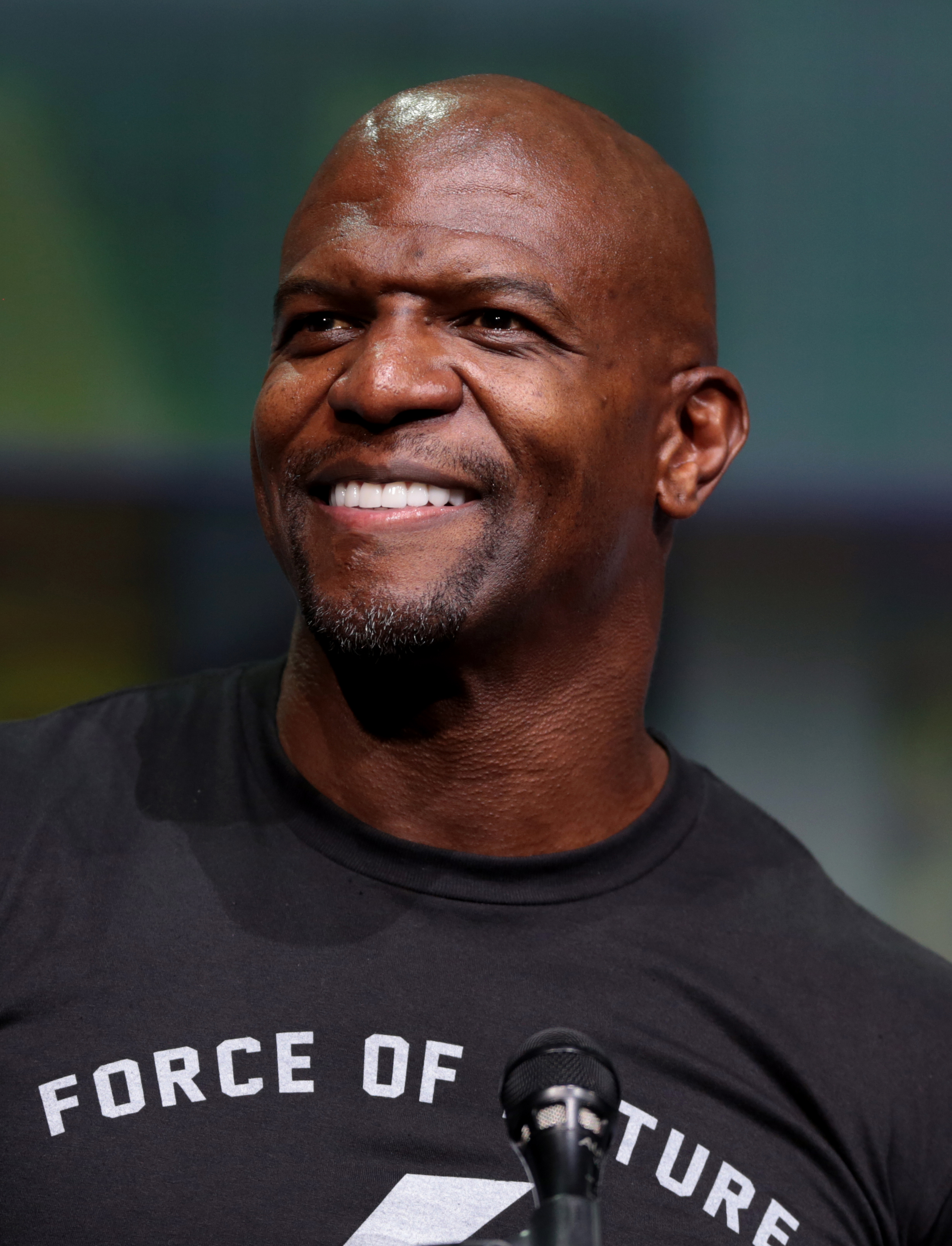
- Crews at the 2017 San Diego Comic-Con
- Born: Terry Alan Crews; July 30, 1968 (age 58); Flint, Michigan, U.S.
- Occupations: Actor; television host; football player; illustrator
- Years active: 1991–1997 (football); 1999–present (acting)
- Spouse: Rebecca King (m. 1989)
- Children: 5
- Football career

No. 51, 90, 94, 59
- Positions: Defensive end, linebacker

Personal information
- Listed height: 6 ft 2 in (1.88 m)
- Listed weight: 245 lb (111 kg)

Career information
- High school: Flint Southwestern Academy (Flint, Michigan)
- College: Western Michigan (1987–1990)
- NFL draft: 1991: 11th round, 281st overall pick

Career history
- Los Angeles Rams (1991); Green Bay Packers (1993)*; San Diego Chargers (1993); Rhein Fire (1995); Washington Redskins (1995); Philadelphia Eagles (1996)
- * Offseason or practice squad member only

Career NFL statistics
- Games played: 32
- Tackles: 3
- Assists: 1
- Stats at Pro Football Reference
- Terry Crews's voice Terry Crews speaks in support of the Sexual Assault Survivors Bill of Rights; Recorded June 26, 2018

Terry Alan Crews (born July 30, 1968) is an American actor, television host, and former professional football player.

He played Julius Rock in the UPN/CW sitcom Everybody Hates Chris, which aired from 2005 to 2009, reprised the role in the animated revival Everybody Still Hates Chris (2024-), and portrayed Terry Jeffords in the Fox and NBC sitcom Brooklyn Nine-Nine (2013–2021). Crews starred in the BET reality series The Family Crews (2010–2011) and hosted the American version of the game show Who Wants to Be a Millionaire from 2014 to 2015. He has appeared in films, including Friday After Next (2002), White Chicks (2004), Idiocracy (2006), Blended (2014), The Expendables film series (2010–2014), and Rumble (2021). Crews began hosting America's Got Talent in 2019, following his involvement in the same role for the program's spin-off series America's Got Talent: The Champions.

Crews played as a defensive end and linebacker in the National Football League (NFL) for the Los Angeles Rams, San Diego Chargers, and Washington Redskins, as well as in the World League of American Football (WLAF) for the Rhein Fire and college football at Western Michigan University.

A public advocate for women's rights and activist against sexism, Crews has shared stories of the abuse his family endured at the hands of his violent father, and was also included among the group of people named as Time Person of the Year in 2017 for going public with stories of sexual assault during the MeToo movement.

== Early life and education ==
Crews was born on July 30, 1968 in Flint, Michigan; he is the son of Patricia Ann (née Simpson) and Terry Crews. The middle child of three, he grew up in a strict Christian household in Flint and was raised mainly by his mother, who was 18 when he was born. His father was an alcoholic and abusive to his mother. Crews received a flute from his great-aunt, and took lessons for eight years. He spent a summer at Interlochen Arts Academy and entered Western Michigan University in Kalamazoo on an art scholarship. After his freshman year, he tried out for the football team and earned a full athletic scholarship.

== Football career ==
Crews was drafted by the Los Angeles Rams in the 11th round of the 1991 NFL draft. His career included stints with the Rams (six games), the Green Bay Packers (no games), the San Diego Chargers (10 games), the Washington Redskins (16 games), and the Philadelphia Eagles (no games). He also played for the Rhein Fire of the World League of American Football (later NFL Europe) during its 1995 season. Repeatedly cut from rosters, Crews often supplemented his football income by receiving portrait commissions from teammates.

Pre-draft measurables
Height	Weight	Arm length	Hand span	40-yard dash	10-yard split	20-yard split	20-yard shuttle	Vertical jump	Broad jump	Bench press
6 ft 2 in (1.88 m)	237 lb (108 kg)	32 in (0.81 m)	10 1/2 in (0.27 m)	4.74 s	1.69 s	2.77 s	4.29 s	35.0 in (0.89 m)	9 ft 5 in (2.87 m)	22 reps
All values from NFL Combine

== Acting career ==
After retiring from the NFL in 1997, Crews moved to Los Angeles to pursue an acting career. He had a long-standing ambition to work in the film industry, but up until then had no plans to pursue acting, and simply wanting to be involved in some way. A year earlier, he co-wrote and co-produced the independent feature film Young Boys Incorporated. A self-funded production filmed in Detroit with an anti-drug message, the film drew on his own observations, as well as those of his friends and family. Despite describing it as a "horrible" film, he credits the experience with getting him interested in the film industry.

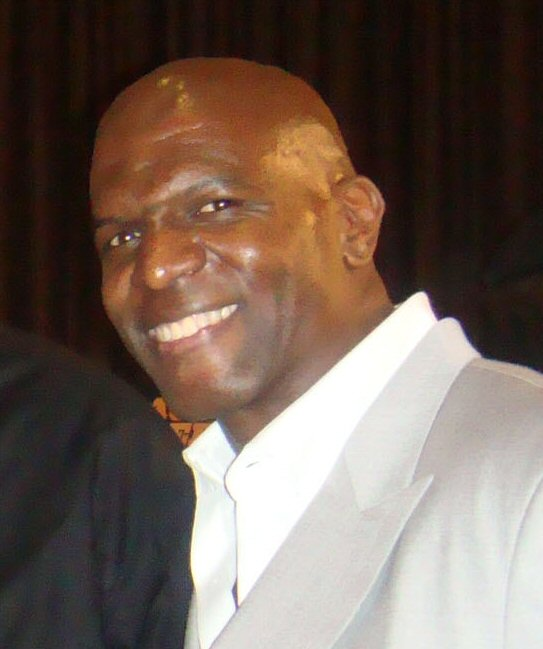
Crews in 2008

In 1999, Crews auditioned for a role as a character athlete (known as Warriors) in the syndicated game show Battle Dome, which became his first acting part. He played T-Money for two seasons until its cancellation in 2001. The audition process and the opportunity to perform in front of an audience made him realize that he wanted to pursue acting as a career. However, he failed to land another acting job for the following two years.

Appearances in commercials for products such as Old Spice, films, and music videos soon followed. His breakout role came in Friday After Next (2002) starring rapper-turned-actor Ice Cube, for whom Crews previously worked as on-set security. Having never taken acting classes, instead he asked himself what the audience wanted, and he believes this ultimately brought him success. He now believes acting is what he was born to do and would not wish to have any other career, despite the physically demanding nature of the work.

His role as Julius Rock, the father on the UPN/CW sitcom Everybody Hates Chris, brought Crews wider public recognition, and the series aired for four seasons from 2005 to 2009. Since then, Crews has had main roles as husband and father Nick Kingston-Persons in the TBS sitcom Are We There Yet?, which aired for three seasons from 2010, and as NYPD Sergeant (and commencing in Season 7, Lieutenant) Terry Jeffords in the Fox/NBC ensemble sitcom Brooklyn Nine-Nine, which aired from 2013 to 2021. In June 2020, Crews stated in an interview with Access Daily that four planned episodes for Season 8 had been aborted following the George Floyd protests, as the murder of George Floyd prompted the producers to reassess the direction of the season's storyline. The series was not renewed for a ninth season. In early 2021, Crews commented: "I'm sad it will end, but happy to have had the chance to be a part of something so special".

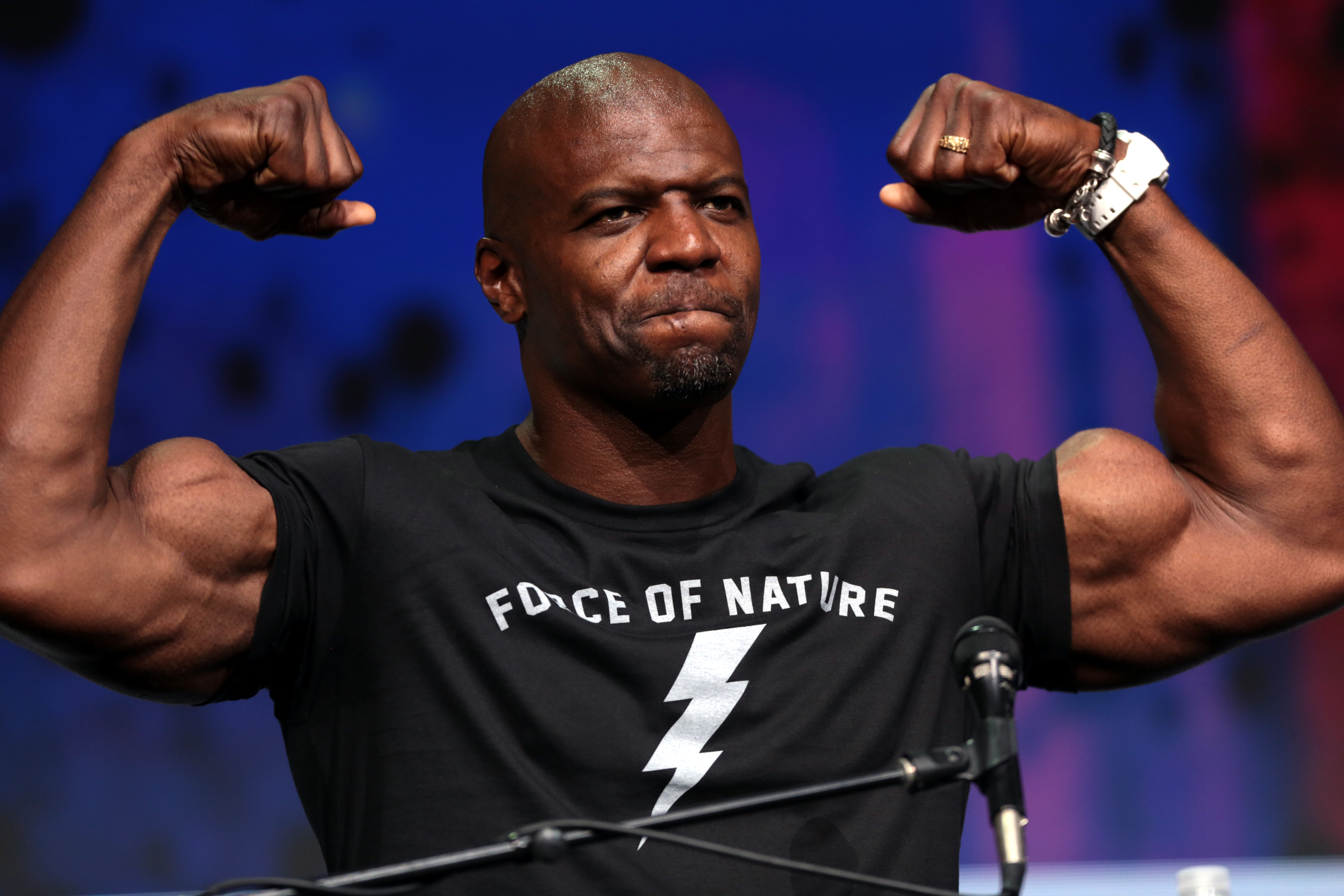
Crews has predominantly portrayed comedic characters, sometimes playing off his athletic physique.

Based on his performance in the film White Chicks (2004), Adam Sandler changed a role in The Longest Yard (2005) to give it to Crews, who auditioned for another role in the film. Crews has appeared mainly in comedic roles, such as Porter in Starsky & Hutch (2004), Steven in The Benchwarmers (2006), President Camacho in Idiocracy (2006), Big Jack Latimore in Norbit (2007), Agent 91 in Get Smart (2008), and Nickens in Blended (2014), but he later found success in action roles beginning with his part as Hale Caesar in The Expendables series (2010–2014), which saw him make his first appearance in a film sequel. Although he has managed to sustain an athletic physique in his career as an actor, Crews has avoided being type-cast as a muscle-bound action hero and has attained critical success through exploiting the contrast of his elaborate character comedy with his physique, which extends to the point of even mocking the stereotype of the gym-obsessed bodybuilder. This contrast has also led to sustained work as part of various humorous Old Spice TV commercials.

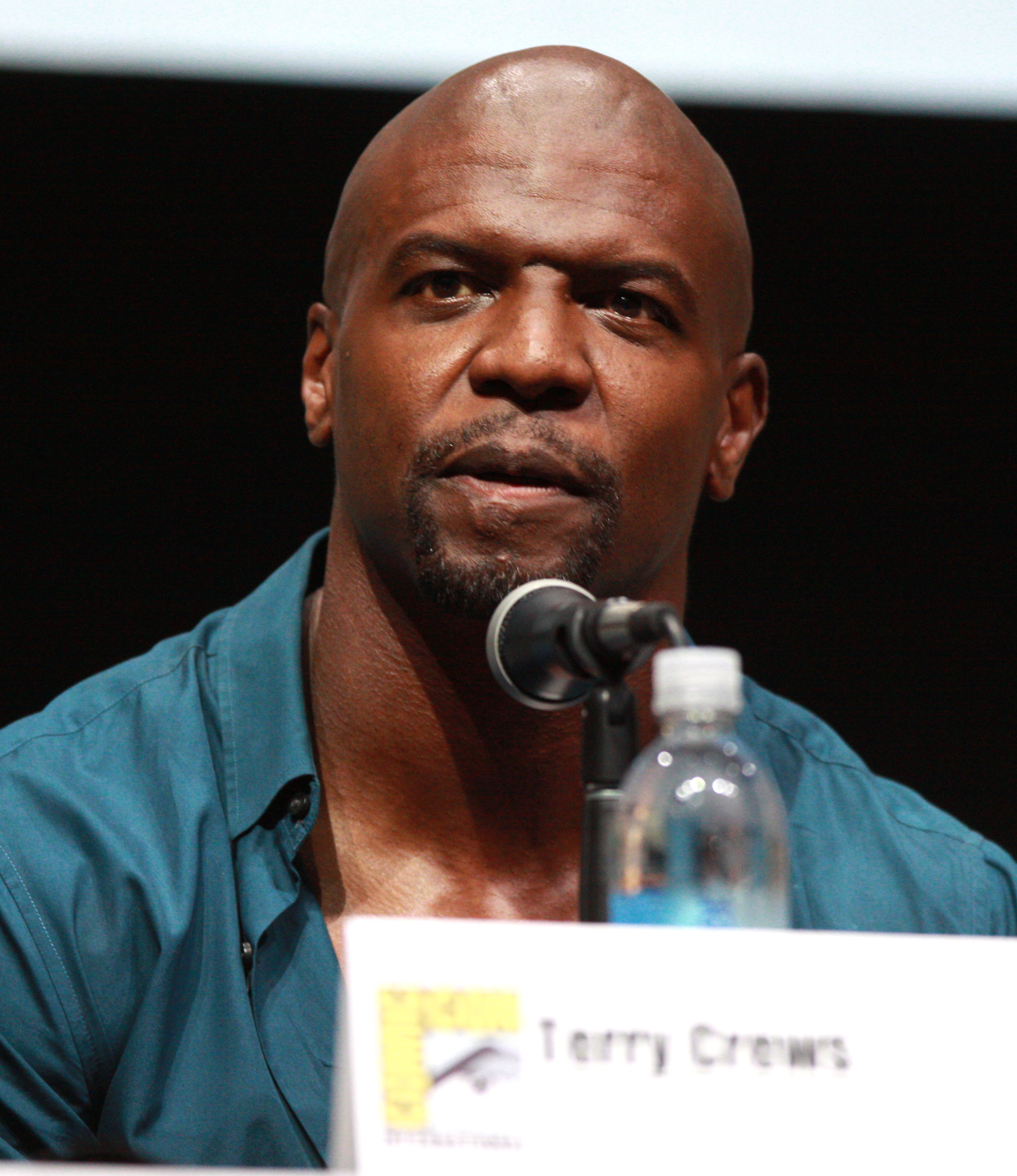
Crews at San Diego Comic-Con in 2013

He has lent his voice to animations such as American Dad! (2011–2022), Cloudy with a Chance of Meatballs 2 (2013), and Rumble (2021). He found that he enjoyed the work and sought out more of it, finding satisfaction in how it carries his spirit into the animation. From 2010 to 2011, Crews starred in his own reality series on BET, The Family Crews. It ran for two seasons. From 2014 to 2015, he hosted the syndicated game show Who Wants to Be a Millionaire. He has also been the American host of Netflix's Ultimate Beastmaster.

Crews cites the many similarities between acting and professional football, including the structure and expectations, as helping his transition between the two careers. He credits Reginald Hubbard with mentoring him in his early career in the film business.

In June 2017, he was cast in the science fiction comedy film Sorry to Bother You. The film was released in theaters on July 6, 2018. Also in 2018, he appeared as Bedlam in the superhero film Deadpool 2. Crews made appearances in the music videos for "Pressure" and "Algorithm" by British rock band Muse.

Crews also starred in the video for Brittany Howard's 2019 song "Stay High" in which he lip-syncs the vocals.

== Other ventures ==
=== Illustration and portraiture ===
Crews's first job in the arts was as a courtroom sketch artist in Flint, Michigan. He received an art scholarship from college before an athletic scholarship. He later worked as courtroom sketch artist for WJRT. During his football career, Crews supplemented his income by creating portraits of fellow players. At times it was the primary income on which his family depended, typically bringing $5,000 (around $11,000 in 2026) for a two-month commission. His work included a series of NFL-licensed lithographs. He believes his imaginative side has transferred itself to his acting work.

=== Design ===
Crews and fashion designer Nana Boateng founded a design company called Amen & Amen. Their first collection was a set of furniture and light fixtures by the designer and artist Ini Archibong. In 2017 Crews designed a collection of furniture for Bernhardt Design which was shown at the International Contemporary Furniture Fair (ICFF) in New York.

=== Film production ===
In 2021, Crews announced that Amen & Amen had entered the film production sector as a "virtual production studio" based in Pasadena, California.

=== Writing ===
In 2021 Crews and his wife Rebecca King wrote a memoir titled Together: How Fame, Failure and Faith Transformed Our Lives. He has written several other books including Tough: My Journey to True Power. He has also written and illustrated children's books including Terry's Crew, and with Ken Harvey, Come Find Me, a story about the adventures of two brothers, Anthony and Marcus, who are based on Crews' sons.

=== Food manufacturing ===
Together with Unnar Helgi Danielsson, Dylan Sprouse and Hafþór Júlíus Björnsson, Crews is a co-founder and brand ambassador of Thor's Skyr, an American-made high-protein cultured dairy product based on a traditional Icelandic recipe, which is high in probiotics and low in sugar.

=== Cryptocurrency ===
On March 10, 2021, Crews announced the Ethereum-based cryptocurrency $POWER.

== Personal life ==
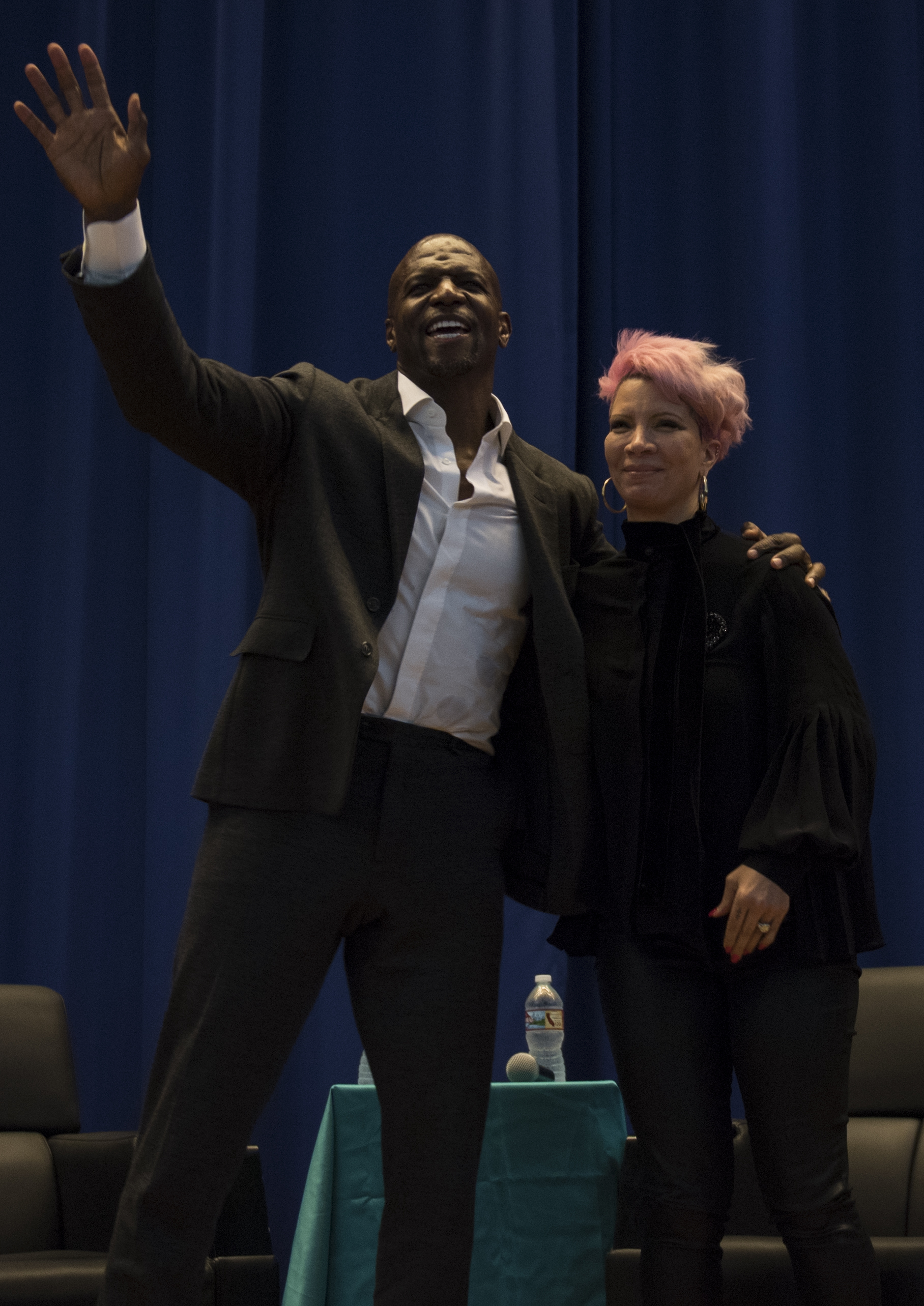
Crews with his wife Rebecca in 2019

Crews is a devout Christian. He met Rebecca King when he was a college sophomore; she was the music minister at a local church. They married on July 29, 1989. They have four daughters and a son, Isaiah Crews, also an actor, and one grandchild.

In 2014, Crews released his autobiography, Manhood: How to Be a Better Man or Just Live with One. In the book, Crews detailed his long-standing pornography addiction, which had seriously affected his marriage and his life, but which he overcame around 2009 and 2010 after entering rehabilitation. Crews stated he was raised in an "ultra-religious" household with an abusive father and that he had been using pornography since 8 years old to cope with the abuse. Since then he has taken an active role in speaking out about the condition and its impact, including posting on Facebook in his Dirty Little Secret Series.

Crews is very keen on personal development and his favorite book is The Master Key System by Charles F. Haanel: "I have read hundreds of personal development books, but this is the one that clearly showed me how to visualize, contemplate, and focus on what I truly wanted. It revealed to me that we only get what we desire most, and to apply myself with a laserlike focus upon a goal, task or project. That in order to 'have', you must 'do', and in order to 'do', you must 'be' – and this process is immediate. [...] I also reread it probably once a month to keep my vision clear".

On an interview with Rotten Tomatoes in 2020, Crews listed his five favorite films as Do the Right Thing, Star Wars, Aliens, Training Day and Pulp Fiction.

Crews appeared at the launch of the Cadillac F1 Team, where he spoke about his childhood in Detroit. He cited the many years that his father worked at General Motors, of which Cadillac is a subsidiary.

=== Sexual assault of Crews ===
On October 10, 2017, in the wake of numerous Hollywood actresses going public with their stories of sexual harassment and assault by film producer Harvey Weinstein, Crews revealed that a male Hollywood executive groped him at a party in 2016, but he did not report the incident for fear of retaliation. It was later revealed that the "high-level executive" was Adam Venit, head of the motion picture department of the talent company William Morris Endeavor (WME).

For his part in coming forward with the sexual assault allegations, Crews was named as one of the "Silence Breakers" from the Time Person of the Year award in 2017. WME reportedly concluded from an investigation that the incident was isolated. Venit was demoted and returned to work after a one-month suspension. In response, Crews stated, "Someone got a pass". Crews filed a lawsuit against Venit and WME for sexual assault. Some witnesses stated that Venit had gotten intoxicated, dismissed the groping as "horseplay", and apologized to Crews the next day. WME responded to the lawsuit, arguing that their reaction to Crews's claims was "both swift and serious". In March 2018, prosecutors decided not to file any charges against Venit. The city attorney's office announced that the statute of limitations to prosecute Venit had expired, as the alleged incident was in February 2016 and Crews did not report it until November 2017.

After Crews said that producer Avi Lerner attempted to silence him on the assault in order to retain his role in The Expendables film series, Crews vowed not to appear in any further installments of the franchise.
