= The Police discography =

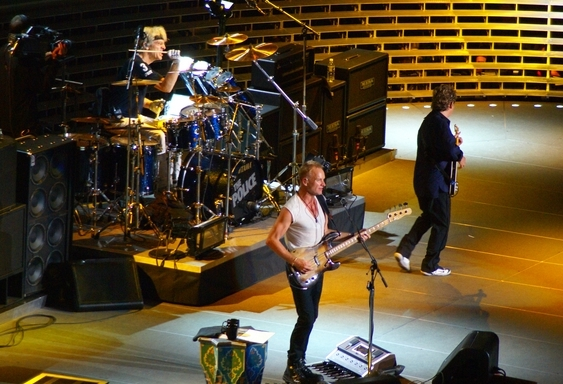
- The Police performing live on 1 August 2007 at Madison Square Garden, New York City
- Studio albums: 5
- Extended plays: 1
- Soundtrack albums: 4
- Live albums: 3
- Compilation albums: 7
- Singles: 26
- Video albums: 14
- Music videos: 18
- Box sets: 3

The English rock band the Police has released five studio albums, three live albums, seven compilation albums, fourteen video albums, four soundtrack albums and twenty-six singles. The Police sold over 75 million records worldwide, making them one of the best-selling music artists of all time.

== Albums ==
=== Studio albums ===
The Police studio albums
Title	Album details	Peak chart positions										Certifications
Title	Album details	UK	AUS	CAN	GER	JPN	NED	NZ	SPA	SWE	US	Certifications
Outlandos d'Amour	Released: 17 November 1978; Label: A&M	6	15	22	—	—	2	6	—	—	23	UK: Platinum; AUS: Platinum; CAN: Platinum; GER: Gold; NLD: Platinum; US: Platinum
Reggatta de Blanc	Released: 5 October 1979; Label: A&M	1	1	3	16	—	1	4	2	21	25	UK: Platinum; AUS: Platinum; CAN: Platinum; GER: Gold; NLD: Platinum; NZ: Platinum; US: Platinum
Zenyatta Mondatta	Released: 3 October 1980; Label: A&M	1	1	2	5	16	2	3	1	8	5	UK: Platinum; AUS: Platinum; CAN: Platinum; GER: Gold; NZ: Platinum; US: 2× Platinum
Ghost in the Machine	Released: 2 October 1981; Label: A&M	1	1	1	4	29	1	5	2	6	2	UK: Platinum; CAN: Platinum; GER: Gold; NZ: Platinum; US: 3× Platinum
Synchronicity	Released: 17 June 1983; Label: A&M	1	1	1	3	17	2	1	1	4	1	UK: Platinum; CAN: Platinum; GER: Gold; NLD: Gold; NZ: Platinum; US: 8× Platinum
"—" denotes items that did not chart or were not released in that territory.

=== Live albums ===
The Police live albums
Title	Album details	Peak chart positions										Certifications
Title	Album details	UK	BEL	CAN	FIN	GER	NED	NZ	SPA	SCO	US	Certifications
Live!	Released: 30 May 1995; Label: A&M	25	41	57	27	43	17	36	30	39	86	US: Platinum
Certifiable: Live in Buenos Aires	Released: 11 November 2008; Label: A&M	—	—	—	—	25	43	—	—	—	—	
Around the World	Released: 20 May 2022; Label: Mercury	—	37	—	—	9	68	—	78	—	—	
"—" denotes items that did not chart or were not released in that territory.

=== Compilation albums ===
The Police compilation albums
Title	Album details	Peak chart positions										Certifications
Title	Album details	UK	AUS	AUT	CAN	FRA	GER	ITA	NED	NZ	US	Certifications
Every Breath You Take: The Singles	Released: 31 October 1986; Label: A&M	1	4	20	11	—	18	—	11	1	7	UK: 4× Platinum; CAN: Platinum; NZ: Platinum; US: 5× Platinum
Their Greatest Hits	Released: 12 October 1990; Label: A&M	—	—	—	—	—	5	4	7	28	—	GER: Gold; NLD: Gold
Greatest Hits	Released: 28 September 1992; Label: A&M	10	16	66	24	70	5	—	—	1	141	UK: 3× Platinum; AUS: 5× Platinum; CAN: Platinum; NZ: Platinum
Every Breath You Take: The Classics	Released: March 1995; Label: A&M	—	—	—	—	—	65	—	—	—	—	
The Very Best of Sting & The Police	Released: 10 November 1997; Label: A&M	11	22	4	66	—	18	9	17	5	—	AUS: Gold; AUT: Gold; GER: Gold; ITA: Gold; NZ: Gold
The Very Best of Sting & The Police (updated)	Released: 18 February 2002; Label: A&M	1	—	—	—	—	59	4	69	17	46	UK: 5× Platinum; US: Gold
The Police	Released: 11 June 2007; Label: A&M	3	17	65	—	—	78	26	5	4	11	UK: Platinum; CAN: Gold; NZ: Gold
Flexible Strategies	Released: 16 November 2018; Label: A&M; Part of the complete studio recordings box set, also released separately	—	—	—	—	—	—	—	—	—	—	—
"—" denotes items that did not chart or were not released in that territory.

=== Box sets ===
The Police box sets
Title	Album details	Peaks			Certifications
Title	Album details	UK	FRA	US	Certifications
Six Pack	Released: 30 May 1980; Label: A&M	17	—	—	
Message in a Box: The Complete Recordings	Released: 27 September 1993; Label: A&M	—	—	79	CAN: Gold; US: Platinum
Every Move You Make: The Studio Recordings	Released: 16 November 2018; Label: A&M	17	188	—	
"—" denotes items that did not chart or were not released in that territory.

- The Six Pack collection was listed as a hit single for The Police in 1980 (under 2021 Official Chart rules it would be now categorised as an album)

== Extended plays ==
The Police extended plays
Title	EP details	Peaks
Title	EP details	UK
Voices Inside My Head (Remixes)	Released: 22 May 1995; Label: A&M	100

== Singles ==
The Police singles
Year	Title	Peak chart positions										Certifications	Album
Year	Title	UK	AUS	BEL	CAN	GER	IRE	ITA	NED	NZ	US	Certifications	Album
1977	"Fall Out"	—	—	—	—	—	—	—	—	—	—		non-album single
1978	"Roxanne"	—	—	—	—	—	—	—	—	—	—		Outlandos d'Amour
1978	"Can't Stand Losing You"	42	—	—	—	—	—	—	—	—	—	NZ: Gold	Outlandos d'Amour
1978	"So Lonely"	—	—	—	—	—	—	—	26	—	—	NZ: Gold	Outlandos d'Amour
1979	"Roxanne" (re-issue)	12	34	—	31	—	22	—	19	8	32	UK: 2× Platinum	Outlandos d'Amour
1979	"Can't Stand Losing You" (re-issue)	2	98	15	—	—	7	—	10	48	—	UK: Silver	Outlandos d'Amour
1979	"Message in a Bottle"	1	5	5	2	35	1	21	4	11	74	UK: Platinum; NZ: 3× Platinum	Reggatta de Blanc
1979	"Fall Out" (re-issue)	47	—	—	—	—	—	—	—	—	—		non-album single
1979	"Walking on the Moon"	1	9	16	65	—	1	—	8	12	—	UK: Gold; NZ: Platinum	Reggatta de Blanc
1979	"Bring on the Night"	—	—	—	—	—	—	—	—	—	—		Reggatta de Blanc
1980	"So Lonely" (re-issue)	6	99	—	—	—	7	—	—	—	—	UK: Silver	Outlandos d'Amour
1980	"The Bed's Too Big Without You"	—	—	—	—	—	—	—	—	—	—		Reggatta de Blanc
1980	"Don't Stand So Close to Me"	1	3	8	2	23	1	3	3	2	10	UK: Gold	Zenyatta Mondatta
1980	"De Do Do Do, De Da Da Da"	5	6	13	5	15	2	17	10	8	10	CAN: Gold	Zenyatta Mondatta
1981	"Invisible Sun"	2	89	—	—	—	5	—	27	—	—	UK: Silver	Ghost in the Machine
1981	"Every Little Thing She Does Is Magic"	1	2	3	1	21	1	2	1	7	3	UK: Platinum; NZ: 3× Platinum	Ghost in the Machine
1981	"Spirits in the Material World"	12	50	8	13	44	6	—	8	—	11	UK: Silver	Ghost in the Machine
1982	"Secret Journey"	—	—	—	—	—	—	—	—	—	46		Ghost in the Machine
1983	"Every Breath You Take"	1	2	9	1	8	1	3	3	6	1	UK: 4× Platinum; ITA: 2× Platinum; NZ: 7× Platinum; US: Gold	Synchronicity
1983	"Wrapped Around Your Finger"	7	26	15	10	32	1	13	24	22	8	NZ: Gold	Synchronicity
1983	"Synchronicity II"	17	—	—	21	—	12	—	—	—	16		Synchronicity
1983	"King of Pain"	17	44	19	1	57	7	—	—	—	3		Synchronicity
1986	"Don't Stand So Close to Me '86"	24	32	21	27	—	11	—	19	14	46	NZ: Platinum	Every Breath You Take: The Singles
1995	"Can't Stand Losing You" (Live)	27	—	—	—	—	—	—	—	—	—		Live!
1997	"Roxanne '97" (Remix feat. Puff Daddy)	17	—	—	—	—	—	24	69	10	59	NZ: 4× Platinum	The Very Best of Sting & The Police
2000	"When the World Is Running Down" (Different Gear vs. The Police)	28	—	—	—	—	—	—	94	—	—		non-album single
"—" denotes items that did not chart or were not released in that territory.

== Video albums, music video compilations and documentaries ==
- Around the World (1982) (VHS / Laserdisc (Japan)) (Note: Filmed between February 1980 and January 1981, this documentary Around The World presents a selection of live performances, behind the scenes material and The Police filming promotional videos.)
- Synchronicity Concert (1984) (VHS) - AUS: Platinum
- Every Breath You Take: The Videos (1986) (VHS) - AUS: Gold
- Greatest Hits (1992) (VHS / Laserdisc)
- Outlandos to Synchronicities – A History of The Police Live! (1995) (VHS)
- The Very Best of Sting & The Police (1997) (VHS)
- Every Breath You Take: The DVD (2003) (DVD)
- Synchronicity Concert (2005) (DVD / UMD)
- Everyone Stares: The Police Inside Out (2006) (DVD)
- Better Than Therapy (2008) (DVD)
- Certifiable: Live in Buenos Aires (2008) (DVD)
- Can't Stand Losing You: Surviving The Police (2012) (DVD)
- Rock'n Roll... Of Corse! (2017) (DVD)
- Around the World (Restored & Expanded) (2022) (DVD / Blu-ray) (Note: This 2022 re-release of Around the World promotes its improved picture and sound quality with the "restored & expanded" label, but fails to mention that various parts of the original release are actually cut.)

== Music videos ==
Year	Video	Director	Album
1978	"Roxanne" (2 versions)	Derek Burbidge	Outlandos d'Amour
1978	"Can't Stand Losing You" (2 versions)	Derek Burbidge	Outlandos d'Amour
1979	"Message in a Bottle"	Derek Burbidge	Reggatta de Blanc
1979	"Walking on the Moon"	Derek Burbidge	Reggatta de Blanc
1979	"The Bed's Too Big Without You"	David Mallet	Reggatta de Blanc
1980	"So Lonely"	Derek Burbidge	Outlandos d'Amour
1980	"Don't Stand So Close to Me" (2 versions)	Derek Burbidge	Zenyatta Mondatta
1980	"De Do Do Do, De Da Da Da"	Derek Burbidge	Zenyatta Mondatta
1981	"Spirits in the Material World"	Derek Burbidge	Ghost in the Machine
1981	"One World (Not Three)"	Derek Burbidge	Ghost in the Machine
1981	"Demolition Man"	Derek Burbidge	Ghost in the Machine
1981	"Every Little Thing She Does Is Magic"	Derek Burbidge	Ghost in the Machine
1982	"Invisible Sun"	Derek Burbidge	Ghost in the Machine
1983	"Every Breath You Take"	Godley & Creme	Synchronicity
1983	"Wrapped Around Your Finger"	Godley & Creme	Synchronicity
1983	"Synchronicity II"	Godley & Creme	Synchronicity
1983	"King of Pain"	Godley & Creme	Synchronicity
1986	"Don't Stand So Close to Me '86"	Godley & Creme	Every Breath You Take: The Singles

== See also ==
- Sting discography
