= List of songs recorded by the Police =

Songs recorded by English rock band

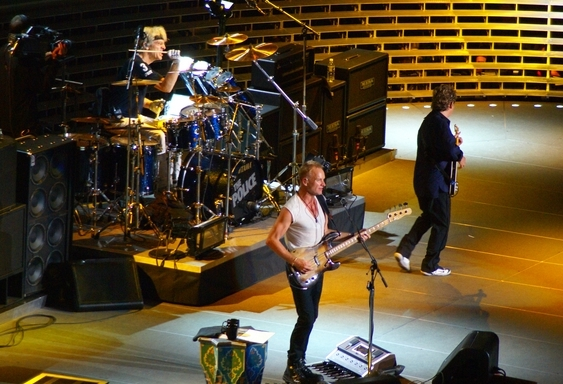
Stewart Copeland (drums), Sting (front), and Andy Summers (right)

A list of songs recorded by English rock band the Police.

Key
†, indicates single release

Name of song, writer(s), original release, and year of release
Song	Writer(s)	Original release	Year	Ref.
"Be My Girl – Sally"	Sting; Andy Summers (Note: "Be My Girl" by Sting; "Sally" by Andy Summers)	Outlandos d'Amour	1978	
"The Bed's Too Big Without You"	Sting	Reggatta de Blanc	1979	
"Behind My Camel"	Andy Summers	Zenyatta Mondatta	1980	
"Bombs Away"	Stewart Copeland	Zenyatta Mondatta	1980	
"Born in the '50s"	Sting	Outlandos d'Amour	1978	
"Bring On the Night" †	Sting	Reggatta de Blanc	1979	
"Can't Stand Losing You" †	Sting	Outlandos d'Amour	1978	
"Canary in a Coalmine"	Sting	Zenyatta Mondatta	1980	
"Contact"	Stewart Copeland	Reggatta de Blanc	1979	
"Darkness"	Stewart Copeland	Ghost in the Machine	1981	
"De Do Do Do, De Da Da Da" †	Sting	Zenyatta Mondatta	1980	
"Dead End Job" †	Sting; Stewart Copeland	Non-album single B-side of "Can't Stand Losing You"	1978	
"Deathwish"	Sting; Andy Summers; Stewart Copeland	Reggatta de Blanc	1979	
"Demolition Man"	Sting	Ghost in the Machine	1981	
"Does Everyone Stare"	Stewart Copeland	Reggatta de Blanc	1979	
"Don't Stand So Close to Me" (Note: The song was re-recorded and re-released in 1986 as "Don't Stand So Close to Me '86".) †	Sting	Zenyatta Mondatta	1980	
"Driven to Tears"	Sting	Zenyatta Mondatta	1980	
"Every Breath You Take" †	Sting	Synchronicity	1983	
"Every Little Thing She Does Is Magic" †	Sting	Ghost in the Machine	1981	
"Fall Out" †	Stewart Copeland	Non-album single	1977	
"Flexible Strategies" †	Sting; Andy Summers; Stewart Copeland	Non-album single B-side of "Every Little Thing She Does Is Magic"	1981	
"Friends" †	Andy Summers	Non-album single B-side of "Don't Stand So Close to Me"	1980	
"Hole in My Life"	Sting	Outlandos d'Amour	1978	
"How Stupid Mr. Bates"	Andy Summers; Sting; Stewart Copeland	Brimstone and Treacle	1982	
"Hungry for You (J'aurais toujours faim de toi)"	Sting	Ghost in the Machine	1981	
"I Burn for You"	Sting	Brimstone and Treacle	1982	
"Invisible Sun" †	Sting	Ghost in the Machine	1981	
"It's Alright for You"	Sting; Stewart Copeland	Reggatta de Blanc	1979	
"A Kind of Loving"	Andy Summers; Sting; Stewart Copeland	Brimstone and Treacle	1982	
"King of Pain" †	Sting	Synchronicity	1983	
"Landlord" †	Sting; Stewart Copeland	Non-album single B-side of "Message in a Bottle"	1979	
"Low Life" †	Sting	Non-album single B-side of "Spirits in the Material World"	1981	
"Man in a Suitcase"	Sting	Zenyatta Mondatta	1980	
"Masoko Tanga"	Sting	Outlandos d'Amour	1978	
"Message in a Bottle" †	Sting	Reggatta de Blanc	1979	
"Miss Gradenko"	Stewart Copeland	Synchronicity	1983	
"Mother"	Andy Summers	Synchronicity	1983	
"Murder by Numbers" †	Sting; Andy Summers	Non-album single B-side of "Every Breath You Take"	1983	
"Next to You"	Sting	Outlandos d'Amour	1978	
"No Time This Time"	Sting	Reggatta de Blanc	1979	
"Nothing Achieving" †	Stewart Copeland; Ian Copeland	Non-album single B-side of "Fall Out"	1977	
"O My God"	Sting	Synchronicity	1983	
"Ωmegaman"	Andy Summers	Ghost in the Machine	1981	
"On Any Other Day"	Stewart Copeland	Reggatta de Blanc	1979	
"Once Upon a Daydream" †	Sting; Andy Summers	Non-album single B-side of "Synchronicity II"	1983	
"One World (Not Three)"	Sting	Ghost in the Machine	1981	
"The Other Way of Stopping"	Stewart Copeland	Zenyatta Mondatta	1980	
"Peanuts"	Sting; Stewart Copeland	Outlandos d'Amour	1978	
"Reggatta de Blanc"	Sting; Andy Summers; Stewart Copeland	Reggatta de Blanc	1979	
"Rehumanize Yourself"	Sting; Stewart Copeland	Ghost in the Machine	1981	
"Roxanne" †	Sting	Outlandos d'Amour	1978	
"Secret Journey" †	Sting	Ghost in the Machine	1981	
"A Sermon" †	Stewart Copeland	Non-album single B-side of "Don't Stand So Close to Me"	1980	
"Shadows in the Rain"	Sting	Zenyatta Mondatta	1980	
"Shambelle" †	Andy Summers	Non-album single B-side of "Every Little Thing She Does Is Magic" (US) / "Invisible Sun" (UK)	1981	
"So Lonely" †	Sting	Outlandos d'Amour	1978	
"Someone to Talk to" †	Andy Summers	Non-album single B-side of "Wrapped Around Your Finger"	1983	
"Spirits in the Material World" †	Sting	Ghost in the Machine	1981	
"Synchronicity I"	Sting	Synchronicity	1983	
"Synchronicity II" †	Sting	Synchronicity	1983	
"Tea in the Sahara" (Note: A live version of "Tea in the Sahara" was released as the B-side to "King of Pain".)	Sting	Synchronicity	1983	
"Too Much Information"	Sting	Ghost in the Machine	1981	
"Truth Hits Everybody"	Sting	Outlandos d'Amour	1978	
"Visions of the Night" †	Sting	Non-album single B-side of "Walking on the Moon"	1979	
"Voices Inside My Head"	Sting	Zenyatta Mondatta	1980	
"Walking in Your Footsteps"	Sting	Synchronicity	1983	
"Walking on the Moon" †	Sting	Reggatta de Blanc	1979	
"When the World Is Running Down, You Make the Best of What's Still Around"	Sting	Zenyatta Mondatta	1980	
"Wrapped Around Your Finger" †	Sting	Synchronicity	1983	
