= Every Move You Make: The Studio Recordings =

Box set by The Police
- Released: 16 November 2018
- Label: A&M
- Producers: The Police; Nigel Gray; Hugh Padgham

The Police chronology
Certifiable: Live in Buenos Aires (2008)	Every Move You Make: The Studio Recordings (2018)	The Police Around the World (2022)

Every Move You Make: The Studio Recordings is a box set by English rock band the Police. It was initially released on vinyl on 16 November 2018 through A&M Records. A CD boxed set followed on 19 November 2019. It is the band's second career-spanning box set after the 1993 release Message in a Box: The Complete Recordings. Every Move You Make contains the band's five studio albums—Outlandos d'Amour (1978), Regatta de Blanc (1979), Zenyatta Mondatta (1980), Ghost in the Machine (1981), and Synchronicity (1983)—in addition to a new compilation, Flexible Strategies, containing B-sides not included on their studio albums.

== Track listing ==
Outlandos d'Amour (1978)
No.	Title	Writer(s)	Length
1.	"Next to You"	Sting	2:50
2.	"So Lonely"	Sting	4:50
3.	"Roxanne"	Sting	3:12
4.	"Hole in My Life"	Sting	4:55
5.	"Peanuts"	Sting; Stewart Copeland	4:02
6.	"Can't Stand Losing You"	Sting	2:59
7.	"Truth Hits Everybody"	Sting	2:55
8.	"Born in the 50's"	Sting	3:45
9.	"Be My Girl—Sally"	Sting; Andy Summers	3:24
10.	"Masoko Tanga"	Sting	5:42
Total length:			38:14

Reggatta de Blanc (1979)
No.	Title	Writer(s)	Length
1.	"Message in a Bottle"	Sting	4:51
2.	"Reggatta de Blanc"	Summers; Sting; Copeland	3:06
3.	"It's Alright for You"	Sting; Copeland	3:13
4.	"Bring On the Night"	Sting	4:15
5.	"Deathwish"	Summers; Sting; Copeland	4:13
6.	"Walking on the Moon"	Sting	5:02
7.	"On Any Other Day"	Copeland	2:57
8.	"The Bed's Too Big Without You"	Sting	4:26
9.	"Contact"	Copeland	2:38
10.	"Does Everyone Stare"	Copeland	3:52
11.	"No Time This Time"	Sting	3:17
Total length:			41:52

Zenyatta Mondatta (1980)
No.	Title	Writer(s)	Length
1.	"Don't Stand So Close to Me"	Sting	4:04
2.	"Driven to Tears"	Sting	3:20
3.	"When the World Is Running Down, You Make the Best of What's Still Around"	Sting	3:38
4.	"Canary in a Coalmine"	Sting	2:26
5.	"Voices Inside My Head"	Sting	3:53
6.	"Bombs Away"	Copeland	3:06
7.	"De Do Do Do, De Da Da Da"	Sting	4:09
8.	"Behind My Camel"	Summers	2:54
9.	"Man in a Suitcase"	Sting	2:19
10.	"Shadows in the Rain"	Sting	5:04
11.	"The Other Way of Stopping"	Copeland	3:22
Total length:			38:16

Ghost in the Machine (1981)
No.	Title	Writer(s)	Length
1.	"Spirits in the Material World"	Sting	2:59
2.	"Every Little Thing She Does Is Magic"	Sting	4:22
3.	"Invisible Sun"	Sting	3:44
4.	"Hungry for You (J'aurais toujours faim de toi)"	Sting	2:52
5.	"Demolition Man"	Sting	5:57
6.	"Too Much Information"	Sting	3:43
7.	"Rehumanize Yourself"	Sting; Copeland	3:10
8.	"One World (Not Three)"	Sting	4:47
9.	"Ωmegaman"	Summers	2:48
10.	"Secret Journey"	Sting	3:34
11.	"Darkness"	Copeland	3:14
Total length:			41:03

Synchronicity (1983)
No.	Title	Writer(s)	Length
1.	"Synchronicity I"	Sting	3:23
2.	"Walking in Your Footsteps"	Sting	3:36
3.	"O My God"	Sting	4:02
4.	"Mother"	Summers	3:05
5.	"Miss Gradenko"	Copeland	2:00
6.	"Synchronicity II"	Sting	5:00
7.	"Every Breath You Take"	Sting	4:13
8.	"King of Pain"	Sting	4:59
9.	"Wrapped Around Your Finger"	Sting	5:13
10.	"Tea in the Sahara"	Sting	4:11
Total length:			39:42

Flexible Strategies
No.	Title	Writer(s)	Length
1.	"Dead End Job" (B-side to "Can't Stand Losing You", 1978)	Summers; Sting; Copeland	3:35
2.	"Landlord" (B-side to "Message in a Bottle", 1979)	Sting; Copeland	3:07
3.	"Visions of the Night" (B-side to "Walking on the Moon", 1979)	Sting	3:06
4.	"Friends" (B-side to "Don't Stand So Close to Me", 1980)	Summers	3:36
5.	"A Sermon" (B-side to "De Do, Do, Do, De Da, Da, Da", 1980)	Copeland	2:32
6.	"Shambelle" (B-side to "Invisible Sun", 1981)	Summers	5:10
7.	"Flexible Strategies" (B-side to "Every Little Thing She Does Is Magic", 1981)	Summers; Sting; Copeland	3:42
8.	"Low Life" (B-side to "Spirits in the Material World", 1981)	Sting	3:46
9.	"Murder by Numbers" (B-side to "Every Breath You Take" / Synchronicity cassette and CD bonus track, 1983)	Summers; Sting	4:33
10.	"Truth Hits Everybody" (remix) (B-side to "Every Breath You Take", 1983)	Sting	3:47
11.	"Someone to Talk To" (B-side to "Wrapped Around Your Finger", 1983)	Summers	3:05
12.	"Once Upon a Daydream" (B-side to "Synchronicity II", 1983)	Summers; Sting	3:32
Total length:			43:35
