= Message in a Box: The Complete Recordings =

Box set by The Police
- Released: 27 September 1993
- Recorded: 1977–1986
- Genre: New wave
- Length: 287:02
- Label: A&M
- Producers: The Police, Nigel Gray, Hugh Padgham

The Police chronology
Greatest Hits (1992)	Message in a Box: The Complete Recordings (1993)	Live! (1995)

Message in a Box: The Complete Recordings is a four-CD box set by the Police, containing the contents of all five of their studio albums in chronological order, as well as non-album singles, non-album B-sides, and tracks from various compilation albums and the Brimstone & Treacle soundtrack (1982). The box set also comes with a 68-page booklet.

== Contents ==
The box set states that it 'contains every single song the Police ever released' but it excludes ten officially released tracks from before its release in 1993:

- "De Do Do Do, De Da Da Da" (Spanish Version) (4:00) and "De Do Do Do, De Da Da Da" (Japanese Version) (4:00) were released in the US in 1981 as a double A-side 7", with Sting singing the song in both Spanish and Japanese (AM-25000).
- "Truth Hits Everybody" (Remix) (3:30) appeared as the A-side of the bonus single, which was included in the UK 7" limited edition double pack of "Every Breath You Take" (AM 117/AM*01).
- "Every Breath You Take" (Backing Track) (4:05) and "Roxanne" (Backing Track) (3:11) were released in Japan in 1983 as a double A-side 7" (AMP-782).
- "Wrapped Around Your Finger" (Live Version) (5:22) from Atlanta in 1983 was included on the US 12" Promo of "Wrapped Around Your Finger" (SP-17264).
- "Don't Stand So Close to Me '86" (4:47) appeared as the A-side of the UK 7" of "Don't Stand So Close to Me '86" (AMY 354) and then released on the album Every Breath You Take: The Singles was not included on the UK version of the box set.
- "Don't Stand So Close to Me" (Live) (3:40) from Atlanta in 1983, appeared as the B-side of the UK 7" of "Don't Stand So Close to Me '86" (AMY 354).
- "Don't Stand So Close to Me '86" (Dance Mix) (6:32) appeared on the A-side of the UK 12" of "Don't Stand So Close to Me '86" (AMY 354) was not included on the US version of the box set. There is no edition of the box set that includes both the standard version and the Dance Mix of "Don't Stand So Close to Me '86".
- "Can't Stand Losing You" (Live) (5:30) from the Paris Theatre, London in 1979, appeared on the 1988 Strange Fruit Compilation UK CD 21 Years of Alternative Radio 1 (SFRCD 200).
- "Shambelle" (AMS 8164) misses the beginning high hat introduction played by Stewart Copeland making the song incomplete. The full version (5:10) was later released on the Every Move You Make: The Studio Recordings box set released in 2018.

== Reception ==
Professional ratings
Review scores
Source	Rating
Allmusic	4.5/5 stars
Rolling Stone	4/5 stars
Encyclopedia of Popular Music	5/5 stars

Allmusic gave resounding approval to the set, going so far as to claim that all 78 songs are "timeless classics," making it the ideal purchase for the casual listener. They also praised the booklet included, especially the Police biography, and asserted that the digital remastering is so superior to the sound quality of the original releases that they would recommend the purchase even to those who already have all the recordings on the box set.

== Track listing ==
Disc one
No.	Title	Writer(s)	Origin	Length
1.	"Fall Out"	Stewart Copeland	Non-album single, 1977	2:04
2.	"Nothing Achieving"	Ian Copeland, Copeland	B-side of "Fall Out", 1977	1:56
3.	"Dead End Job"	Sting, Copeland, Andy Summers	B-side of "Can't Stand Losing You" (UK) & "Roxanne" (US), 1978	3:35
4.	"Next to You"	Sting	Outlandos d'Amour, 1978	2:50
5.	"So Lonely"	Sting	Outlandos d'Amour	4:49
6.	"Roxanne"	Sting	Outlandos d'Amour	3:12
7.	"Hole in My Life"	Sting	Outlandos d'Amour	4:52
8.	"Peanuts"	Copeland, Sting	Outlandos d'Amour	3:58
9.	"Can't Stand Losing You"	Sting	Outlandos d'Amour	2:58
10.	"Truth Hits Everybody"	Sting	Outlandos d'Amour	2:53
11.	"Born in the 50s"	Sting	Outlandos d'Amour	3:40
12.	"Be My Girl – Sally"	Sting, Summers	Outlandos d'Amour	3:22
13.	"Masoko Tanga"	Sting	Outlandos d'Amour	5:40
14.	"Landlord" (live at The Bottom Line, New York, 4th April 1979)	Sting, Copeland	Propaganda – No Wave II, 1979	2:36
15.	"Next to You" (live at The Bottom Line, New York, 4th April 1979)	Sting	Propaganda – No Wave II	3:11
16.	"Landlord"	Sting, Copeland	B-side of "Message in a Bottle", 1979	3:09
17.	"Message in a Bottle"	Sting	Reggatta de Blanc, 1979	4:51
18.	"Reggatta de Blanc"	Copeland, Sting, Summers	Reggatta de Blanc	3:06
19.	"It's Alright for You"	Copeland, Sting	Reggatta de Blanc	3:13
20.	"Bring On the Night"	Sting	Reggatta de Blanc	4:16
21.	"Deathwish"	Copeland, Sting, Summers	Reggatta de Blanc	4:13

Disc two
No.	Title	Writer(s)	Origin	Length
1.	"Walking on the Moon"	Sting	Reggatta de Blanc	5:02
2.	"On Any Other Day"	Copeland	Reggatta de Blanc	2:57
3.	"The Bed's Too Big Without You"	Sting	Reggatta de Blanc	4:26
4.	"Contact"	Copeland	Reggatta de Blanc	2:38
5.	"Does Everyone Stare"	Copeland	Reggatta de Blanc	3:52
6.	"No Time This Time"	Sting	Reggatta de Blanc	3:17
7.	"Visions of the Night"	Sting	B-side of "Walking on the Moon" (UK) & "Bring On the Night" (US), 1979	3:05
8.	"The Bed's Too Big Without You" (mono)	Sting	Six Pack, 1980	3:29
9.	"Truth Hits Everybody" (live)	Sting	Six Pack	2:26
10.	"Friends"	Summers	B-side of "Don't Stand So Close to Me" (UK) & "De Do Do Do, De Da Da Da" (US), 1980	3:36
11.	"Don't Stand So Close to Me"	Sting	Zenyatta Mondatta, 1980	4:04
12.	"Driven to Tears"	Sting	Zenyatta Mondatta	3:20
13.	"When the World Is Running Down, You Make the Best of What's Still Around"	Sting	Zenyatta Mondatta	3:38
14.	"Canary in a Coalmine"	Sting	Zenyatta Mondatta	2:26
15.	"Voices Inside My Head"	Sting	Zenyatta Mondatta	3:53
16.	"Bombs Away"	Copeland	Zenyatta Mondatta	3:09
17.	"De Do Do Do, De Da Da Da"	Sting	Zenyatta Mondatta	4:09
18.	"Behind My Camel"	Summers	Zenyatta Mondatta	2:54
19.	"Man in a Suitcase"	Sting	Zenyatta Mondatta	2:19
20.	"Shadows in the Rain"	Sting	Zenyatta Mondatta	5:02
21.	"The Other Way of Stopping"	Copeland	Zenyatta Mondatta	3:22

Disc three
No.	Title	Writer(s)	Origin	Length
1.	"A Sermon"	Copeland	B-side of "De Do Do Do, De Da Da Da" (UK) & "Don't Stand So Close to Me" (US), 1980	2:33
2.	"Driven to Tears" (live)	Sting	Urgh! A Music War soundtrack, 1981	3:29
3.	"Shambelle"	Summers	B-side of "Invisible Sun" (UK) & "Every Little Thing She Does Is Magic" (US), 1981	5:00
4.	"Spirits in the Material World"	Sting	Ghost in the Machine, 1981	2:59
5.	"Every Little Thing She Does Is Magic"	Sting	Ghost in the Machine	4:22
6.	"Invisible Sun"	Sting	Ghost in the Machine	3:44
7.	"Hungry for You (J'aurais toujours faim de toi)"	Sting	Ghost in the Machine	2:53
8.	"Demolition Man"	Sting	Ghost in the Machine	5:57
9.	"Too Much Information"	Sting	Ghost in the Machine	3:43
10.	"Rehumanize Yourself"	Copeland, Sting	Ghost in the Machine	3:10
11.	"One World (Not Three)"	Sting	Ghost in the Machine	4:47
12.	"Omegaman"	Summers	Ghost in the Machine	2:48
13.	"Secret Journey"	Sting	Ghost in the Machine	3:34
14.	"Darkness"	Copeland	Ghost in the Machine	3:14
15.	"Flexible Strategies"	Sting, Summers, Copeland	B-side of "Every Little Thing She Does Is Magic" (UK) & "Spirits in the Material World" (US), 1981	3:43
16.	"Low Life"	Sting	B-side of "Spirits in the Material World" (UK), 1981	3:45
17.	"How Stupid Mr. Bates"	Sting, Summers, Copeland	Brimstone & Treacle soundtrack, 1982	2:41
18.	"A Kind of Loving"	Sting, Summers, Copeland	Brimstone & Treacle soundtrack	2:03

Disc four
No.	Title	Writer(s)	Origin	Length
1.	"Synchronicity I"	Sting	Synchronicity, 1983	3:23
2.	"Walking in Your Footsteps"	Sting	Synchronicity	3:36
3.	"O My God"	Sting	Synchronicity	4:02
4.	"Mother"	Summers	Synchronicity	3:05
5.	"Miss Gradenko"	Copeland	Synchronicity	1:59
6.	"Synchronicity II"	Sting	Synchronicity	5:02
7.	"Every Breath You Take"	Sting	Synchronicity	4:13
8.	"King of Pain"	Sting	Synchronicity	4:59
9.	"Wrapped Around Your Finger"	Sting	Synchronicity	5:13
10.	"Tea in the Sahara"	Sting	Synchronicity	4:19
11.	"Murder by Numbers"	Sting, Summers	B-side of "Every Breath You Take", 1983; also included in cassette and CD versions of Synchronicity	4:36
12.	"Man in a Suitcase" (live)	Sting	maxi-single of "Every Breath You Take" (UK), 1983	2:17
13.	"Someone to Talk To"	Summers	B-side of "Wrapped Around Your Finger", 1983	3:08
14.	"Message in a Bottle" (live)	Sting	maxi-single of "Wrapped Around Your Finger" (UK), 1983	4:51
15.	"I Burn for You"	Sting	Brimstone & Treacle soundtrack; also included in maxi-single of "Wrapped Around Your Finger" (UK)	4:49
16.	"Once Upon a Daydream"	Sting, Summers	B-side of "Synchronicity II", 1983	3:31
17.	"Tea in the Sahara" (live)	Sting	B-side of "King of Pain", 1984	5:06
18.	"Don't Stand So Close to Me '86"	Sting	Every Breath You Take: The Singles, 1986	4:51

== Personnel ==
The Police

- Stewart Copeland – drums, percussion, keyboards, backing vocals, guitar on "Fall Out", "Nothing Achieving", "It's Alright for You" and "A Sermon", lead vocal on "On Any Other Day", spoken word on "Does Everyone Stare"
- Sting – bass guitar, keyboards, saxophone, oboe, lead and backing vocals, harmonica on "So Lonely", drum machine on "Synchronicity I"
- Andy Summers – guitar, keyboards, bass guitar on "Behind My Camel", backing vocals, piano on "Does Everyone Stare" and "Be My Girl – Sally", spoken word on "Friends", "Dead End Job" and "Be My Girl – Sally", lead vocals on "Mother" and "Someone to Talk To"

Additional

- Henry Padovani – guitar on "Fall Out" and "Nothing Achieving"
- John Sinclair – piano on "Hole in My Life" and "Masoko Tanga"
- Jean Russell – piano on "Every Little Thing She Does is Magic"
- Olaf Kübler – saxophone on "Low Life"
- Suzanna Hamilton – screaming on "A Kind of Loving"

Production

- Dave Collins – Mastering
