= Certifiable: Live in Buenos Aires =

Live album by the Police
- Released: 11 November 2008
- Recorded: 1–2 December 2007
- Venues: River Plate Stadium, Buenos Aires, Argentina
- Genre: New wave
- Length: 107:51
- Labels: A&M; Cherrytree; Polydor; Universal
- Producer: Robert Orton

The Police chronology
The Police (2007)	Certifiable: Live in Buenos Aires (2008)	Every Move You Make: The Studio Recordings (2018)

Professional ratings
Review scores
Source	Rating
AllMusic	4/5 stars
Rolling Stone	3/5 stars

Certifiable: Live in Buenos Aires is a live album and concert video album by the Police. It was recorded in December 2007 during the band's reunion tour and was released in November 2008. The album was released in the United States exclusively through Best Buy. The album has a number of releases including a four disc version containing two CDs and two DVDs. The two CDs contain the live album from River Plate Stadium in Buenos Aires, Argentina. The first DVD contains the 109-minute wide-screen concert presented in Dolby Surround and Stereo. The concert film was directed and produced by Jim Gable and Ann Kim, of Graying & Balding, Inc. The second DVD contains the 50-minute bonus feature, "Better Than Therapy," directed by Stewart Copeland's son Jordan Copeland, detailing The Police's reunion with behind-the-scenes interviews from the band and road crew, plus two photo galleries of The Police on tour: one shot by guitarist and photographer Andy Summers, and one by photographer Danny Clinch. The DVDs were also released on Blu-ray format. A triple vinyl format was also released that contained a digital download of the concert.

== Track listing US (UK deluxe) format ==
All tracks written by Sting, except for "Reggatta de Blanc" by Stewart Copeland/Andy Summers/Sting.

=== CD 1 ===
1. "Message in a Bottle"
2. "Synchronicity II"
3. "Walking on the Moon"
4. "Voices Inside My Head" / "When the World Is Running Down, You Make the Best of What's Still Around"
5. "Don't Stand So Close to Me"
6. "Driven to Tears"
7. "Hole in My Life"
8. "Truth Hits Everybody"
9. "Every Little Thing She Does Is Magic"
10. "Wrapped Around Your Finger"

=== CD 2 ===
1. "De Do Do Do, De Da Da Da"
2. "Invisible Sun"
3. "Walking in Your Footsteps"
4. "Can't Stand Losing You" / "Reggatta de Blanc"
5. "Roxanne"
6. "King of Pain"
7. "So Lonely"
8. "Every Breath You Take"
9. "Next to You"

=== DVD 1 ===
Live from Buenos Aires (same track listing as both CDs)

=== DVD 2 ===
- Better Than Therapy – 50 min. documentary
- Two photo galleries, one by Andy Summers and one by Danny Clinch

== Blu-ray edition ==
=== Blu-ray Disc ===
Same as both DVDs

=== CDs ===
Same as above

== UK (International) standard format ==
=== DVD ===
Live from Buenos Aires (same as deluxe edition)

=== CD ===
1. "Message in a Bottle"
2. "Synchronicity II"
3. "Walking on the Moon"
4. "Don't Stand So Close To Me"
5. "Driven to Tears"
6. "Every Little Thing She Does Is Magic"
7. "De Do Do Do, De Da Da Da"
8. "Walking in Your Footsteps"
9. "Can't Stand Losing You"/"Reggatta de Blanc"
10. "Roxanne"
11. "King of Pain"
12. "So Lonely"
13. "Every Breath You Take"
14. "Next to You"

== Personnel ==
The Police

- Sting – bass guitar, lead vocals
- Andy Summers – guitars, guitars synthesizers, keyboards, backing vocals
- Stewart Copeland – drums, percussion, xylophone, backing vocals

== Charts ==
Chart (2008)	Peak position
Australian Music DVDs Chart	31
Belgian (Flanders) Music DVDs Chart	3
Belgian (Wallonia) Music DVDs Chart	2
Dutch Albums Chart	43
German Albums Chart	25
Swiss Music DVDs Chart	2
Spanish Music DVDs Chart	4

Chart (2009)	Peak position
Italian Music DVDs Chart	1

== Certifications ==
Region	Certification	Certified units/sales
Brazil (Pro-Música Brasil)	Gold	15,000^{*}
France (SNEP)	Platinum	20,000^{*}
Germany (BVMI)	Gold	25,000^{^}
United States (RIAA)	Platinum	100,000^{^}
^{*} Sales figures based on certification alone.^{^} Shipments figures based on certification alone.
