= Greatest Hits (The Police album) =

Greatest hits album by the Police
- Released: 28 September 1992
- Recorded: 1978–1983
- Genres: Rock, new wave, reggae rock
- Length: 67:49
- Label: A&M

The Police chronology
Their Greatest Hits (1990)	Greatest Hits (1992)	Message in a Box: The Complete Recordings (1993)

Professional ratings
Review scores
Source	Rating
Select	3/5 stars

Greatest Hits is the second greatest hits album by the Police, released in September 1992 by A&M Records. It is the band's second compilation album following Every Breath You Take: The Singles. In contrast with its predecessor, it features all 14 original UK top 20 chart singles and five UK number-ones released by the band from 1978 to 1984, including the two missing singles from the previous 1986 compilation, "Synchronicity II" and the original version of "Don't Stand So Close to Me" which had been replaced with the 1986 re-recording. The album also includes two bonus album tracks, "The Bed's Too Big Without You" and "Tea in the Sahara". The cover photograph is by Duane Michals and it was taken at the time of the Synchronicity album. The inner sleeve features a collage of pictures of the band shot by different photographers during their career, including Miles Copeland, Peter Baylis, Adrian Boot, Akihiro Takayama, Anton Corbijn, Danny Quatrochi, Gabor Scott, Janette Beckman, Kim Turner, Michael Ross, Watal Asanuma and Andy Summers.

The album failed to chart in the US, but spent 36 weeks on the UK Albums Chart, where it peaked at number ten. It also peaked at number one on Official New Zealand Music Chart and at number four in Norway.

In 2022, Greatest Hits was reissued for its 30th anniversary in a remastered double-LP vinyl version, resulting in its re-entry on several charts worldwide.

== Critical reception ==
The album came out shortly after Sting's solo album The Soul Cages, prompting David Sinclair to point out in his review in Q magazine that "Copeland and Summers were far more than a passive vehicle for Sting's songs. As powerful personalities and assertive musicians in their own right, they gingered up Sting's basic ideas while putting the brakes on his tendency to earnest excess."

== Track listing ==
All tracks are written by Sting.

No.	Title	Original album	Length
1.	"Roxanne"	Outlandos d'Amour (1978)	3:13
2.	"Can't Stand Losing You"	Outlandos d'Amour	2:48
3.	"So Lonely"	Outlandos d'Amour	4:48
4.	"Message in a Bottle"	Reggatta de Blanc (1979)	4:49
5.	"Walking on the Moon"	Reggatta de Blanc	5:02
6.	"The Bed's Too Big Without You"	Reggatta de Blanc	4:24
7.	"Don't Stand So Close to Me"	Zenyatta Mondatta (1980)	4:02
8.	"De Do Do Do, De Da Da Da"	Zenyatta Mondatta	4:08
9.	"Every Little Thing She Does Is Magic"	Ghost in the Machine (1981)	4:20
10.	"Invisible Sun"	Ghost in the Machine	3:43
11.	"Spirits in the Material World"	Ghost in the Machine	2:58
12.	"Synchronicity II"	Synchronicity (1983)	5:00
13.	"Every Breath You Take"	Synchronicity	4:12
14.	"King of Pain"	Synchronicity	4:57
15.	"Wrapped Around Your Finger"	Synchronicity	5:14
16.	"Tea in the Sahara"	Synchronicity	4:11
Total length:			67:49

== Personnel ==
The Police

- Sting – lead and backing vocals, bass, keyboards, harmonica on "So Lonely", saxophone on "Spirits in the Material World", oboe on "Tea in the Sahara"
- Andy Summers – electric guitar, keyboards, backing vocals
- Stewart Copeland – drums, miscellaneous percussion, keyboards, backing vocals

Additional personnel

- Jean Roussel – piano on "Every Little Thing She Does Is Magic"

== Charts ==
1993–1994 chart performance for Greatest Hits
Chart (1993–1994)	Peak position
Australian Albums (ARIA)	16
Belgian Albums (Ultratop Flanders)	99
Belgian Albums (Ultratop Wallonia)	148
Canada Top Albums/CDs (RPM)	24
French Albums (SNEP)	70
German Albums (Offizielle Top 100)	18
New Zealand Albums (RMNZ)	1
Norwegian Albums (VG-lista)	4
Portuguese Albums (AFP)	38
UK Albums (Official Charts)	10

2022 chart performance for Greatest Hits
Chart (2022)	Peak position
Austrian Albums (Ö3 Austria)	66
German Albums (Offizielle Top 100)	5
Irish Albums (IRMA)	52
Swiss Albums (Schweizer Hitparade)	23
US Billboard 200	141

2025 chart performance for Greatest Hits
Chart (2025)	Peak position
Greek Albums (IFPI)	71

== Certifications ==
Certifications for Greatest Hits
Region	Certification	Certified units/sales
Argentina (CAPIF)	2× Platinum	120,000^{^}
Australia (ARIA)	5× Platinum	350,000^{^}
Belgium (BRMA)	Platinum	50,000^{*}
Canada (Music Canada)	Platinum	100,000^{^}
France (SNEP)	Platinum	300,000^{*}
Mexico (AMPROFON)	Gold	100,000^{^}
New Zealand (RMNZ)	Platinum	15,000^{^}
New Zealand (RMNZ) reissue	Gold	7,500^{‡}
Switzerland (IFPI Switzerland)	Gold	25,000^{^}
United Kingdom (BPI)	3× Platinum	900,000^{‡}
^{*} Sales figures based on certification alone.^{^} Shipments figures based on certification alone.^{‡} Sales+streaming figures based on certification alone.
