= Derek Burbidge =

British film/video maker of the 1970s to 1980s

Derek Burbidge (born 10 March 1947) is one of the most prolific British film and video directors of the 1970s and 1980s.

== Early life ==
Burbidge was born on 10 March 1947, in Weymouth, Dorset.

In 1963, he took a diploma course in photography at Bournemouth College of Art, where he met and married sculpture student Kate Humphreys in 1966.

== Career ==
Burbidge rose to prominence in the early 1970s with the hugely successful companies One West Ltd and Zoetrope Ltd which he set up with Kate in Charlotte Mews, London. He is noted for his innovative work, becoming one of the decade's most sought-after directors. His work includes numerous films, videos, concerts and documentaries as director and producer.

=== Music films ===
In 1971, Burbidge started directing and producing live concert clips that were transmitted on the The Old Grey Whistle Test. These included the Steve Miller Band, Rod Stewart and the Faces, Focus at the Rainbow Theatre, Rory Gallagher Live at The Marquee, and, in the summer of 1976, the Macon Whoopee, a Whistle Test special on Capricorn Records featuring their artists, including a Bob Harris interview with soon-to-be U.S. President Jimmy Carter.

Moving office to Percy Street, London, Burbidge built a sound-recording studio where he recorded many radio commercials as well as voice-overs for television advertisements.

He is widely recognised for his extensive directorial work with the rock band The Police, especially their videos for "Around the World", "Roxanne", "Can't Stand Losing You", "Message In A Bottle", "Walking on the Moon", "Don't Stand So Close to Me", "De Do Do Do, De Da Da Da", "Invisible Sun", and "So Lonely". This formed the basis of the 1982 BBC-transmitted Police in the East, with Annie Nightingale.

Other productions included Queen's "We Are the Champions". The Go-Go's' "Our Lips Are Sealed", AC/DC's "For Those About to Rock (We Salute You)", The Honeydrippers' "Sea of Love 85", and Robert Plant's "Pink and Black" and "Little by Little".

=== Video director ===
Burbidge's first shoot using video cameras was for Warner Brothers, to promote the release of Gary Numan's "Cars" at Molinaire Studios, London. Numan and director Burbidge appeared on Magpie on 23 October 1979, interviewed by Mick Robertson, to discuss the song's innovative music video, using the then new technique of squeeze zoom. The interview also showed a clip from the innovative Godley & Creme video for ""An Englishman in New York", which Burbidge shot at Molinaire Studios in London.

Burbidge filmed many live concerts at the Rainbow Theatre in London, including, on 24 July 1973, the first music stereo simulcast, broadcast on BBC Television, with the stereo soundtrack transmitted on the radio, of Van Morrison Live at the Rainbow Theatre, featuring Morrison and The Caledonia Soul Orchestra. (Although filmed on 16mm film, the soundtrack was mixed at Advision Studios London, on 35mm film for transmission as stereo.) It was broadcast on 27 May 1974.

Other concerts videoed by Burbidge using Molinaire Studio's outside broadcast unit and his own digital recording mobile 'Module One' were Gary Numan's 1979 The Touring Principle, Eurythmics' Sweet Dreams, and Chris de Burgh's Live in concert in Munich.

From offices and cutting rooms at his home in Clapham London, he directed many of the overseas acts transmitted on the BBC's The Old Grey Whistle Test. He travelled the world with the band Foreigner in the 1970s and The Police in the 1980s.

=== Feature films and TV programmes ===
In 1980, Burbidge invited Jools Holland to link the film of The Police in Montserrat. It was Holland's first experience of presenting, and launched him into a new career. He went on to present The Tube with Paula Yates.

In 1981, Burbidge's company Zoetrope Ltd made the cult feature film Urgh! A Music War, directed by Burbidge, and produced by Michael White for Lorimar Productions with Miles Copeland.

In the summer of 1982, Burbidge spent time in New York making a film which was part documentary, part autobiography, to accompany the Steven Van Zandt album Men Without Women. This premiered at the Cannes Film Festival at the end of the European tour of Little Steven and the Disciples of Soul. The film went to a short run at the Fox Theatre in Venice, California.

1982 to 1983 for channel 4 Swank, a six-part TV series on fashion with Dawn French commissioned by TV Channel 4 commissioning editor John Cummings.

In 1984, Burbidge moved to South Eggardon Farm in Dorset.

From in 1985 to 1986, he made another six-part TV Series for Channel 4 with Dawn French on food, called Scoff, for his production company Zoetrope Ltd.

Many original film negatives and video tapes of the above works directed and produced by Burbidge for his companies One West and Zoetrope are held at the British Film Institute.

For the next ten years, farming became Burbidge's consuming interest until 1994. He returned to Dorset in 2022.

=== Music concerts ===
- 1972: Rory Gallagher - Live at the Marquee Club
- 1973: Van Morrison - Live at the Rainbow Theatre
- 1975: Billy Cobham - Billy Cobham at the Rainbow Theatre
- 1975: Bruce Springsteen and the E Street Band - at the Hammersmith Odeon
- 1979: Supertramp - Supertramp Live in Paris
- 1979: Elkie Brooks - Live at Hammersmith Odeon
- 1979: Gary Numan - The Touring Principal 79
- 1981: The Police - Montserrat 81
- 1981: The Police - Police in the East
- 1981: The Police - Around the World
- 1981: April Wine - Live in London
- 1982: Little River Band - Live Exposure
- 1982: I.R.S. Records - Show with Jools Holland
- 1982: John Otway - John Otway at the Tricycle Theatre
- 1983: Christine McVie - Los Angeles Country Club
- 1983: Eurythmics - Live From Heaven
- 1983: Thompson Twins - Side Kicks the Movie Live in Liverpool
- 1984: W.A.S.P - Live at the Lyceum London
- 1984: Chris de Burgh - The Munich Concerts
- 1984: Gary Numan - The Berserker Tour
- 1987: Tammy Wynette - Tammy Wynette in Concert from the Capitol Music Hall

=== Television ===
- 1982: Swank with Dawn French, 6 episodes
- 1985: Scoff with Dawn French, 6 episodes

=== Music videography ===
- 1977: Queen - "We Are the Champions"
- 1978: The Police - ""Roxanne"
- 1978: The Police - "Can't Stand Losing You"
- 1978: The Police - "So Lonely"
- 1978: The Undertones - "Teenage Kicks"
- 1979: The Police - "Walking on the Moon"
- 1979: The Police - "Message in a Bottle"
- 1979: AC/DC - "Highway to Hell"
- 1979: AC/DC - "If you want Blood you Got it"
- 1979: Gary Numan - "We Are Glass"
- 1979: Gary Numan - "Cars"
- 1979: Gary Numan - "Down in the Park"
- 1979: Godley and Cream - "An Englishman in New York"
- 1980: Squeeze - "Another Nail in My Heart"
- 1980: The Police - "De Do Do Do De Da Da Da"
- 1980: The Police - "Don't Stand So Close to Me"
- 1980: The Cramps - "Garbage Man"
- 1980: Stray Cats "Runaway Boys"
- 1981: Billy Squier - "My Kinda Lover"
- 1981: The Police - "One World"
- 1981: The Go-Go's - "Our Lips Are Sealed"
- 1981: AC/DC - "Back in Black"
- 1981: AC/DC - "Let's Get It Up"
- 1981: AC/DC - "Put the Finger on You"
- 1981: The Police - "Invisible Sun"
- 1981: The Police - "Every Little Thing She Does Is Magic"
- 1981: The Police - "Spirits in the Material World"
- 1981: The Police - "Demolition Man"
- 1981: The Pretenders - "I Go to Sleep"
- 1982: AC/DC - "For Those About to Rock (We Salute You)"
- 1984: Robert Plant - "Sea of Love"
- 1985: Gino Vannelli - "Hurts to Be in Love"
- 1985: Gino Vannelli - "Black Cars"
- 1985: Robert Plant - "Little by Little"
- 1985: Robert Plant - "Pink and Black"
- 1985: The Honeydrippers - "Rockin at Midnight"
- 1986: Elvis Costello - "Don't Let Me Be Misunderstood"

=== Feature films ===
- 1981: Urgh! A Music War - Urgh! A Music War
- 1982: Little Steven and the Disciples of Soul - Men Without Women
