= Every Breath You Take: The Singles =

Greatest hits album by The Police
- Released: 31 October 1986 (UK); 3 November 1986 (US)
- Recorded: 1978–1986
- Genres: New wave; post-punk; reggae rock
- Length: 50:26 (The Singles); 59:20 (The Classics)
- Label: A&M
- Producers: The Police; Hugh Padgham; Nigel Gray; Laurie Latham

The Police chronology
Synchronicity (1983)	Every Breath You Take: The Singles (1986)	Greatest Hits (1992)

Alternative covers
- Every Breath You Take: The Classics (1995)

Alternative cover
- Their Greatest Hits (1990)

Singles from Every Breath You Take: The Singles
- 1. "Don't Stand So Close to Me '86" Released: 3 October 1986; 2. "Roxanne" Released: 28 November 1986

Professional ratings
Review scores
Source	Rating
AllMusic	4.5/5 stars
AllMusic	4.5/5 stars
Robert Christgau	A−
Rolling Stone	4/5 stars
Encyclopedia of Popular Music	5/5 stars
Tom Hull	A

Every Breath You Take: The Singles is the first compilation album by the Police, released on 31 October 1986 by A&M Records. In 1990, the album was repackaged and released on 12 October 1990 in Germany, Italy, Netherlands New Zealand, Australia and Spain as Their Greatest Hits with a different cover.

A video collection entitled Every Breath You Take: The Videos was released alongside the album. It was released on VHS and Betamax cassette, as well as on LaserDisc in the UK, Europe and in Japan. The collection featured 14 promotional videos, for 12 of the 13 tracks on the album as well as "Synchronicity II" and the original version of "Don't Stand So Close to Me". However, it did not include "King of Pain". This compilation also does not include songs from other original singles band: "Fall Out", "Bring on the Night", "The Bed's Too Big Without You" & "Secret Journey".

== Background ==
After the conclusion of the Synchronicity Tour, The Police announced they were taking a pause of reflection before recording. In 1984, Andy Summers released a second album of instrumental music with Robert Fripp, Bewitched. Stewart Copeland worked on the soundtrack of the Francis Ford Coppola film Rumble Fish, whose single "Don't Box Me In" peaked at No. 91 in the UK singles chart. In 1985 Sting released his first solo album, The Dream of the Blue Turtles, to great critical and commercial success. The subsequent tour yielded a double live album, Bring on the Night. In 1985 Copeland started working on The Rhythmatist, an ambitious project that led him to spend significant time recording and filming in Congo. About one year later, Summers scored the soundtrack for the film Down and Out in Beverly Hills.

By the time the trio reconvened to play three concerts for the Amnesty International A Conspiracy of Hope Tour in June 1986, the atmosphere was tense. "It was a very symbolic moment," said Sting. "We'd broken up, then sort of reformed to do the Amnesty Tour. U2 were there as well and as we closed our set with "Invisible Sun", Bono came out and sang it with us. And then we symbolically handed our instruments over to U2, because they were about to become what we were — the biggest band in the world."

In July, the band booked time in the studio to record a new album. In the liner notes to their box set Message in a Box: The Complete Recordings (1993), Summers recalled: "The attempt to record a new album was doomed from the outset. The night before we went into the studio, Stewart broke his collarbone falling off a horse and that meant we lost our last chance of recovering some rapport just by jamming together. Anyway, it was clear Sting had no real intention of writing any new songs for the Police. It was an empty exercise." With Copeland unable to play the drums, the short-lived reunion resulted in an attempt to re-record previous hits. Copeland opted to use his Fairlight CMI to program the drum tracks but Sting pushed to use the drums on his Synclavier instead. As the group's engineer found the Synclavier's programming interface difficult, it ended up taking him two days to complete the task. Copeland ultimately finished the drum programming and claimed that the Fairlight's "Page R" (the device's sequencing page) saved his life and put him on the map as a composer. In a Qantas inflight radio program Reeling in the Years, Copeland was quoted as saying that the argument over Synclavier versus Fairlight drums was "the straw that broke the camel's back," which led to the group's unravelling.

"Don't Stand So Close to Me '86" was released in October 1986 as the final single from The Police. "De Do Do Do De Da Da Da" was also recorded but the band was dissatisfied with the result; it was shelved until its inclusion on the DTS-CD release of the Every Breath You Take: The Classics album in 1995.

As if to signify the poor atmosphere pervading the session, the three band members did not appear together in the photograph on the album cover, nor in the video shot by Godley & Creme to promote "Don't Stand So Close to Me '86". Following the release of the album, The Police effectively disbanded.

== Reception ==
Every Breath You Take: The Singles reached No. 1 in the UK album chart and No. 7 in the US. "Don't Stand So Close to Me '86" made it into the UK Top 25.

== Track listing ==
All tracks are written by Sting.

Side one
No.	Title	Original album	Length
1.	"Roxanne"	Outlandos d'Amour	3:11
2.	"Can't Stand Losing You"	Outlandos d'Amour	2:47
3.	"Message in a Bottle"	Reggatta de Blanc	4:50
4.	"Walking on the Moon"	Reggatta de Blanc	5:01
5.	"Don't Stand So Close to Me '86"	re-recording of song from Zenyatta Mondatta	4:52
6.	"De Do Do Do, De Da Da Da"	Zenyatta Mondatta	4:06

Side two
No.	Title	Original album	Length
7.	"Every Little Thing She Does Is Magic"	Ghost in the Machine	4:19
8.	"Invisible Sun"	Ghost in the Machine	3:44
9.	"Spirits in the Material World"	Ghost in the Machine	2:58
10.	"Every Breath You Take"	Synchronicity	4:13
11.	"King of Pain"	Synchronicity	4:57
12.	"Wrapped Around Your Finger"	Synchronicity	5:14

=== Cassette/CD version in UK/Europe only ===
All tracks are written by Sting.

No.	Title	Original album	Length
1.	"Roxanne"	Outlandos d'Amour	3:11
2.	"Can't Stand Losing You"	Outlandos d'Amour	2:47
3.	"So Lonely"	Outlandos d'Amour	4:48
4.	"Message in a Bottle"	Reggatta de Blanc	4:50
5.	"Walking on the Moon"	Reggatta de Blanc	5:01
6.	"Don't Stand So Close to Me '86"	re-recording of song from Zenyatta Mondatta	4:52
7.	"De Do Do Do, De Da Da Da"	Zenyatta Mondatta	4:06
8.	"Every Little Thing She Does Is Magic"	Ghost in the Machine	4:19
9.	"Invisible Sun"	Ghost in the Machine	3:44
10.	"Spirits in the Material World"	Ghost in the Machine	2:58
11.	"Every Breath You Take"	Synchronicity	4:13
12.	"King of Pain"	Synchronicity	4:57
13.	"Wrapped Around Your Finger"	Synchronicity	5:14

== Personnel ==
- Sting – lead and backing vocals, bass, keyboards, saxophone on "Spirits in the Material World"
- Andy Summers – electric guitar, keyboards
- Stewart Copeland – drums, percussion, keyboards, drum programming on "Don't Stand So Close to Me '86"
- Jean Roussel – piano on "Every Little Thing She Does Is Magic"

== Every Breath You Take: The Classics ==
In 1995, A&M released Every Breath You Take: The Classics (reissued in some European countries as The Police Greatest Hits (digitally remastered) in 1996) to replace the original album. It features a slightly different track listing: the original version of "Don't Stand So Close to Me" replaces the 1986 recording at track 5; the '86 version appears at track 13. A "New Classic Rock Mix" of "Message in a Bottle" is included as track 14. The album was reissued on the DTS format in 2000 and on hybrid CD/SACD in 2003, with both of these versions including a previously unreleased version of "De Do Do Do, De Da Da Da" and the DTS version lacking "So Lonely." At the same time as the 2003 CD/SACD release, the Every Breath You Take: The Videos video collection was released on DVD as Every Breath You Take: The DVD.

In the DTS version, "Every Little Thing She Does Is Magic" features a different intro. Also, The Singles featured a shortened version of "Can't Stand Losing You" which features an early fade out which ends the song before the final chorus concludes. The Classics replaces this with the full-length version.

=== Track listing ===
All tracks are written by Sting.

No.	Title	Original album	Length
1.	"Roxanne"	Outlandos d'Amour	3:11
2.	"Can't Stand Losing You"	Outlandos d'Amour	2:58
3.	"Message in a Bottle"	Reggatta de Blanc	4:50
4.	"Walking on the Moon"	Reggatta de Blanc	5:01
5.	"Don't Stand So Close to Me"	Zenyatta Mondatta	4:04
6.	"De Do Do Do, De Da Da Da"	Zenyatta Mondatta	4:06
7.	"Every Little Thing She Does Is Magic"	Ghost in the Machine	4:19
8.	"Invisible Sun"	Ghost in the Machine	3:44
9.	"Spirits in the Material World"	Ghost in the Machine	2:58
10.	"Every Breath You Take"	Synchronicity	4:13
11.	"King of Pain"	Synchronicity	4:57
12.	"Wrapped Around Your Finger"	Synchronicity	5:14
13.	"Don't Stand So Close to Me '86"	rerecording of song from Zenyatta Mondatta	4:51
14.	"Message in a Bottle" (New Classic Rock mix)	remix of song from Reggatta de Blanc	4:51

DTS/SACD edition alternative track
No.	Title	Original album	Length
6.	"De Do Do Do, De Da Da Da '86"	rerecording of song from Zenyatta Mondatta	4:25

== Charts ==
=== Weekly charts ===
Weekly chart performance for Every Breath You Take: The Singles
Chart (1986–1987)	Peak position
Australia Albums (Kent Music Report)	4
Austrian Albums (Ö3 Austria)	20
Canada Top Albums/CDs (RPM)	11
Dutch Albums (Album Top 100)	11
German Albums (Offizielle Top 100)	18
Italian Albums (Musica e dischi)	23
New Zealand Albums (RMNZ)	1
Swiss Albums (Schweizer Hitparade)	21
UK Albums (Official Charts)	1
US Billboard 200	7

=== Year-end charts ===
Chart (1987)	Position
New Zealand Albums (RMNZ)	26
US Billboard 200	86

== Certifications and sales ==
Region	Certification	Certified units/sales
Australia	—	150,000
Brazil	—	200,000
Canada (Music Canada)	Platinum	100,000^{^}
France (SNEP)	2× Platinum	600,000^{*}
New Zealand (RMNZ)	Platinum	15,000^{^}
Spain (Promusicae)	Gold	50,000^{^}
United Kingdom (BPI)	4× Platinum	1,200,000^{^}
United States (RIAA) video	Gold	50,000^{^}
United States (RIAA)	5× Platinum	5,000,000^{^}
^{*} Sales figures based on certification alone.^{^} Shipments figures based on certification alone.

Certifications for Their Greatest Hits
Region	Certification	Certified units/sales
Germany (BVMI)	Gold	250,000^{^}
Netherlands (NVPI)	Gold	50,000^{^}
^{^} Shipments figures based on certification alone.
