= Secret Journey =

Secret Journey may refer to:

- "Secret Journey" (song), a 1981 song by The Police.
- Secret Journey (1939 film)
- Secret Journey (2006 film)
