= Brimstone & Treacle (soundtrack) =

Soundtrack album by Various artists
- Released: October 1982
- Genres: New wave, rock
- Length: 36:50
- Label: A&M

Brimstone & Treacle is the soundtrack for the 1982 film adaptation of the play Brimstone and Treacle directed by Richard Loncraine and starring Denholm Elliott, Joan Plowright and Sting. Sting and the Police wrote most of the original material on the album. The rest of the soundtrack was made of songs by other acts signed to A&M like The Go-Go's and Squeeze and a couple of traditional songs performed by the Finchley Children's Music Group and the ad-hoc formed Brimstone Chorale.

The Police's "I Burn for You" is a song Sting originally wrote for the band Last Exit in the mid-1970s; he later offered it to the Police for Zenyatta Mondatta in 1980, but it was deemed "too sentimental" for their musical direction. Sting gave the song to the British dance troupe Hot Gossip who recorded their own version in 1981. The band eventually chose to record "I Burn for You" for their fourth album Ghost In The Machine the following year, but it did not make the cut. Stewart Copeland's roadie Jeff Seitz played drums on Sting's "Only You" while the voice of actress Suzanna Hamilton can be heard on the Police's "A Kind of Loving". Words from the original play by Dennis Potter form the lyrics of "Narration".

Sting's cover of "Spread a Little Happiness" was released as a single and it reached number 16 in the UK charts. The title track was also awarded the 1984 Grammy Award for Best Rock Instrumental Performance, making Sting a three-time winner in this particular category, the Police being recipients of the award in 1981 and 1982—although Sting had no part in the band's "Behind My Camel", the 1982 award winner which he did not write and on which he refused to play. Sting would later go on to perform "I Burn for You" live during his The Dream of the Blue Turtles tour in 1985. That version is featured on his Bring on the Night live album.

== Track listing ==
No.	Title	Writer(s)	Performing artist	Length
1.	"When the Roll Is Called Up Yonder"	James Milton Black	Finchley Children's Music Group	2:07
2.	"Brimstone & Treacle"	Sting	Sting	2:15
3.	"Narration"	Sting, Dennis Potter	Sting	4:02
4.	"How Stupid Mr. Bates"	Stewart Copeland, Sting, Andy Summers	The Police	2:41
5.	"Only You"	Sting, Potter	Sting	2:37
6.	"I Burn for You"	Sting	The Police	4:50
7.	"Spread a Little Happiness"	Vivian Ellis	Sting	3:25
8.	"We Got the Beat"	Charlotte Caffey	The Go-Go's	2:30
9.	"You Know I Had the Strangest Dream"	Sting	Sting	2:22
10.	"Up the Junction"	Chris Difford, Glenn Tilbrook	Squeeze	3:09
11.	"Bless This House"	May Brahe, Helen Taylor	The Brimstone Chorale	0:41
12.	"A Kind of Loving"	Copeland, Sting, Summers	The Police	2:04
13.	"Brimstone 2"	Sting	Sting	4:07

== Personnel ==
- Brimstone Chorale – Performer
- The Go-Go's – Performer
- The Police – Performer
- Jeff Seitz – Drums on "Only You".
- Squeeze – Performer
- Sting – Performer
- Kenith Trodd – Producer
