= List of European number-one hits of 1981 =

This is a list of the Europarade number-one singles of 1981.

Date	Song	Artist
1 January	"Super Trouper"	ABBA
8 January	"Super Trouper"	ABBA
15 January	"Super Trouper"	ABBA
22 January	"Super Trouper"	ABBA
29 January	"Super Trouper"	ABBA
5 February	"Super Trouper"	ABBA
12 February	"(Just Like) Starting Over"	John Lennon
19 February	"(Just Like) Starting Over"	John Lennon
26 February	"(Just Like) Starting Over"	John Lennon
5 March	"(Just Like) Starting Over"	John Lennon
12 March	"Woman In Love"	Barbra Streisand
19 March	"Woman In Love"	Barbra Streisand
26 March	"Shaddap You Face"	Joe Dolce Music Theatre
2 April	"Shaddap You Face"	Joe Dolce Music Theatre
9 April	"Shaddap You Face"	Joe Dolce Music Theatre
16 April	"Shaddap You Face"	Joe Dolce Music Theatre
23 April	"Shaddap You Face"	Joe Dolce Music Theatre
30 April	"Shaddap You Face"	Joe Dolce Music Theatre
7 May	"Making Your Mind Up"	Bucks Fizz
14 May	"Making Your Mind Up"	Bucks Fizz
21 May	"Making Your Mind Up"	Bucks Fizz
28 May	"Making Your Mind Up"	Bucks Fizz
4 June	"Stand and Deliver"	Adam & The Ants
11 June	"Stand and Deliver"	Adam & The Ants
18 June	"Stars on 45"	Stars on 45
25 June	"Stars on 45"	Stars on 45
2 July	"Bette Davis Eyes"	Kim Carnes
9 July	"Bette Davis Eyes"	Kim Carnes
16 July	"Bette Davis Eyes"	Kim Carnes
23 July	"Bette Davis Eyes"	Kim Carnes
30 July	"Chequered Love"	Kim Wilde
9 August	"Bette Davis Eyes"	Kim Carnes
16 August	"Stars on 45 Vol. 2"	Stars on 45
23 August	"Stars on 45 Vol. 2"	Stars on 45
30 August	"Stars on 45 Vol. 2"	Stars on 45
6 September	"Stars on 45 Vol. 2"	Stars on 45
13 September	"Hold On Tight"	Electric Light Orchestra
20 September	"Hold On Tight"	Electric Light Orchestra
27 September	"Hold On Tight"	Electric Light Orchestra
4 October	"Hold On Tight"	Electric Light Orchestra
11 October	"Hold On Tight"	Electric Light Orchestra
18 October	"Green Door"	Shakin' Stevens
25 October	"For Your Eyes Only"	Sheena Easton
1 November	"Tainted Love"	Soft Cell
8 November	"Tainted Love"	Soft Cell
15 November	"Japanese Boy"	Aneka
22 November	"Every Little Thing She Does Is Magic"	The Police
29 November	"Every Little Thing She Does Is Magic"	The Police
6 December	"Every Little Thing She Does Is Magic"	The Police
13 December	"Physical"	Olivia Newton-John
20 December	"Physical"	Olivia Newton-John
27 December	"Under Pressure"	Queen & David Bowie
