= Bring On the Night =

Live album by Sting
- Released: 20 June 1986
- Recorded: 29 May 1985; 4 December 1985; 21 December 1985; 23 December 1985
- Venues: Théâtre Mogador (Paris); Palazzo dello Sport (Rome); Rijnhal (Arnhem); Palais Omnisports de Paris-Bercy (Paris)
- Genres: Jazz; new wave
- Length: 83:04
- Label: A&M
- Producers: Sting; Kim Turner

Sting chronology
The Dream of the Blue Turtles (1985)	Bring On the Night (1986)	...Nothing Like the Sun (1987)

Professional ratings
Review scores
Source	Rating
AllMusic	3.5/5 stars
Rolling Stone	(favorable)

Bring On the Night is the first live album by the English musician Sting recorded over the course of several live shows in 1985 and released in 1986. The title is taken from a song by the Police from their 1979 album Reggatta de Blanc. The songs performed include Sting's early solo material from the studio album The Dream of the Blue Turtles, and from his time with the Police, with a few of the performances played as medleys of the two. The touring band features the prominent jazz musicians Branford Marsalis on tenor and soprano saxophones, Darryl Jones on bass guitar, Kenny Kirkland on keyboards and synthesizer, and Omar Hakim on drums. Also appearing are backing vocalists Janice Pendarvis and Dolette McDonald.

Despite not featuring any hit singles, the album reached number 16 on the UK Album Charts and won Sting a Grammy Award in 1988 for Best Pop Vocal Performance, Male.

Bring On the Night is also a 1985 documentary directed by Michael Apted covering the formative stages of Sting's solo career—released as DVD in 2005.

== Track listing ==
All tracks are written by Sting, except where noted.

Side one
No.	Title	Recording date & location	Length
1.	"Bring On the Night/When the World Is Running Down, You Make the Best of What's Still Around"	23 December 1985 at the Palais Omnisports de Paris-Bercy, Paris, France	11:41
2.	"Consider Me Gone"	29 May 1985 at Théâtre Mogador, Paris, France	4:53
3.	"Low Life"	4 December 1985 at the Palazzo dello Sport, Rome, Italy	4:03

Side two
No.	Title	Recording date & location	Length
4.	"We Work the Black Seam"	23 December 1985 at the Palais Omnisports de Paris-Bercy, Paris, France	6:55
5.	"Driven to Tears"	23 December 1985 at the Palais Omnisports de Paris-Bercy, Paris, France	6:59
6.	"The Dream of the Blue Turtles/Demolition Man"	23 December 1985 at the Palais Omnisports de Paris-Bercy, Paris, France	6:08

Side three
No.	Title	Recording date & location	Length
7.	"One World (Not Three)/Love Is the Seventh Wave"	23 December 1985 at the Palais Omnisports de Paris-Bercy, Paris, France	11:10
8.	"Moon over Bourbon Street"	21 December 1985 at Rijnhal, Arnhem, the Netherlands	4:19
9.	"I Burn for You"	23 December 1985 at the Palais Omnisports de Paris-Bercy, Paris, France	5:38

Side four
No.	Title	Writer(s)	Recording date & location	Length
10.	"Another Day"		4 December 1985 at the Palazzo dello Sport, Rome, Italy	4:41
11.	"Children's Crusade"		21 December 1985 at Rijnhal, Arnhem, the Netherlands	5:22
12.	"Down So Long"	J. B. Lenoir; Alex Atkins	29 May 1985 at Théâtre Mogador, Paris, France	4:54
13.	"Tea in the Sahara"		21 December 1985 at Rijnhal, Arnhem, the Netherlands	6:25
Total length:				83:04

On CD and digital editions, sides 1 and 2 correspond to disc 1 and sides 3 and 4 to disc 2.

== Personnel ==
=== Musicians ===
- Sting – lead vocals, guitars, synthesizers, double bass (9)
- Darryl Jones – bass
- Kenny Kirkland – keyboards, synthesizers
- Branford Marsalis – saxophones, rap, percussion
- Omar Hakim – drums, electronic percussion
- Janice Pendarvis – backing vocals
- Dolette McDonald – backing vocals

=== Technical ===
- Produced Sting and Kim Turner
- Engineered by Gerd Rautenbach, Peter Brandt, Kim Turner, and Jim Scott
- Recorded by Pete Smith at Dierks Mobile 2 (1, 4, 5, 6, 7, 9)
- Technicians – Danny Quatrochi (guitar), Tam Fairgreave (bass and keyboards), Billy Thompson (drums)
- Management – Kim Turner and Miles Copeland
- Road manager – Billy Francis
- Production manager – Keith Bradley
- Art direction – Michael Ross
- Design – John Warwicker and Michael Ross
- Painting – Su Huntley and Donna Muir
- Photography – Denis O'Regan, Donna Muir, Michael Ross and Su Huntley
- Monitor mixer – Tom Herrman
- Sound – Tony Blanc, John Roden and Martin Rowe.
- Lighting – Jim Laroche and Bill Neil
- Rigger – Deryck Dickinson
- Booking – Ian Copeland, Teresa Green and Buck Williams at Frontier Booking International

== Charts ==
=== Weekly charts ===
Weekly chart performance for Bring On the Night
Chart (1986)	Peak position
Austrian Albums (Ö3 Austria)	9
Dutch Albums (Album Top 100)	2
German Albums (Offizielle Top 100)	10
New Zealand Albums (RMNZ)	19
Norwegian Albums (VG-lista)	19
Swedish Albums (Sverigetopplistan)	28
Swiss Albums (Schweizer Hitparade)	11
UK Albums (Official Charts)	16

=== Year-end charts ===
Year-end chart performance for Bring On the Night
Chart (1986)	Position
Dutch Albums (Album Top 100)	49
German Albums (Offizielle Top 100)	61

== Certifications ==
Region	Certification	Certified units/sales
Brazil	—	125,000
United Kingdom (BPI)	Silver	60,000^{^}
^{^} Shipments figures based on certification alone.
