= Can't Stand Losing You: Surviving the Police =

2012 American documentary film directed by R. J. Cutler

- Poster
- Directed by: Andy Grieve
- Based on: One Train Later: A Memoir by Andy Summers
- Produced by: Nicolas Cage; Norman Golightly; William J. Immerman; Andy Summers; Bob Yari
- Starring: Stewart Copeland; Sting; Andy Summers
- Cinematography: Tom Hurwitz
- Edited by: Andy Grieve
- Music by: The Police
- Production companies: Bob Yari Productions; Saturn Films; Public Road Productions
- Distributed by: Cinema Libre Studio
- Release date: November 9, 2012
- Running time: 79 minutes
- Country: United States
- Language: English

Can't Stand Losing You: Surviving the Police is a 2012 American documentary film directed by Andy Grieve on the subject of the English rock group The Police. The film is loosely based on One Train Later: A Memoir written by guitarist Andy Summers. The title references one of the song titles from the band's debut album, Outlandos d'Amour.

== Synopsis ==
The film focuses on Summers' experiences with the band, starting with his earliest days in the 1960s music scene. Summers was the guitarist for the band The Animals at that time, only briefly encountering Sting and Copeland by chance a few times here and there. Eventually these chance encounters led to the formation of the punk band The Police. Through the use of photography, often candid, and the recounting of his own memoirs, Summers captures the rise to popularity and eventual collapse of the band in the mid-80s. The band then reunites in 2007 for a global reunion tour and Summers captures the memories and perspectives of the other members of the band as well.

== Production ==
In early 2015, after the film had premiered at Doc NYC in 2012 and First Time Fest in 2013, Cinema Libre Studio purchased the film for distribution in the United States. It is director Andy Grieve's debut film and is produced by actor Nicolas Cage and his production company, Saturn Films. Summers provided the original score for the film and executive produced the film as well.

== Release ==
=== Theatrical ===
The film was initially released in 2012 at the Doc NYC film festival, but later received a theatrical run in American cinemas in 2015 ahead of the film's physical release.

=== Home media ===
The film was released on Blu-ray and DVD on July 14, 2015 through Cinema Libre Studios.

== Reception ==
=== Box office ===
The film grossed $23,262 in the United States and Canada.

=== Critical response ===
The film has received generally negative reviews. On review aggregator Rotten Tomatoes, 39% of 18 critics have given the film a positive review, with a 5.1 out of 10 average rating. According to Metacritic, the documentary received "generally unfavorable reviews", based on an average score of 33 out of 100 from eight critic reviews. Many criticisms cite the film's slow pacing, lack of exciting information, and complete focus on guitarist Andy Summers.

Jeannette Catsoulis of The New York Times refers to the film as a "rather dull documentary" and states that the film is "Mr. Summers’s show all the way".
