= When the World Is Running Down, You Make the Best of What's Still Around =

1980 song by the Police

Song by the Police

from the album Zenyatta Mondatta
- Released: 3 October 1980
- Genre: Funk
- Length: 3:38
- Label: A&M
- Songwriter: Sting
- Producers: The Police; Nigel Gray

Audio
- "When the World Is Running Down" on YouTube

"When the World Is Running Down (You Can't Go Wrong)"

Single by Different Gear vs the Police
- Released: 24 July 2000
- Length: 3:24 (radio edit)
- Label: Pagan
- Songwriter: Sting
- Producer: Different Gear

The Police singles chronology
"Roxanne '97" (1997)	"When the World Is Running Down (You Can't Go Wrong)" (2000)

"When the World Is Running Down, You Make the Best of What's Still Around" (or simply titled "When the World Is Running Down") is a song written by Sting that was first released by the English rock band the Police on their 1980 album Zenyatta Mondatta. Along with another song from Zenyatta Mondatta, "Voices Inside My Head", the song reached No. 3 on the US Billboard Disco Top 100 chart in early 1981. In 2000, a remix version credited to Different Gear versus the Police reached No. 28 on the UK Singles Chart, No. 7 on the Billboard Dance Club Play chart and No. 94 in the Netherlands. On radio stations, the song is often played directly after "Driven to Tears".

== Lyrics and music ==
"When the World Is Running Down, You Make the Best of What's Still Around" was one of Sting's earliest attempts at a song whose lyrics deal with concerns of the outside world rather than just his own issues. Ellie O'Day of Vancouver Free Press describes the lyrics as being mostly a "repetitive chant". Ultimate Classic Rock critic Mike Duquette describes the theme as "a man going insane in a post-apocalyptic world." Sting regards the song as having a post-apocalyptic vision, something it shares with an earlier Police song, "Bring on the Night", from the 1979 album Reggatta de Blanc. Sting has said of the two songs "such vanity as to imagine one's self as the sole survivor of a holocaust with all one's favorite things still intact".

"When the World Is Running Down, You Make the Best of What's Still Around" and "Bring on the Night" also share their chord progression. Rolling Stone critic David Fricke notes a structural similarity between "When the World Is Running Down, You Make the Best of What's Still Around" and two songs from Reggatta de Blanc, "Walking on the Moon" and "The Bed's Too Big without You". Like those two Reggatta de Blanc songs, "When the World Is Running Down, You Make the Best of What's Still Around" repeats its three-chord progression over its nearly four-minute length. Fricke regards the chord progression as "hypnotic".

== Personnel ==
The Police

- Sting – bass guitar, lead and backing vocals, synthesizer
- Andy Summers – guitar, backing vocals
- Stewart Copeland – drums, backing vocals

== Critical reception ==
Author Chris Welch praises the rhythm section of Sting and Stewart Copeland on the song, particularly the way they go with the flow and groove with ease. Sounds critic Phil Sutcliffe commented on its "expression of melancholy", noting that it maintains a restrained, dry tone that is able to project sadness without being overly demonstrative. RAM magazine critic Greg Taylor criticises the lyrics for not doing "anything with its potentially political message" but praises the music, particularly Andy Summers' "long ringing" guitar chords. Mojo critic John Harris regards it as one of several formless jams on the album, complaining that it "randomly fades out as if simple boredom finally won out". Duquette called it a "delirious dance drone cut" with an "ass-shaking bassline"

Police guitarist Andy Summers considers "When the World Is Running Down, You Make the Best of What's Still Around" to be one of the promising songs Sting had written in advance of the Zenyatta Mondatta sessions and which form the "meat" of the album, the others being "Driven to Tears" and the hit singles "De Do Do Do, De Da Da Da" and "Don't Stand So Close to Me". Police drummer Stewart Copeland has described the song (not necessarily entirely seriously) as "pre Rossinus Mantuanus (via Carl Orff) with metre altered to fit the characteristic Police beat".

== Remix version ==
In early 2000, a 12-inch bootleg remix version of the song titled "When the World Is Running Down (You Can't Go Wrong)" began circulating in prominent nightclubs, played by such disc jockeys as Pete Tong, David Morales and Terry Farley. At first, it was unknown who was responsible for the remix, but it turned out to be Gino Scaletti and Quinn Whalley, also known as Different Gear. Pagan Records eventually got permission from the Police's label, A&M Records, to release the remix commercially. The remix version was credited to Different Gear versus the Police and reached No. 28 on the UK Singles Chart. On the US Billboard Dance Club Play chart, the remix went to No. 7. This version was included in the soundtrack for the film Red Planet (2000).

== Charts ==
=== Original version ===
Chart (1981)	Peak position
US Dance Club Songs (Billboard) with "Voices Inside My Head"	3

=== Different Gear remix ===
Chart (2000)	Peak position
Europe (Eurochart Hot 100)	93
Ireland Dance (IRMA)	7
Netherlands (Single Top 100)	94
Scottish Singles Sales (Official Charts)	28
UK Singles (Official Charts)	28
UK Dance (Official Charts)	3
UK Indie (Official Charts)	5
US Dance Club Songs (Billboard)	7

== Other appearances ==
Besides the remix version, "When the World Is Running Down, You Make the Best of What's Still Around" has been covered by a number of artists. Sting himself covered it himself on his solo live album Bring on the Night. The Bring on the Night version is a medley with the Police song "Bring on the Night" from the 1979 album Reggatta de Blanc and features contributions from Branford Marsalis and keyboardist Kenny Kirkland. The song was also covered by Tatsuya Nishiwaki on his 2004 album Atmosphere/Sound of Gravity.

The Police version of "When the World Is Running Down, You Make the Best of What's Still Around" was included in the box set Message in a Box: The Complete Recordings.
