= Driven to Tears =

1980 song by the Police

Song by The Police

from the album Zenyatta Mondatta
- Released: 3 October 1980
- Genre: New wave
- Length: 3:20
- Label: A&M
- Songwriter: Sting
- Producers: The Police, Nigel Gray

Audio
- "Driven to Tears" on YouTube

"Driven to Tears" is a song written by Sting and first released by The Police on their 1980 album Zenyatta Mondatta. Although not released as a single, the song reached No. 35 on the Billboard Mainstream Rock Tracks chart. The political overtones of the song represent the beginning of the political activism that would recur throughout much of Sting's and the Police's subsequent music. On classic rock radio stations, the song is usually followed immediately by “When the World Is Running Down, You Make the Best of What's Still Around”, the next track on the album.

== Theme ==
The theme of the song is the divide between rich and poor. It was one of the first politically themed songs the Police released, and the first that Sting wrote. Sting was inspired to write the song while on tour in the United States in 1979 after seeing the plight of starving children in Biafra on television. Sting has stated that the title and song came to him because he was literally driven to tears by the show. The song asks questions but finds no answers. One line of the song refers to the fact that people can afford the technology to watch television, but not food for the starving children.

== Composition ==
The song is in the key of A minor. It incorporates a powerful eight bar guitar solo by Police guitarist Andy Summers, one of his few solos on Zenyatta Mondatta. Author Erica Starr has described Stewart Copeland's drum playing on the song as "jerky" and "syncopated" but that the beats "float around with great ease," noting that the song has "tremendous energy and forward momentum." Rolling Stone critic David Fricke points to "Driven to Tears" as an example of The Police indulging "their love for reggae," describing the song as "brooding." Allmusic critic Chris True describes the song as a "midtempo reggae workout."

Author Chris Welch states that "Driven to Tears" "surges with an unstoppable anger." The Washington Post music critic Robert Hull claimed that the song "has the driving force of Peter Green's Fleetwood Mac." Allmusic critic Chris True considers Summers' short guitar solo to be one of his best. Summers himself considered "Driven to Tears" one of the better songs Sting wrote that formed "the meat" of Zenyatta Mondatta.

== Live history ==
A live performance (circa 1980) of "Driven to Tears" is the opening number of the film Urgh! A Music War.

Sting played "Driven to Tears" at the Live Aid concert in 1985. He also released a live version on his solo album Bring on the Night in 1986. Both versions include a solo by saxophone player Branford Marsalis. A live version performed by the Police was released on the 1993 box set Message in a Box.

The song was included in the setlist for Sting's 2014 "On Stage Together" concert tour with legendary artist Paul Simon. This rendition featured a guitar and a violin solo performed by Sting's accompanying musicians.

Sting performed the song on January 30, 2025 at Intuit Dome in Inglewood, California for FireAid to help with relief efforts for the January 2025 Southern California wildfires.

== Covers ==
- "Driven to Tears" has been covered by Mike Portnoy, Neal Morse and Randy George on the 2012 album Cover 2 Cover.
- Marco Minnemann covered the song on the 2007 album Play the Police.
- Pearl Jam performed "Driven to Tears" on their 2003 and 2009 tours with the line, "too many cameras and not enough food" replaced with "...and not enough truth." Sting sang the song with Pearl Jam at Madison Square Garden on May 2, 2016.
- Actor Robert Downey, Jr. sang the song with Sting at Sting's 60th birthday concert at the Beacon Theatre in New York City on October 1, 2011.

== Personnel ==
- Sting – bass guitar, vocals
- Andy Summers – guitar
- Stewart Copeland – drums
