= Behind My Camel =

1980 instrumental by the Police

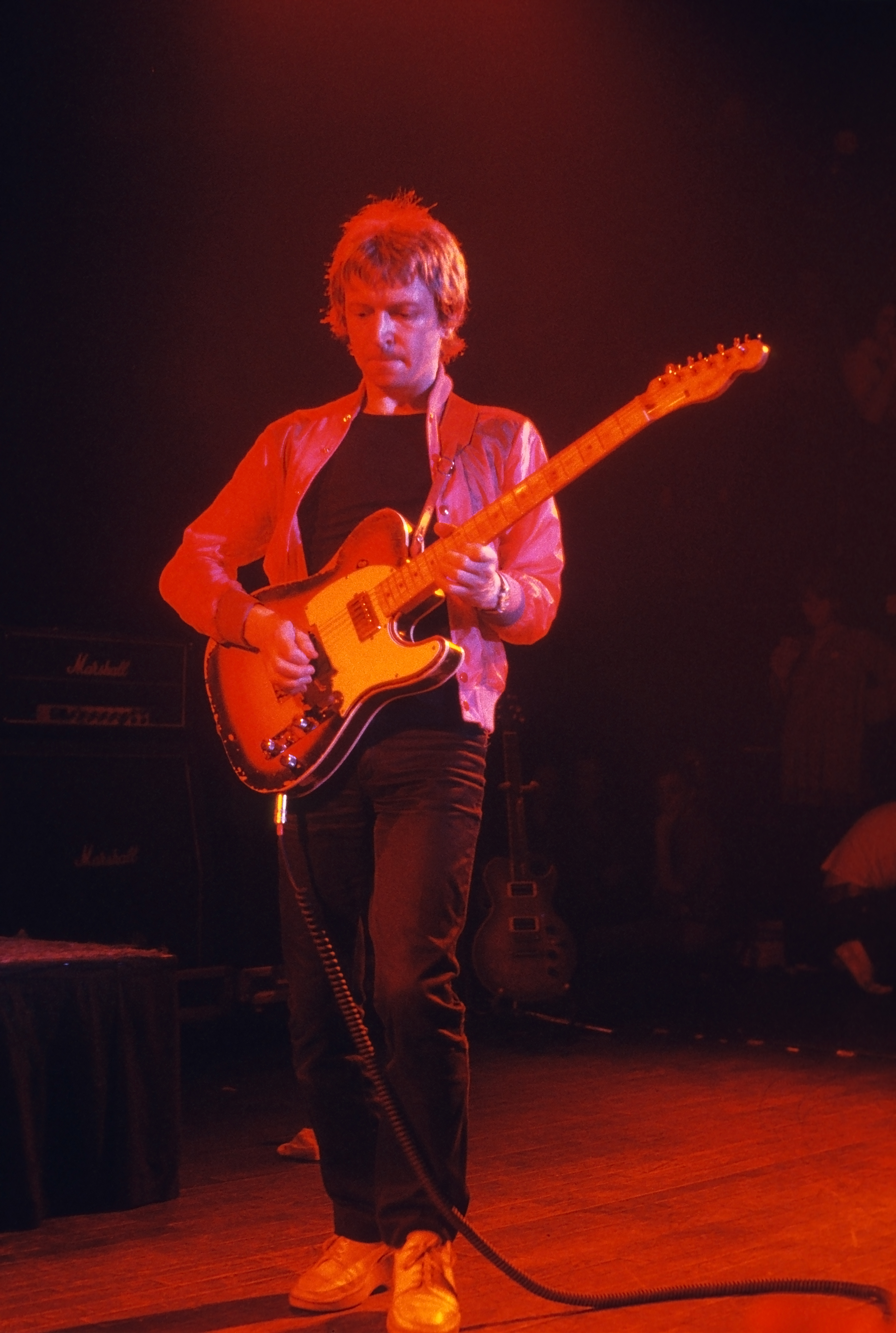
- Andy Summers performing in 1979

Instrumental by the Police

from the album Zenyatta Mondatta
- Released: 3 October 1980
- Recorded: 1980
- Studio: Wisseloord (Hilversum)
- Genre: Instrumental rock
- Length: 2:54
- Label: A&M
- Composer: Andy Summers
- Producer: The Police

Audio
- "Behind My Camel" on YouTube

"Behind My Camel" is the eighth track from the 1980 album Zenyatta Mondatta by the English rock band the Police. The song was written by guitarist Andy Summers and was the first one to be composed solely by him during his career in the Police. It won the Grammy Award of 1982 for the Best Rock Instrumental Performance.

The song features a simple, yet eerie guitar melody, which is quasi-Arabic in style (hence the title), a repetitive bass riff played by Summers himself because of Sting opting out, drums played by Stewart Copeland, and atmospheric keyboards.

Ultimate Classic Rock critic Mike Duquette called it "one of the more accomplished Police instrumentals, thanks to Summers’ Eastern-influenced guitar work."

== Response of other band members ==
"Behind My Camel" was not very popular with the two other band members, especially Sting.

"I hated that song so much that, one day when I was in the studio, I found the tape lying on the table. So I took it around the back of the studio and actually buried it in the garden."

— Sting, Revolver 4/2000

Stewart Copeland was not in favour of the song either:

"As hard done by as I ever felt in this band, I could always take comfort in the fact that Andy got shafted even worse than I did on that little instrumental. Sting didn't even bother to play on it. Andy played all the bass and guitars, and I only played on the song because there wasn't anyone else to play drums."

— Stewart Copeland, Revolver 4/2000

In Chris Campion's Police biography Walking on the Moon, Police producer Nigel Gray believes that the title was an in-joke by Andy Summers:

"He didn't tell me this himself but I'm 98% sure the reason is this: what would you find behind a camel? A monumental pile of shit."

— Nigel Gray, Walking on the Moon
