= Secret Journey (song) =

1982 single by the Police

Single by the Police

from the album Ghost in the Machine
- B-side: "Darkness"
- Released: April 1982
- Recorded: 1981
- Genre: New wave; reggae
- Length: 3:34
- Label: A&M 2408-S
- Songwriter: Sting
- Producers: The Police; Hugh Padgham

The Police singles chronology
"Spirits in the Material World" (1981)	"Secret Journey" (1982)	"Every Breath You Take" (1983)

Back cover

Audio
- "Secret Journey" on YouTube

"Secret Journey" is a song by the Police from their fourth studio album, Ghost in the Machine (1981). Written by Sting, the song tells of a mystical journey that will make the traveller a "holy man".

Although "Secret Journey" was not released as a single in Europe, the song did see a single release in some countries, such as the United States and Canada.

== Background ==
According to Sting, the lyrical inspiration for "Secret Journey" was the 1963 novel Meetings with Remarkable Men, written by George Gurdjieff. Sting said the following about the song:

"It's a quasi-mystical song. You have to do something, go somewhere, to get outside yourself. I read the book Meetings with Remarkable Men which says you have to make a journey. It doesn't have to be a real journey, it can be a mental journey."

— Sting, Ghost in the Machine press release, October 1981

Sting mentioned the song in Lyrics by Sting, saying, "I was looking for some spiritual guidance in my own life and, after a few false leads, finally began to listen to the discrete language of my own heart."

"Secret Journey" was released as a single in May 1982 in the United States and Canada, as an alternative to the single "Invisible Sun" which was only released in some parts of Europe, such as the United Kingdom and Ireland. It was also released as a single in Australia (the only country to receive both the "Invisible Sun" and "Secret Journey" singles) and New Zealand.

The song charted at No. 29 on the Billboard Mainstream Rock chart and also reached No. 46 on the Billboard Hot 100.

The B-side of "Secret Journey" was "Darkness", a Stewart Copeland penned track that was also from Ghost in the Machine. Copeland said of the track in 2000, "Darkness is a song about vertigo. I'm very proud of it, and there's not really much to say about it."

The song was performed live only in America for ten days on the Ghost in the Machine Tour.

=== Reception ===
In the liner notes for Ghost in the Machine, "Secret Journey" was called a "superb song", while in the Melody Maker review of the album, it was called "the record's highest moment." Giovanni Dadamo of The Face said the track was one of the "magic moments" on Ghost in the Machine, and it was also described as "perhaps the best cut on the album" by Chart Songwords. It received a positive review from AllMusic's Greg Prato. Ultimate Classic Rock critic Mike Duquette rated it as the Police's 20th greatest song.

The Police's guitarist, Andy Summers, described "Secret Journey" as one of his personal favourite Police songs, saying, "I always thought that should have been a single."

== Personnel ==
- Sting – lead and backing vocals, bass
- Andy Summers – guitars, Roland GR300 guitar synthesizer
- Stewart Copeland – drums, percussion

== Track listing ==
=== 7-inch: A&M / AM 2408-S (US) ===
1. "Secret Journey" – 3:34
2. "Darkness" – 3:14

== Charts ==
Chart (1982)	Peak position
US Billboard Hot 100	46
US Billboard Top Rock Tracks	29
US Cashbox	47
