= Ghost in the Machine (album) =

Studio album by the Police
- Released: 2 October 1981
- Recorded: June–July 1981
- Studios: AIR, Montserrat; Le Studio, Morin-Heights ("Every Little Thing She Does Is Magic")
- Genres: New wave; avant-pop
- Length: 41:03
- Languages: English; French ("Hungry for You")
- Label: A&M
- Producers: The Police; Hugh Padgham

The Police chronology
Zenyatta Mondatta (1980)	Ghost in the Machine (1981)	Synchronicity (1983)

Singles from Ghost in the Machine
- 1. "Invisible Sun" Released: 18 September 1981; 2. "Every Little Thing She Does Is Magic" Released: 16 October 1981; 3. "Spirits in the Material World" Released: 4 December 1981; 4. "Secret Journey" Released: April 1982 (US)

Ghost in the Machine is the fourth studio album by the English rock band the Police. The album was released on 2 October 1981 by A&M Records. The songs were recorded between January and September 1981 during sessions that took place at AIR Studios in Montserrat and Le Studio in Quebec, assisted by record producer Hugh Padgham.

Ghost in the Machine topped the UK Albums Chart and peaked at number two on the US Billboard 200. The album produced the highly successful singles "Every Little Thing She Does Is Magic", "Invisible Sun", and "Spirits in the Material World", with a fourth single, "Secret Journey", also being released in the US. Ghost in the Machine was listed at number 322 on Rolling Stone's list of the 500 greatest albums of all time. The album was reissued in 1983 on CD.

== Production and recording ==
After having produced the previous album Zenyatta Mondatta within a tight deadline of four weeks under pressure from the record company to deliver an album to the market, the Police decided to loosen up when it came to recording Ghost in the Machine. This time they spent six weeks recording at AIR Studios in Montserrat, which was, according to drummer Stewart Copeland, "a 12 hour flight from the nearest record company".

This album marked a change in engineer/co-producer, from Nigel Gray – who worked on the band's albums up to that point – to Hugh Padgham, best known for the drum sound he achieved on records by Peter Gabriel and Phil Collins (see gated reverb). In fact, for this album, Padgham initiated a technique in which the band were recording together in separate rooms of the AIR Studios facility: Andy Summers in the main studio with all his guitars and amplifiers; Sting in the control room with his bass directly plugged into the desk; and Copeland in the dining room with his drums to get a "live" sound. This method would be repeated for the next album.

Ghost in the Machine was the first Police album to feature heavy use of keyboards and saxophone. Besides keyboards, the twenty minute section comprising “Hungry for You (J'aurais toujours faim de toi)" through "One World (Not Three)" includes many saxophone harmonies, while the opening to "Secret Journey" showcases the Roland GR-300 Guitar Synthesizer. Summers recollected:

I have to say I was getting disappointed with the musical direction around the time of Ghost in the Machine. With the horns and synth coming in, the fantastic raw-trio feel—all the really creative and dynamic stuff—was being lost. We were ending up backing a singer doing his pop songs.

For the album, much of the arrangements were worked out at demo stage; as Summers observed, the band's individual demos were too complete; this did not leave much room for the other members to contribute ideas, this being a delicate area for them. The band's frontman, Sting, recorded a demo of "Every Little Thing She Does Is Magic" at Le Studio, inviting keyboardist Jean Roussel. However, the group could not improve on it at AIR Studios; they ended up using the demo as the backing track for the official recording, with drummer Stewart Copeland and guitarist Andy Summers overdubbing their parts. Sting also played all the saxophone parts on the album.

The album opens with "Spirits in the Material World", featuring keyboards dubbed over Summers' reggae-inspired guitar licks. "Every Little Thing She Does Is Magic" features piano, a Caribbean vibe, and an extended non-verbal vocal solo at the end. "Invisible Sun" is a mixture of slow, steady verses, a bombastic chorus, and several guitar solos. "Hungry for You (J'aurais toujours faim de toi)" is sung mostly in French, with the bass and saxophones both repeating a single 8-note melody for the length of the song, while the guitar maintains a steady beat. "Demolition Man", the band's longest song—almost six minutes in length—features a prominent bass line and saxophone, and was written by Sting while staying at Peter O'Toole's Irish mansion. The song was originally given to Jamaican singer Grace Jones, who released her rendition on Nightclubbing earlier in 1981; the Police then recorded their own hard rock version for Ghost in the Machine. A solo recording by Sting became a belated hit in 1993 as the theme song for the action film of the same title, starring Sandra Bullock, Sylvester Stallone and Wesley Snipes. Manfred Mann's Earth Band also recorded a version—rearranged and with extensive use of synthesizers—in 1982 for their Somewhere in Afrika album.

"Too Much Information", "Rehumanize Yourself", and "One World (Not Three)" are centered around multiple saxophone riffs. As with "Landlord" and "Dead End Job", Copeland had written both music and lyrics for "Rehumanize Yourself", but Sting rejected the lyrics and replaced them with those he composed himself. The final three songs, "Omegaman", "Secret Journey", and "Darkness", return to the darker sound which opens the album.

== Artwork and titling ==
Much of the material on the album was inspired by Arthur Koestler's The Ghost in the Machine, which also provided the title. It was the first Police album to bear an English-language title. In his younger days Sting was an avid reader of Koestler. Koestler said he was "slightly tickled" by the homage. In the 2012 Can't Stand Losing You: Surviving the Police documentary, Summers commented that the title felt fitting as he was going through a divorce at the time and the band was not getting along during production. The subsequent Police album Synchronicity was inspired by Koestler's The Roots of Coincidence, which mentions Carl Jung's theory of synchronicity.

The cover art for Ghost in the Machine features a sixteen-segment display-inspired graphic that depicts the heads of the three band members, each with a distinctive hairstyle. The album's cover is ranked at number 45 on VH1's "50 Greatest Album Covers".

== Commercial performance ==
Ghost in the Machine debuted at number one on the UK Albums Chart and spent three weeks atop the chart. In the United States, it reached number two on the Billboard 200.

According to Andy Summers, "Omegaman" was chosen by A&M Records to be the first single from the album, but Sting refused to allow it. "Invisible Sun" was ultimately released as the album's first single in the UK and was a success, reaching number two on the UK Singles Chart, even though its music video was banned by the BBC for including footage of the conflict in Northern Ireland.

"Every Little Thing She Does Is Magic" was released as the album's second overall single, and as the first single in most other territories, becoming the band's fourth UK number one and peaking at number three on the US Billboard Hot 100. "Spirits in the Material World" followed, peaking at number 12 in the UK and number 11 in the US. "Secret Journey" was released as a single in the US, where it charted at number 46.

== Critical reception ==
Professional ratings
Review scores
Source	Rating
AllMusic	3.5/5 stars
The Austin Chronicle	4/5 stars
Chicago Tribune	2.5/4 stars
The Philadelphia Inquirer	4/5 stars
Record Mirror	5/5 stars
Rolling Stone	4/5 stars
The Rolling Stone Album Guide	4/5 stars
The Sacramento Bee	4/4 stars
Smash Hits	6/10
The Village Voice	B+

The reception for Ghost in the Machine was mostly positive. Rolling Stone's Debra Rae Cohen found that the Police "display more commitment, more real anger, on Ghost in the Machine than ever before." In Record Mirror, Robin Smith praised the album as "the best thing they've ever done", noting its "overall sense of dedication and quality" and more varied range of musical styles. Robert Christgau of The Village Voice remarked: "It's pointless to deny that they make the chops work for the common good—both their trickiness and their simplicity provide consistent pleasure here." Smash Hits critic Mark Ellen was less receptive, deeming it a "patchy" album with both "dazzling singles" and filler tracks reminiscent of the band's earlier material. Ghost in the Machine was voted the 24th best album of 1981 in The Village Voice's Pazz & Jop critics' poll.

In a retrospective review of Ghost in the Machine, Greg Prato of AllMusic observed that the Police "had streamlined their sound to focus more on their pop side and less on their trademark reggae-rock." He found that the album was "not a pop masterpiece", but "did serve as an important stepping stone between their more direct early work and their more ambitious latter direction." J. D. Considine, writing in 2004's The New Rolling Stone Album Guide, stated that "well-modulated" compositions such as "Spirits in the Material World" and "Every Little Thing She Does Is Magic" reflected the band's continued experimentation with more dynamic rhythms.

In 2000, Q placed Ghost in the Machine at number 76 on its list of the "100 Greatest British Albums Ever". Pitchfork ranked Ghost in the Machine at number 86 on its 2002 list of the 100 best albums of the 1980s. It was ranked at number 322 on Rolling Stone's 2003 list of the 500 greatest albums of all time, and at number 323 in a 2012 update of the list. The Guardian featured the record in its 2007 list of "1000 Albums to Hear Before You Die".

Writing in 2021 for a Best Albums of 1981 list, Paste magazine contributor Saby Reyes-Kulkarni observed that "There are albums that envelope you in an ambience so unlike anything else you’ve ever heard that listening to them is like taking a trip to another world," further describing Ghost in the Machine as "the most sonically unified work of [The Police's] career, a seamless and revolutionary integration of reggae into [the band's style] that, like Talking Heads and Peter Gabriel, established a futurist vision of pop that could absorb sounds from all over the world—in some ways, pop music has operated from the same premise ever since."

== Alternate sequence release ==
In 2022, the band released a reissue of the album containing a different track order, and three additional tracks not included on the original album: "I Burn for You", "Once Upon a Daydream", and "Shambelle". "I Burn for You" was originally released on the soundtrack album for the film Brimstone and Treacle, whereas the other two songs were originally B-sides to singles from the album. All 3 additional tracks had been previously released on Message in a Box: The Complete Recordings.

== Track listing ==
All tracks are written by Sting, except where noted.

Side one
No.	Title	Length
1.	"Spirits in the Material World"	2:59
2.	"Every Little Thing She Does Is Magic"	4:22
3.	"Invisible Sun"	3:44
4.	"Hungry for You (J'aurais toujours faim de toi)"	2:52
5.	"Demolition Man"	5:57

Side two
No.	Title	Writer(s)	Length
6.	"Too Much Information"		3:43
7.	"Rehumanize Yourself"	Sting; Stewart Copeland	3:10
8.	"One World (Not Three)"		4:47
9.	"Omegaman" (stylised as "Ωmegaman")	Andy Summers	2:48
10.	"Secret Journey"		3:34
11.	"Darkness"	Copeland	3:14
Total length:			41:03

== Personnel ==
Credits are adapted from the album's liner notes.

=== The Police ===
- Sting – vocals, bass (1, 3, 6–10), electric upright bass (2, 4, 11), saxophone (1, 4–8)
- Andy Summers – guitars, guitar synthesizer (9, 10)
- Stewart Copeland – drums, percussion, synthesizers (Prophet-5, Minimoog), piano (11)

==== Additional musicians ====
- Jean Roussel – piano (2)
- Danny Quatrochi – bass (5), additional bass (uncredited)

=== Technical ===
- Produced by The Police and Hugh Padgham
- Engineered by Hugh Padgham
- Additional engineer (uncredited) – Nick Blagona (2)
- Mastered by Ted Jensen
- Art direction – Jeffrey Kent Ayeroff and Mick Haggerty
- Artwork and design – Mick Haggerty

== Charts ==
=== Weekly charts ===
Weekly chart performance for Ghost in the Machine
Chart (1981–1982)	Peak position
Australian Albums (Kent Music Report)	1
Austrian Albums (Ö3 Austria)	11
Canada Top Albums/CDs (RPM)	1
Dutch Albums (Album Top 100)	1
German Albums (Offizielle Top 100)	4
Italian Albums (Musica e dischi)	1
Japanese Albums (Oricon)	29
New Zealand Albums (RMNZ)	5
Norwegian Albums (VG-lista)	5
Swedish Albums (Sverigetopplistan)	6
UK Albums (Official Charts)	1
US Billboard 200	2

=== Year-end charts ===
1981 year-end chart performance for Ghost in the Machine
Chart (1981)	Position
Australian Albums (Kent Music Report)	47
Canada Top Albums/CDs (RPM)	19
Dutch Albums (Album Top 100)	5
UK Albums (OCC)	5

1982 year-end chart performance for Ghost in the Machine
Chart (1982)	Position
Australian Albums (Kent Music Report)	63
Canada Top Albums/CDs (RPM)	42
Dutch Albums (Album Top 100)	55
German Albums (Offizielle Top 100)	68
New Zealand Albums (RMNZ)	35
US Billboard 200	10

== Certifications and sales ==
Certifications and sales for Ghost in the Machine
Region	Certification	Certified units/sales
Australia (ARIA)	Platinum	50,000^{^}
Canada (Music Canada)	Platinum	100,000^{^}
France (SNEP)	Gold	100,000^{*}
Germany (BVMI)	Gold	250,000^{^}
Italy	—	200,000
New Zealand (RMNZ)	Platinum	15,000^{^}
United Kingdom (BPI)	Platinum	500,000
United States (RIAA)	3× Platinum	3,000,000^{^}
Yugoslavia	—	36,056
^{*} Sales figures based on certification alone.^{^} Shipments figures based on certification alone.
