= Zenyatta Mondatta =

1980 studio album by the Police

Studio album by the Police
- Released: 3 October 1980
- Recorded: 7 July – 7 August 1980
- Studio: Wisseloord (Hilversum)
- Genres: New wave; post-punk; reggae rock
- Length: 38:16
- Label: A&M
- Producers: The Police; Nigel Gray

The Police chronology
Six Pack (1980)	Zenyatta Mondatta (1980)	Ghost in the Machine (1981)

Singles from Zenyatta Mondatta
- 1. "Don't Stand So Close to Me" Released: 19 September 1980; 2. "De Do Do Do, De Da Da Da" Released: October 1980 (US)

Zenyatta Mondatta (stylised as Zenyattà Mondatta on the album cover artwork) is the third studio album by the English rock band the Police, released on 3 October 1980 by A&M Records. It was co-produced by the band and Nigel Gray.

Zenyatta Mondatta reached number one on the UK Albums Chart and number five on the US Billboard 200. It produced the hit singles "Don't Stand So Close to Me" and "De Do Do Do, De Da Da Da". The album won the band two Grammy Awards: Best Rock Performance by a Duo or Group with Vocal for "Don't Stand So Close to Me" and Best Rock Instrumental Performance for "Behind My Camel".

== Recording ==
Zenyatta Mondatta was written during the Police's second tour and recorded in four weeks (minus two days for concerts in Ireland and at the Milton Keynes festival in the United Kingdom). The band members have often expressed disappointment over the album, going so far as to re-record two songs during a brief, unsuccessful reunion in 1986. Drummer Stewart Copeland said about the time pressures: "We had bitten off more than we could chew. ... we finished the album at 4 a.m. on the day we were starting our next world tour. We went to bed for a few hours and then traveled down to Belgium for the first gig. It was cutting it very fine."

The band had wanted to record the album at Surrey Sound, the recording site of their first two albums, but could not record at any British studio for tax reasons. They were, however, able to retain Nigel Gray as their co-producer, bringing him with them to Wisseloord Studios in the Netherlands. Feeling that he had played a significant part in the Police's first two albums, Gray negotiated for a £25,000 (£113,000 in 2024) fee, which brought the album's total budget to £35,000 (more than twice the combined budgets of their first two albums, but still exceptionally cheap for a band who at that point had become established stars).

As mentioned by Copeland, the Police embarked on a tour of the world the day of the album's completion, beginning in Belgium and finishing in Australia. However, the finished mixes did not sound as good as expected outside the studio - Gray attributed this to the studio monitoring at Wisseloord sounding very "bassy and trebly", thus not accurately representing the sound on tape. Thus, they re-mixed the album in one day at Strawberry Studios in Dorking, Surrey under pressure from the record company to meet the October 1980 release date.

== Composition ==
The album is the last of the Police's early era, influenced by reggae and punk and featuring few musical elements on top of the core guitar, bass, and drums.

The record has two instrumentals, "The Other Way of Stopping" (named from a line in Bob Newhart's "The Driving Instructor" routine) and "Behind My Camel". "Behind My Camel" was guitarist Andy Summers' first entirely self-penned composition. As bassist and vocalist Sting refused to play on it, Summers recorded the bass line himself, overdubbing the guitar parts. According to Sting, "I hated that song so much that, one day when I was in the studio, I found the tape lying on the table. So I took it around the back of the studio and actually buried it in the garden." Nigel Gray believed that the title was an in-joke by Summers: "He didn't tell me this himself but I'm 98% sure the reason is this: what would you find behind a camel? A monumental pile of shit."

"Bombs Away" was written and demoed using a Siouxsie and the Banshees tape. Copeland said that "when he first set up his home studio he got hold of a load of second hand tape which included some stuff by Siouxsie and the Banshees. 'Bombs Away' was written on a Siouxsie and the Banshees backing track. I changed the speed and did things to the EQ to change the drum pattern. So with the desk I can get my song playing, then press a switch and there's Siouxsie singing away."

Zenyatta Mondatta also saw the band's lyrics turning towards political events, with Sting's "Driven to Tears" commenting on poverty and Copeland's "Bombs Away" referring to the Soviet invasion of Afghanistan. These themes became more prevalent on the Police's next album, Ghost in the Machine.

== Title ==
Stewart Copeland said that the group arrived at the album's title after deciding it should roll off the tongue. Zenyatta and Mondatta are invented words, hinting at Zen, at Jomo Kenyatta, at the French for 'the world' (le monde), and at reggatta, from the title of the previous Police album, Reggatta de Blanc. As Copeland explained:

It means everything. It's the same explanation that applies to the last two. It doesn't have a specific meaning like "Police Brutality" or "Police Arrest", or anything predictable like that. Being vague it says a lot more. You can interpret it in a lot of different ways. It's not an attempt to be mysterious, just syllables that sound good together, like the sound of a melody that has no words at all has a meaning. Miles (Stewart Copeland's brother and group manager) came up with "Trimondo Blondomina". Very subtle. Geddit? Like three blondes and the world. Then somebody thought of "Caprido Von Renislam". That rolls off the tongue. It was the address of the studio (Catharina van Renneslaan in Hilversum, The Netherlands).

Jerry Moss, co-founder of A&M Records, named the champion racehorse Zenyatta (born 2004) after the album. Blizzard Entertainment also named a character Zenyatta (and his brother, non-playable character – Mondatta) in the video game Overwatch. Additionally, in the English translation of the manga Stardust Crusaders published by VIZ Media, the characters Oingo and Boingo are renamed Zenyatta and Mondatta due to copyright laws.

== Release ==
During the month of its release, Virgin Records declined to allow individuals in the United Kingdom to import or sell North American copies of Zenyatta Mondatta. It debuted at number one on the UK Albums Chart and stayed atop the chart for four weeks. The album also peaked at number one in Australia. In the United States, it spent almost three years on the Billboard 200 chart and peaked at number five.

The album produced two singles, "Don't Stand So Close to Me" and "De Do Do Do, De Da Da Da". On the UK Singles Chart, the former became the band's third number one, while the latter reached number five. The two singles also became the band's first top ten hits on the US Billboard Hot 100, with both peaking at number ten on the chart.

A&M Records first remastered the album for release in compact disc format in the US in 1990. Frank DeLuna and Marv Bornstein mastered the original 1980 vinyl LP.

Sting would later record his own version of "Shadows in the Rain" on his 1985 debut solo album The Dream of the Blue Turtles. In 1986, the Police re-recorded "Don't Stand So Close to Me" and "De Do Do Do, De Da Da Da". The former was released on Every Breath You Take: The Singles, while the latter was released on the DTS version of Every Breath You Take: The Classics. "When the World Is Running Down, You Make the Best of What's Still Around" was remixed by the production duo Different Gear and released as a single in 2000, credited to "Different Gear vs. The Police". It reached number 28 on the UK Singles Chart.

== Critical reception ==
Professional ratings
Review scores
Source	Rating
AllMusic	5/5 stars
Chicago Tribune	3.5/4 stars
Christgau's Record Guide	B
Rolling Stone	5/5 stars
The Rolling Stone Album Guide	4.5/5 stars
The Sacramento Bee	3.5/4 stars
Smash Hits	8/10
Sounds	4/5 stars
Tampa Bay Times	A
Uncut	3/5 stars

In a 1980 review for Rolling Stone, David Fricke praised Zenyatta Mondatta as "near-perfect pop by a band that bends all the rules and sometimes makes musical mountains out of molehill-size ideas", complimenting the band's "elastic" interplay. High Fidelity thought that the Police had "hit full stride with this delightful LP" with their integration of multiple genres.

Phil Sutcliffe of Sounds wrote that he initially viewed the album as inferior to the band's earlier material, but came to recognise its strength, despite still finding it somewhat unadventurous: "By word and note it's as articulate and literate as you might hope. It avoids a whole catalogue of megastar pitfalls. Zenyatta is not pretentious, not bombastic, not lazy." In Smash Hits, David Hepworth opined that Sting had particularly improved as a vocalist and songwriter, describing his compositions as "tougher, more concerned, but no less melodic."

Zenyatta Mondatta was voted the 28th best album of 1980 in The Village Voice's year-end Pazz & Jop critics' poll. At the Grammy Awards in 1982, "Don't Stand So Close to Me" won for Best Rock Performance by a Duo or Group with Vocal, while "Behind My Camel" won for Best Rock Instrumental Performance, marking the Police's second consecutive win in the latter category.

Retrospectively, AllMusic critic Greg Prato cited Zenyatta Mondatta as "arguably the best Police album" and "one of the finest rock albums of all time." In 2004's The New Rolling Stone Album Guide, J. D. Considine highlighted the more pronounced groove of the music: "The emphasis on rhythmic intensity made the songs catchier (as 'Voices Inside My Head' shows, the band certainly knew how to work a vamp), and the rhythmic dynamics add a singular punch to the material."

== Track listing ==
All tracks are written by Sting, except where noted.

Side one
No.	Title	Writer(s)	Length
1.	"Don't Stand So Close to Me"		4:04
2.	"Driven to Tears"		3:20
3.	"When the World Is Running Down, You Make the Best of What's Still Around"		3:38
4.	"Canary in a Coalmine"		2:26
5.	"Voices Inside My Head"		3:53
6.	"Bombs Away"	Stewart Copeland	3:06

Side two
No.	Title	Writer(s)	Length
7.	"De Do Do Do, De Da Da Da"		4:09
8.	"Behind My Camel" (instrumental)	Andy Summers	2:54
9.	"Man in a Suitcase"		2:19
10.	"Shadows in the Rain"		5:04
11.	"The Other Way of Stopping" (instrumental)	Copeland	3:22
Total length:			38:16

== Personnel ==
Credits are adapted from the album's liner notes.

=== The Police ===
- Sting – bass (1–7, 9–11), lead vocals, backing vocals, synthesizers
- Andy Summers – guitar, backing vocals, guitar synthesizer (1), piano (4), synthesizers (8), bass (8)
- Stewart Copeland – drums, backing vocals

=== Technical ===
- Produced by The Police and Nigel Gray
- Engineered by Nigel Gray
- Assistant engineer – Ronald Prent (uncredited)
- Mastered by Marv Bornstein and Frank DeLuna
- Art direction – Michael Ross
- Design – Michael Ross and Simon Ryan
- Front cover photography – Janette Beckman
- Back cover photography – Watal Asanuma, Miles Copeland, Danny Quatrochi
- Inner sleeve photography – Danny Quatrochi, Watal Asanuma, Miles Copeland, Michael Ross, Janette Beckman, Anton Corbijn, Gabor Scott, Adrian Boot, Kim Turner, Akihiro Takayama

== Charts ==
=== Weekly charts ===
Weekly chart performance for Zenyatta Mondatta
Chart (1980–1981)	Peak position
Australian Albums (Kent Music Report)	1
Austrian Albums (Ö3 Austria)	14
Canada Top Albums/CDs (RPM)	1
Dutch Albums (Album Top 100)	2
German Albums (Offizielle Top 100)	5
Italian Albums (Musica e dischi)	2
Japanese Albums (Oricon)	13
New Zealand Albums (RMNZ)	3
Norwegian Albums (VG-lista)	16
Swedish Albums (Sverigetopplistan)	8
UK Albums (Official Charts)	1
US Billboard 200	5

=== Year-end charts ===
Annual chart rankings for Zenyatta Mondatta
Chart (1980)	Position
Australian Albums (Kent Music Report)	31
Canada Top Albums/CDs (RPM)	45
Dutch Albums (Album Top 100)	11
Italian Albums (Musica e dischi)	24
UK Albums (OCC)	2

Chart (1981)	Position
Australian Albums (Kent Music Report)	11
Canada Top Albums/CDs (RPM)	16
Dutch Albums (Album Top 100)	84
German Albums (Offizielle Top 100)	6
Italian Albums (Musica e dischi)	17
New Zealand Albums (RMNZ)	25
US Billboard 200	9

== Certifications and sales ==
Certifications and sales for Zenyatta Mondatta
Region	Certification	Certified units/sales
Australia (ARIA)	Platinum	100,000
Canada (Music Canada)	Platinum	300,000
France (SNEP)	Platinum	400,000^{*}
Germany (BVMI)	Gold	250,000^{^}
Italy	—	300,000
New Zealand (RMNZ)	Platinum	15,000^{^}
United Kingdom (BPI)	Platinum	1,000,000
United States (RIAA)	2× Platinum	3,000,000
^{*} Sales figures based on certification alone.^{^} Shipments figures based on certification alone.
