= De Do Do Do, De Da Da Da =

1980 single by the Police

Single by the Police

from the album Zenyatta Mondatta
- B-side: "Friends" (US); "A Sermon" (UK)
- Released: October 1980 (US); 5 December 1980 (UK)
- Length: 4:09
- Label: A&M – AMS 9110
- Songwriter: Sting
- Producers: Nigel Gray; Stewart Copeland; Sting; Andy Summers

The Police singles chronology
| "Don't Stand So Close to Me" (1980) | "De Do Do Do, De Da Da Da" (1980) | "Invisible Sun" (1981) |

Alternative cover
- US 7-inch cover

Music video
- "De Do Do Do, De Da Da Da" on YouTube

"De Do Do Do, De Da Da Da" is a song by the English rock band the Police, released as a single in 1980. Released as the lead single in the US and second single in the UK from their album Zenyatta Mondatta, the song was written by Sting as a comment on how people love simple-sounding songs. The song was re-recorded in 1986 as "De Do Do Do, De Da Da Da '86" but not released until 1995.

== Background ==
According to lead singer Sting, the song is about the attraction that people have to simple songs. Sting later criticised those who labelled the lyrics of the song as "baby talk," claiming that the song was grossly misunderstood. He explained, "The lyrics are about banality, about the abuse of words," saying that "the lyrics have an internal logic."

I was trying to make an intellectual point about how the simple can be so powerful. Why are our favourite songs 'Da Doo Ron Ron' and 'Do Wah Diddy Diddy'? In the song, I tried to address that issue. But everyone said, 'This is bullshit, child's play.' No one listened to the lyrics. Listen to the lyrics. I'm going to remake it again and put more emphasis on what I was talking about.

— Sting, Rolling Stone, February 1988

Sting also said that "I was trying to say something which was really quite difficult – that people like politicians, like myself even, use words to manipulate people, and that you should be very careful."

The phrase "De Do Do Do, De Da Da Da" supposedly was made up by Sting's son. Sting said of this, "In fact, my son came up with it. I've never paid him – so that's another possible lawsuit. He writes songs himself these days. He's got a lot of self-confidence – I don't know where from."

The song was prominently featured in the 1982 film The Last American Virgin and on its soundtrack. It also appeared in the pilot episode of the medical drama St. Elsewhere.

== Composition ==
The song is composed in the key of A major with the chord progression of Asus2-F#m7(add4)-C#m7 in the verses and Asus2-A-Asus2-A-E-D in the chorus. The song uses an EHX Electric Mistress flanger in the verses.

"I've danced in the Caribbean for weeks to that song," remarked Joni Mitchell. "I'm an old rock and roll dancer, you know. The stops, the pauses, in that one are really fun. I appreciated the rhythmic hybrids, the gaps between the bass lines, the repetitive figures with space between them. James Taylor and I had dinner with Sting once at our mutual manager's place. He was quite effusive about us being his heroes. So I always think of him as our son."

== Release ==
"De Do Do Do, De Da Da Da" was released as the follow-up single to "Don't Stand So Close to Me" in Britain, and was released as the debut single from Zenyatta Mondatta in America. Upon its release, the single became a top ten hit in the United Kingdom and the United States, reaching No. 5 on the UK Singles Chart and No. 10 on the Billboard Hot 100. In addition to its English-language release, both a Spanish-language and Japanese-language version of the song were recorded and released in their respective markets in early 1981.

Its B-side, "A Sermon," was originally written by Stewart Copeland in 1977 and is a parable about a band ruthlessly making it to the top. Copeland played most of the guitar as well, including the intro riff, while Andy Summers can be heard in the middle. For the US version of the single, "De Do Do Do De Da Da Da" was paired with "Friends", a composition by Andy Summers. The cover was designed by Hipgnosis and uses the title of the song to juxtapose an image of the band with one of a woman's hand reaching out to a telephone to call the police.

Record World said that "Sting's affecting vocals and a percussion-clad rhythm track have created retail/radio reaction that's strictly big business."

== Track listing ==
7-inch – A&M / AMS 9110 (UK)

1. "De Do Do Do, De Da Da Da" – 4:09
2. "A Sermon" – 2:34

7-inch – A&M / AM 2275 (US)

1. "De Do Do Do, De Da Da Da" – 4:09
2. "Friends" – 3:35

7-inch – A&M / AM 25000 (US)

1. "De Do Do Do, De Da Da Da" (Spanish Version) – 4:00
2. "De Do Do Do, De Da Da Da" (Japanese Version) – 4:00

== Music video ==
The music video depicts the band performing the song outdoors on a ski hill. The video was filmed in 1981 at the Gray Rocks ski resort in the Laurentian Mountains of Quebec, Canada.

== Personnel ==
- Sting – bass, lead and backing vocals
- Andy Summers – guitar, lead vocals on "Friends"
- Stewart Copeland – drums, guitar on "A Sermon"

== Charts ==
=== Weekly charts ===
| Chart (1980–1981) | Peak position |
|---|---|
| Australia (Kent Music Report) | 6 |
| Canada (CHUM) | 1 |
| Canada (RPM) | 5 |
| Dutch Top 40 | 11 |
| French Singles Chart | 22 |
| German Singles Chart | 15 |
| Irish Singles Chart | 2 |
| Italy (Musica e dischi) | 17 |
| NZ Singles Chart | 8 |
| South Africa (Springbok) | 4 |
| Spanish Singles Chart | 2 |
| UK Singles Chart | 5 |
| US Billboard Hot 100 | 10 |
| US Cash Box Top 100 | 13 |

=== Year-end charts ===
| Chart (1981) | Rank |
|---|---|
| Australia (Kent Music Report) | 72 |
| Canada | 56 |
| South Africa | 19 |
| US Billboard Hot 100 | 57 |
| US Cash Box | 96 |

== "De Do Do Do, De Da Da Da '86" ==
"De Do Do Do, De Da Da Da '86"

Song by the Police

from the album Every Breath You Take: The Classics
- Released: 1995
- Recorded: 1986
- Genre: Rock, new wave
- Label: A&M
- Songwriter: Sting
- Producers: Stewart Copeland, Sting, Andy Summers, Laurie Latham

The song was re-recorded in 1986, alongside "Don't Stand So Close to Me '86," for inclusion on the Every Breath You Take: The Singles compilation but was ultimately excluded from the album. It was released on the DTS-CD and SACD releases of the Every Breath You Take: The Classics album.
