= Every Little Thing She Does Is Magic =

Single by the Police

from the album Ghost in the Machine
- B-side: "Flexible Strategies" (UK); "Shambelle" (US)
- Released: 15 September 1981 (US); 16 October 1981 (UK)
- Recorded: January – July 1981
- Studio: Le Studio (Morin Heights, Quebec, Canada); AIR (Montserrat)
- Genre: New wave, reggae rock
- Length: 4:22 (album version); 3:58 (single version)
- Label: A&M – AMS 8174
- Songwriter: Sting
- Producers: The Police; Hugh Padgham

The Police singles chronology
"Invisible Sun" (1981)	"Every Little Thing She Does Is Magic" (1981)	"Spirits in the Material World" (1981)

Alternative cover
- US 7-inch cover

Audio sample
- file; help

Music video
- "Every Little Thing She Does Is Magic" on YouTube

"Every Little Thing She Does Is Magic" is a song by the English rock band The Police from their fourth studio album, Ghost in the Machine (1981). It was a hit single that reached the top of the charts in the United Kingdom in November 1981 and hit No. 3 on the US Billboard Hot 100 chart that same year.

The song, unusual for including Jean Alain Roussel, a guest keyboardist, dates back to a demo recorded by bassist and lead singer Sting in the house of Mike Howlett in the autumn of 1976. The popularity of "Every Little Thing She Does Is Magic" helped to make Ghost in the Machine one of the Police's most successful albums.

== Composition ==
Written in standard 4/4 time, "Every Little Thing She Does Is Magic" sets up a tension between the keys of D major and D minor, with the bass line rising up a lydian scale, including portions of the song with no recognisable key. It ultimately resolves to D major, signifying the excitement of romance.

The song is characterised as new wave, with elements of reggae. Sting evokes a reggae feel by emphasising his bass guitar parts at the beats of four and one in the chorus, and Stewart Copeland's drumming has reggae flourishes. The chiming notes of Caribbean steel drums are heard at the chorus. Unlike other Police songs, it features an arrangement dominated by piano and synthesisers. The lyrics concern unrequited love, telling the story of a hapless romantic who has attempted to pursue a romantic interest for a long period of time, but is too afraid to do so.

== Background ==
Although the song was recorded in 1981, Sting wrote it in early 1977 around the time of the Silver Jubilee of Elizabeth II, prior to the formation of the Police, when he had first moved to London. His split from his wife, Frances Tomelty, was controversial; as The Independent reported in 2006, Tomelty "just happened to be Trudie [Styler]'s best friend (Sting and Frances lived next door to Trudie in Bayswater, West London, for several years before the two of them became lovers)". In a 2025 interview, Sting revealed that Trudie Styler, whom he later married and is still married to, was his inspiration for the song. An early demo of the song can be heard on the Strontium 90 studio album Strontium 90: Police Academy (1997), which Sting recorded entirely by himself while the song was still fresh in his mind (according to Mike Howlett), using equipment in the loft of Howlett's home in Acton, London which included an acoustic guitar, a bass guitar, an African drum, a TEAC 4-track recorder and some cheap microphones. For Howlett, this demo is "a powerful testimony to the raw, undiluted talent that is Sting". The recording was made prior to the launch of the Portastudio in the late 1970s, which Sting would later use for writing and demoing songs for the Police. A second demo was recorded in January 1981 at Le Studio in Morin Heights, Canada, with Nick Blagona engineering, featuring a Roland CR-78 drum machine:

This was first recorded as a demo, with the piano figure, in a studio in Montreal. I had written the song long before the Police were successful, but it seemed a bit soft for the band at first. But the demo was really great. It sounded like a No 1 song to me. I took it to the band, who were reticent, still thinking it was soft. I was saying, "But listen, it's a hit." We tried to do it from scratch as the Police, but it didn't have the same energy as the demo. After a degree of hair-pulling and torturing on my part, I got the band to play over the top of my demo.

— Sting, The Independent, September 1993

Session keyboardist Jean Roussel was invited to play on the demo, to which he overdubbed multiple layers of piano, Minimoog synthesizer and clavinet. At the time, according to Roussel, Sting was considering using the song for a potential solo project before he decided to do the song with the Police. Sting later flew Roussel over to help re-record the track against the wishes of his bandmates Andy Summers and Stewart Copeland while they were recording the Ghost in the Machine album at AIR Studios, Montserrat. Summers did not approve of Roussel's involvement, stating that he was "incredibly pushy" and that "there wasn't room for him. He must have played 12 piano parts on that song alone." Copeland, however, said that Roussel "wasn't pushy ... He was just like us actually."

Feeling that the arrangement of the track was not enough like the Police style, Summers (who recalled, "as the guitar player I was saying, 'What the f**k is this? This is not the Police sound'") and the band tried to "Police-ify" the track by attempting different arrangements and styles, but none of them clicked. However, as Copeland remembers, the remaining two members of the band had to overdub onto Sting’s demo in the end:

"I remember saying, 'Okay put up Sting's original demo and I'll show you how crummy it is.' So Sting stood over me and waved me through all the changes. I did just one take, and that became the record. Then Andy did the same thing on the guitar. We just faced the music, bit the bullet, and used Sting's arrangements and demo. Damn."

— Stewart Copeland, Revolver, 2000

"I had to fight hard to put that song on the record. I convinced them and eventually Stewart played fantastically on the demo. It took a lot of work but I knew he could do it. He’s a fantastic drummer."

— Sting, Rick Beato, 2021

In the chorus, Sting, not knowing any other word which would rhyme with "magic," used the word "tragic." Copeland said of this moment, "I remember Sting for years trying to think of a rhyme for 'magic', as in 'Every Little Things She Does Is Magic.' I think the only word he could come up with, apart from 'tragic', was 'pelagic', which means 'ocean going'. There I was in my leather pants and punk hairdo, pondering the distinction between ocean-going and river-going fish."

=== Release and critical reception ===
"Every Little Thing She Does Is Magic" was released as the second single from Ghost in the Machine in UK and Ireland, while in most other parts of the world it was the lead single from the album. The song outperformed its predecessor in Britain, where it topped the charts. The song also hit No. 1 in Canada, Ireland and the Netherlands, No. 2 in Australia and Italy, and No. 5 in Norway. It reached No. 3 both in the Flanders region of Belgium and in the US, becoming (along with "King of Pain") the band's second-best-performing single in the latter region, after its No. 1 hit "Every Breath You Take".

The lyrics of the second verse, "Do I have to tell the story / Of a thousand rainy days since we first met? / It's a big enough umbrella / But it's always me that ends up getting wet," were reprised by Sting at the end of the song "O My God" issued on the band's next studio album, Synchronicity. The lyrics were repeated once more in "Seven Days" on Sting's fourth solo studio album, Ten Summoner's Tales (1993). He later re-recorded the song in an orchestral version for his tenth studio album Symphonicities (2010).

Record World said that "There's urgency here that demands repeated listening." The song received a positive retrospective review from AllMusic journalist Chris True, who praised the lyrics and described the song as "pop brilliance". Ultimate Classic Rock critic Mike Duquette rated the song as the Police's 4th best, calling it "a heart-pounding love song for the ages."

The song's B-side, "Flexible Strategies", was reportedly an improvised jam that was created in response to the record company's demand for a B-side. Stewart Copeland said, "Word came down from the marketing machine 'Create a B-side – today! We walked over to the gear, strapped on, and played for ten minutes. A disgrace."

== Personnel ==
- Sting – bass guitar, electric upright bass, lead and backing vocals
- Andy Summers – guitars
- Stewart Copeland – drums
- Jean Alain Roussel – pianos, synthesizers, arrangement

== Track listing ==
=== 7-inch: A&M / AMS 8174 (UK) ===
1. "Every Little Thing She Does Is Magic" – 3:58
2. "Flexible Strategies" – 3:44

=== 7-inch: A&M / AMS 9170 (NL) ===
1. "Every Little Thing She Does Is Magic" – 4:05
2. "Shambelle" – 5:10

=== 7-inch: A&M / 2371-S (US) ===
1. "Every Little Thing She Does Is Magic" – 3:58
2. "Shambelle" – 5:06

== Chart performance ==
=== Weekly charts ===
Chart (1981–1982)	Peak position
Australia (Kent Music Report)	2
Belgium (Ultratop 50 Flanders)	3
Canada Top Singles (RPM)	1
Finland (Suomen virallinen lista)	15
Ireland (IRMA)	1
Italy (Musica e dischi)	2
Netherlands (Dutch Top 40)	1
Netherlands (Single Top 100)	1
New Zealand (Recorded Music NZ)	7
Norway (VG-lista)	5
South Africa (Springbok Radio)	12
UK Singles (Official Charts)	1
US Billboard Hot 100	3
US Cash Box Top 100	6
US Mainstream Rock Airplay (Billboard)	1
West Germany (GfK)	21

=== Year-end charts ===
Chart (1981)	Position
Australia (Kent Music Report)	58
Belgium (Ultratop Flanders)	30
Canada Top Singles (RPM)	12
Netherlands (Dutch Top 40)	3
Netherlands (Single Top 100)	4
UK Singles (OCC)	41
US Cash Box Top 100	35

Chart (1982)	Position
US Billboard Hot 100	79

== Certifications ==
Region	Certification	Certified units/sales
Italy (FIMI)	Gold	50,000^{‡}
New Zealand (RMNZ)	3× Platinum	90,000^{‡}
Spain (Promusicae)	Gold	30,000^{‡}
United Kingdom (BPI)	Platinum	600,000^{‡}
^{‡} Sales+streaming figures based on certification alone.

== See also ==
- List of European number-one hits of 1981
- List of number-one singles from the 1980s (UK)
- List of number-one mainstream rock hits (United States)
