= Don't Stand So Close to Me =

1980 single by the Police

- 1980 single cover

Single by the Police

from the album Zenyatta Mondatta
- B-side: "Friends" (UK); "A Sermon" (US)
- Released: 19 September 1980
- Recorded: 1980
- Genre: New wave; post-punk; reggae rock
- Length: 4:02
- Label: A&M (AMS 7564)
- Songwriter: Sting
- Producers: Nigel Gray; Stewart Copeland; Sting; Andy Summers

The Police singles chronology
"The Bed's Too Big Without You" (1980)	"Don't Stand So Close to Me" (1980)	"De Do Do Do, De Da Da Da" (1980)

Alternative cover
- American single picture sleeve

Music video
- "Don't Stand So Close to Me" on YouTube
- "Don't Stand So Close To Me (Christmas Version)" on YouTube

"Don't Stand So Close to Me" is a hit song by the English rock band the Police, released on 19 September 1980 as the lead single from their third studio album Zenyatta Mondatta. It concerns a teacher who has sexual fantasies about a student.

The band's third No. 1 on the UK Singles Chart, it was the best-selling single of 1980 in the UK, selling 808,000 copies in that year alone. The song also charted in the top ten in Australia, Canada, and the US Billboard Hot 100. The Police won the 1982 Grammy Award for Best Rock Performance by a Duo or Group with Vocal at the 24th Annual Grammy Awards for this song.

== Background ==
The music and lyric of the song were written by the lead vocalist of the Police, Sting. It deals with the mixed feelings of lust, fear and guilt that a schoolteacher has for a student and the fallout when the inappropriate relationship is discovered by other adults. The line "Just like the old man in that book by Nabokov" alludes to Vladimir Nabokov's novel Lolita (1955), which covers similar issues. The line was criticised for rhyming "shake and cough" with Nabokov. Sting replied, "I've used that terrible, terrible rhyme technique a few times."

Before joining the Police, Sting had worked as an English teacher. He referred to the song's story progression as "the teacher, the open page, the virgin, the rape in the car, getting the sack".

Sting has been inconsistent on sources of inspiration for the song. In a 1981 interview, he stated, "I'd done teaching practice at secondary schools and been through the business of having 15-year-old girls fancying me – and me really fancying them! How I kept my hands off them I don't know... Then there was my love for Lolita which I think is a brilliant novel."

Yet he spoke somewhat differently in a series of 1993 interviews, saying, "You have to remember we were blond bombshells at the time and most of our fans were young girls, so I started roleplaying a bit. Let's exploit that." He further distanced himself, citing business reasons: "To be frank, it was right in our market. A lot of teenage girls were buying our records. So the idea was, let's write a Lolita story." In a 2001 interview for the concert DVD ...All This Time, Sting again denied the song being autobiographical.

== Production ==
"Don't Stand So Close to Me" appeared on the Police album Zenyatta Mondatta (A&M), and became a No. 1 single on the UK Singles Chart, with a corresponding music video. In the US, it reached the top 10 on the Billboard Hot 100 chart, peaking at No. 10. In the UK, the track was confirmed by the end of 1980 to have been the biggest-selling single of that year.

The B-side, "Friends", was written by Andy Summers and is inspired by Stranger in a Strange Land, a science fiction novel by Robert A. Heinlein. Summers described the track as "Very quirky. A touch of Long John Silver on Acid."

Sting was asked to perform on Dire Straits’ "Money for Nothing" as he was in Montserrat at the time. The song reused the melody from "Don't Stand So Close to Me" in the counterpoint line "I want my MTV." It was only after this story was relayed to reporters during promotions for the Brothers in Arms album that lawyers for Sting became involved, and later copies of the album co-credit the song to Sting. The initial pressings list only Mark Knopfler.

== Composition ==
"Don't Stand So Close to Me" features Sting on lead vocals. Like many Police songs, the verses are more subdued, while the chorus is bolder and louder. The song also bears a reggae style, another common trait in Police songs.

The track features a guitar synthesiser in the middle of the song, used by guitarist Andy Summers. Summers said, "After Sting had put the vocals on 'Don't Stand So Close To Me' we looked for something to lift the middle of the song. I came up with a guitar synthesiser. It was the first time we'd used it. I felt it worked really well." The verses and choruses do not feature this effect.

The verses are in the key of G minor, and the chorus is in D major.

== Critical reception ==
Record World highlighted the song's "ingenious percussion, arrangement, and hook", believing that these elements could bring the song "all the way to the top" of the charts. Paul Sexton of Record Mirror called the single "pretty lightweight".

== Track listing ==
7-inch – A&M / AMS 7564 (UK)

1. "Don't Stand So Close to Me" – 4:03
2. "Friends" – 3:37

7-inch – A&M / AMS 2301 (US)

1. "Don't Stand So Close to Me" – 4:03
2. "A Sermon" – 2:34

2003 Stereo Remastered Version

1. "Don't Stand So Close to Me’86" – 4:51

== Personnel ==
- Sting – lead and backing vocals, bass guitar, bass pedals
- Andy Summers – guitars, guitar synthesiser
- Stewart Copeland – drums

== Chart history ==
=== Weekly charts ===
Chart (1980–1981)	Peak position
Argentina	6
Australia (Kent Music Report)	3
Belgium (Ultratop 50 Flanders)	8
Canadian Top Singles (RPM)	2
Denmark Top Singles (Hits Of The World)	1
Netherlands (Dutch Top 40)	3
Netherlands (Single Top 100)	3
Ireland (IRMA)	1
Italy (Musica e dischi)	3
New Zealand (Recorded Music NZ)	2
Norway (VG-lista)	9
South Africa (Springbok Radio)	3
Spain (Los 40 Principales)	1
Sweden (Sverigetopplistan)	14
UK Singles (Official Charts)	1
US Billboard Hot 100	10
US Mainstream Rock Airplay (Billboard)	11
US Cash Box Top 100	9
West Germany (GfK)	23

=== Year-end charts ===
Chart (1980)	Position
Australia (Kent Music Report)	63
Chart (1981)	Position
Australia (Kent Music Report)	75
Belgium (Ultratop Flanders)	58
Canadian Top Singles (RPM)	67
Netherlands (Dutch Top 40)	34
Netherlands (Single Top 100)	34
US Billboard Hot 100	71
US Cash Box	59

== Certifications and sales ==
Region	Certification	Certified units/sales
France	—	250,000
New Zealand (RMNZ)	Platinum	30,000^{‡}
United Kingdom (BPI)	Gold	1,000,000
^{‡} Sales+streaming figures based on certification alone.

=== UK chart history ===
"Don't Stand So Close To Me" quickly ascended to No. 1 in its first week of release on 27 September 1980, confirming their status as one of the UK's leading contemporary groups. It was also their third UK chart-topper in 12 months—in tandem with the No. 1 success of their new album Zenyatta Mondatta.

The band's four-week run at No. 1 was the most for any single in the UK in 1980. Having held off considerable competition from Ottawan with "D.I.S.C.O." and "Baggy Trousers" by Madness, the Police fell to No. 3 (being replaced at No. 1 by "Woman in Love" by Barbra Streisand). "Don't Stand So Close To Me" spent a total of 8 weeks inside the UK top 40, dropping out on 22 November. Three weeks later, their follow-up hit "De Do Do Do, De Da Da Da" charted at No. 9, eventually peaking at No. 5.

=== US chart history ===
"Don't Stand So Close To Me" debuted on the Billboard Hot 100 at No. 78 during the week of 7 February 1981. By 25 April, it reached a peak position of No. 10, matching their previous US hit "De Do Do Do, De Da Da Da". It dropped out of the top 40 on 23 May after a 13-week run.

=== Legacy ===
The song was heard in the 1994 season one episode "The One Where Underdog Gets Away" of the NBC sitcom Friends.

During the 2020 COVID-19 pandemic, "Don't Stand So Close To Me" took on a very different meaning in the context of COVID-19, as people worldwide practiced social distancing.

== "Don't Stand So Close to Me '86" ==
"Don't Stand So Close to Me '86"

Single by the Police

from the album Every Breath You Take: The Singles
- B-side: "Don't Stand So Close to Me" (Live)
- Released: 3 October 1986
- Recorded: July 1986
- Genre: Rock; new wave
- Length: 4:51
- Label: A&M
- Songwriter: Sting
- Producers: Stewart Copeland; Sting; Andy Summers; Laurie Latham

The Police singles chronology
"King of Pain" (1984)	"Don't Stand So Close to Me '86" (1986)	"Can't Stand Losing You" (1995)

Audio
- "Don't Stand So Close to Me '86" by the Police on YouTube

The song was re-recorded in 1986 with a new, brooding arrangement, a different chorus and a more opulent production. The new version appeared as "Don't Stand So Close to Me '86" on the album Every Breath You Take: The Singles, and was released as a single, reaching No. 24 in the British charts. It also reached No. 11 on the Irish Singles Chart, No. 14 in New Zealand, No. 19 on the Netherlands MegaCharts Singles Chart (number 20 on Dutch Top 40), No. 27 in Canada and No. 46 on Billboard Hot 100 (No. 10 on the Billboard Mainstream Rock chart).

A slight lyric change is found in the line "Just like the old man in that book by Nabokov" (the word 'famous' was added). A new music video was produced for the reworked song by Godley and Creme, notable for its early use of animated computer graphics. The version of the song used on the music video was subtly different to the version released as the single. It was approximately 6 seconds shorter, with a longer atmospheric break before the first lyric, but part of the chorus edited out towards the end. This version is only available on the music video; it has only been separately released as an audio recording in 2026, when the single was re-released on streaming format.

Because drummer Stewart Copeland had broken his collarbone and was unable to drum, he opted to use his Fairlight CMI to program the drum track for the single, while singer/bassist Sting pushed to use the drums on his Synclavier instead. The group's engineer found the Synclavier's programming interface difficult; it ended up taking him two days to complete the task. Copeland ultimately finished the drum programming and claimed that the Fairlight's then-legendary "Page R" (the device's sequencing page) saved him and put him on the map as a composer.

As the Police had already disbanded by the time the 1986 single was released, this, aside from the then-unreleased "De Do Do Do, De Da Da Da '86," was the last recording before the band's reunion and the most recent studio recording the band has released.

=== Track listing ===
7-inch – A&M / AM 354 (UK)

1. "Don't Stand So Close to Me '86" – 4:47
2. "Don't Stand So Close to Me" (live) – 3:40

12-inch – A&M / AMY 354 (UK)

1. "Don't Stand So Close to Me '86" (dance mix) – 6:32
2. "Don't Stand So Close to Me '86" – 4:47
3. "Don't Stand So Close to Me" (original version) – 4:03
4. "Don't Stand So Close to Me" (live) – 3:40

=== Charts ===
Chart (1986)	Peak position
Australia (Kent Music Report)	32
Spain (Los 40 Principales)	1
Dutch Top 40	19
Finland (Suomen virallinen lista)	13
Irish Singles Chart	11
UK Singles Chart	24
US Billboard Hot 100	46
Canadian Singles Chart	27

== Glee cover ==
"Don't Stand So Close to Me"

Single by Glee cast

from the album Glee: The Music, Volume 2
- B-side: "Young Girl"
- Released: 2009
- Recorded: 2009
- Genre: Pop
- Label: Columbia
- Songwriter: Sting
- Producers: Ryan Murphy, Adam Anders

Glee cast singles chronology
"I'll Stand by You" (2009)	"Don't Stand So Close to Me" (2009)	"Crush" (2009)

The song was covered in the first season episode "Ballad" of the American television series Glee in 2009. It was performed by the character Will Schuester (played by Matthew Morrison) as a musical mashup with "Young Girl" by Gary Puckett & the Union Gap. It was included on the second soundtrack album from the series.

The single version charted at No. 67 in Canada, No. 64 in the United States and No. 50 in Ireland.
