= Invisible Sun =

1981 single by the Police

Single by the Police

from the album Ghost in the Machine
- B-side: "Shambelle"
- Released: 18 September 1981
- Recorded: 1981
- Genre: New wave
- Length: 3:44
- Label: A&M – AMS 8164
- Songwriter: Sting
- Producers: The Police; Hugh Padgham

The Police singles chronology
"De Do Do Do, De Da Da Da" (1980)	"Invisible Sun" (1981)	"Every Little Thing She Does Is Magic" (1981)

Alternative cover
- Dutch 7-inch cover

Music video
- "Invisible Sun" on YouTube

"Invisible Sun" is a song by the English rock band the Police, released as a single in Europe on 18 September 1981 by A&M Records. It was the first single to be released in the United Kingdom from the band's fourth studio album Ghost in the Machine and it reached No. 2 on the UK singles chart. The song also reached No. 5 in Ireland and No. 27 in the Netherlands. It was not released as a single in North America nor in South America. In most other territories, "Every Little Thing She Does Is Magic" was chosen as the lead single from the album.

== Background ==
Sting said of writing "Invisible Sun":

I actually wrote the song in Ireland, where I was living at the time. It was during the hunger strikes in Belfast. I wanted to write about that but I wanted to show some light at the end of the tunnel. I do think there has to be an "invisible sun". You can't always see it, but there has to be something radiating light into our lives.

— Sting, Revolver, 2000

The song's lyrics stem from songwriter Sting's pondering how people living in war-torn and/or impoverished countries find the will to go on living, and despite the dark music and often morbid lyrical statements, the song carries an uplifting and optimistic message. The song was deeply personal for drummer Stewart Copeland, whose hometown of Beirut in Lebanon was being heavily bombed at the time of the song's recording:

For me, the song was about Beirut, where I'd grown up, which at that point was going up in flames. My hometown was being vilified by the media as a terrorist stronghold, and it was being blasted by bombs and napalm. Twenty thousand Lebanese were killed that year. And the Lebanese must have been feeling some heat from the invisible sun, because they were keeping their peckers up.

— Stewart Copeland, Revolver, 2000

Bono performed duets of it with Sting when U2 and the Police appeared at the same concerts: the first such instance was in 1982 at a festival in Gateshead, England, and two subsequent instances occurred at the last two shows of Amnesty International's A Conspiracy of Hope tour in 1986.

The song is a departure from Police songs before it; "Invisible Sun" contains a dark, looping synthesizer beat, and powerful, haunting lyrics. Among other things, the lyrics refer to the ArmaLite rifle used by paramilitary organisations, but mainly by the Provisional Irish Republican Army (IRA). The music video for "Invisible Sun" features a collection of video clips taken from the conflict in Northern Ireland. Owing to its subject matter, the video was banned by the BBC.

In 1998, Sting recorded a new version of "Invisible Sun" with the British reggae group Aswad. The song was revised as a duet between Sting and vocalist Tony "Gad" Robinson with an upbeat tempo and a prominent horn section. The track was featured in The X-Files: The Album, a promotional soundtrack album released to accompany the film The X-Files: Fight The Future.

== Composition ==
"Invisible Sun" is composed in the key of E-flat major/C minor with the verses alternating between these keys. The verses give off an ominous and desperate feeling. The chorus is in G major and is heavier and more bombastic.

== Track listings ==
7-inch: A&M / AMS 8164 (UK)

1. "Invisible Sun" – 3:35
2. "Shambelle" – 5:42

7-inch: A&M / AMS 8164 (NL)

1. "Invisible Sun" – 3:35
2. "Flexible Strategies" – 3:42

== Personnel ==
- Sting – bass guitar, keyboards, lead and backing vocals
- Andy Summers – guitars, effects
- Stewart Copeland – drums

== Charts ==
Chart (1981–1982)	Peak position
Australia (Kent Music Report)	89
Ireland (IRMA)	5
Netherlands (Single Top 100)	27
UK Singles (Official Charts)	2

== Certifications ==
Region	Certification	Certified units/sales
United Kingdom (BPI)	Silver	250,000^{^}
^{^} Shipments figures based on certification alone.

== See also ==
- List of songs banned by the BBC
- List of anti-war songs
