= The Police (album) =

2007 compilation album by the Police

Compilation album by the Police
- Released: 11 June 2007
- Recorded: February 1977 – February 1983
- Genres: New wave; punk rock; rock
- Length: 118:41
- Label: A&M
- Producers: The Police; Nigel Gray; Hugh Padgham

The Police chronology
The Very Best of Sting & The Police (2002)	The Police (2007)	Certifiable: Live in Buenos Aires (2008)

Professional ratings
Review scores
Source	Rating
AllMusic	4.5/5 stars
Rolling Stone	4/5 stars

The Police is a self-titled compilation album released by the Police on 11 June 2007, to both celebrate the 30th anniversary of their recording debut and accompany their reunion tour. It contains 28 tracks over two discs, a mixture of hit singles and fan favourites. All the singles are included, with the exception of "Secret Journey" and '"Don't Stand So Close to Me '86" (though the original version of the latter from the album Zenyatta Mondatta is included). International editions contain two bonus tracks, "The Bed's Too Big Without You" from Reggatta de Blanc (which was originally released as a single as part of the Six Pack seven-inch singles collection in 1980) and "Rehumanize Yourself" from Ghost in the Machine. The band's non-studio album debut single, "Fall Out", originally recorded in 1977 (with the band's first guitarist Henry Padovani), is also included; other than Message in a Box: The Complete Recordings (1993) the song has never been included on any other Police album.

The Police debuted at number 11 on the U.S. Billboard 200 albums chart, selling approximately 58,000 copies in its first week.

== Track listing ==
All tracks are written by Sting except where noted.

Disc one
No.	Title	Writer(s)	Origin	Length
1.	"Fall Out"	Stewart Copeland	Non-album single, 1977	2:03
2.	"Can't Stand Losing You"		Outlandos d'Amour, 1978	2:58
3.	"Next to You"		Outlandos d'Amour	2:50
4.	"Roxanne"		Outlandos d'Amour	3:12
5.	"Truth Hits Everybody"		Outlandos d'Amour	2:55
6.	"Hole in My Life"		Outlandos d'Amour	4:49
7.	"So Lonely"		Outlandos d'Amour	4:49
8.	"Message in a Bottle"		Reggatta de Blanc, 1979	4:49
9.	"Reggatta de Blanc"	Copeland, Sting, Andy Summers	Reggatta de Blanc	3:14
10.	"Bring On the Night"		Reggatta de Blanc	4:16
11.	"Walking on the Moon"		Reggatta de Blanc	4:59
12.	"The Bed's Too Big Without You" (^{[*]})		Reggatta de Blanc	4:25
13.	"Don't Stand So Close to Me"		Zenyatta Mondatta, 1980	4:03
14.	"Driven to Tears"		Zenyatta Mondatta	3:21
15.	"Canary in a Coalmine"		Zenyatta Mondatta	2:27
Total length:				55:10

Disc two
No.	Title	Writer(s)	Origin	Length
1.	"De Do Do Do, De Da Da Da"		Zenyatta Mondatta	4:10
2.	"Voices Inside My Head"		Zenyatta Mondatta	3:53
3.	"Invisible Sun"		Ghost in the Machine, 1981	3:44
4.	"Every Little Thing She Does Is Magic"		Ghost in the Machine	4:20
5.	"Spirits in the Material World"		Ghost in the Machine	2:58
6.	"Demolition Man"		Ghost in the Machine	5:55
7.	"Rehumanize Yourself" (^{[*]})	Copeland, Sting	Ghost in the Machine	3:10
8.	"Every Breath You Take"		Synchronicity, 1983	4:14
9.	"Synchronicity I"		Synchronicity	3:22
10.	"Wrapped Around Your Finger"		Synchronicity	5:13
11.	"Walking in Your Footsteps"		Synchronicity	3:36
12.	"Synchronicity II"		Synchronicity	5:05
13.	"King of Pain"		Synchronicity	4:59
14.	"Murder by Numbers"	Sting, Summers	B-side of "Every Breath You Take", 1983; Synchronicity (cassette and CD versions)	4:33
15.	"Tea in the Sahara"		Synchronicity	4:19
Total length:				63:31 (118:41)

- * Bonus tracks on UK edition.

== Personnel ==
- Stewart Copeland – drums, percussion, synthesizer, rhythm guitar on "Fall Out", backing vocals
- Sting – bass guitar, lead and backing vocals, oboe, saxophone, synthesizer, drum machine on "Synchronicity I"
- Andy Summers – guitar, synthesizer, piano, backing vocals (except on "Fall Out")
- Henry Padovani – guitar solo on "Fall Out"
- John Sinclair – piano on "Hole in My Life"
- Jean Roussel – piano on "Every Little Thing She Does Is Magic"

== Charts ==
=== Weekly charts ===
Chart (2007)	Peak position
Australian Albums (ARIA)	17
Austrian Albums (Ö3 Austria)	65
Belgian Albums (Ultratop Flanders)	2
Belgian Albums (Ultratop Wallonia)	16
Danish Albums (Hitlisten)	6
Dutch Albums (Album Top 100)	5
German Albums (Offizielle Top 100)	78
Hungarian Albums (MAHASZ)	20
Irish Albums (IRMA)	2
Italian Albums (FIMI)	26
New Zealand Albums (RMNZ)	4
Norwegian Albums (VG-lista)	8
Polish Albums (ZPAV)	16
Portuguese Albums (AFP)	11
Scottish Albums (Official Charts)	3
Spanish Albums (Promusicae)	20
Swedish Albums (Sverigetopplistan)	29
Swiss Albums (Schweizer Hitparade)	20
UK Albums (Official Charts)	3
US Billboard 200	11

=== Year-end charts ===
Chart (2007)	Position
Belgian Albums (Ultratop Flanders)	35
Belgian Albums (Ultratop Wallonia)	71
Dutch Albums (Album Top 100)	57
UK Albums (OCC)	74
US Billboard 200	176

== Certifications ==
Region	Certification	Certified units/sales
Belgium (BRMA)	Gold	15,000^{*}
Canada (Music Canada)	Gold	50,000^{^}
Ireland (IRMA)	2× Platinum	30,000^{^}
New Zealand (RMNZ)	Gold	7,500^{^}
Norway (IFPI Norway)	Gold	20,000^{*}
United Kingdom (BPI)	Platinum	300,000^{^}
^{*} Sales figures based on certification alone.^{^} Shipments figures based on certification alone.
