= Live! (The Police album) =

Live album by The Police
- Released: 30 May 1995
- Recorded: 27 November 1979 at the Orpheum Theatre (Boston, Massachusetts); 2–3 November 1983 at The Omni (Atlanta, Georgia)
- Genre: New wave
- Length: 144:07
- Label: A&M
- Producer: Andy Summers

The Police chronology
Every Breath You Take: The Classics (1995)	Live! (1995)	The Very Best of Sting & The Police (1997)

Singles from Live!
- 1. "Can't Stand Losing You" Released: 1 May 1995

Professional ratings
Review scores
Source	Rating
AllMusic	3/5 stars
Entertainment Weekly	B+
Rolling Stone	3/5 stars

Live! is a live album by the Police, released in 1995 on compact disc and cassette tape. It is the band's first live album and one of only two covering their initial period of activity before 1986, the other being Around the World (2022). A live album from the reunion tour, Certifiable: Live in Buenos Aires, was released in 2008.

== Contents ==
According to Andy Summers, the idea of releasing an album of live material by The Police went back as far as 1982. Up until that point, a few live tracks had only surfaced on B-sides and compilations such as Urgh! A Music War (1980). The plan was to have a new album of the band to act as a stopgap between Ghost in the Machine (1981) and Synchronicity (1983). The record was mixed and mastered in Canada but never released. Similar plans took place in 1984 at the tail of the band's Synchronicity tour, but the project was shelved again, this time in favour of a greatest hits album (Every Breath You Take: The Singles). In 1995, thanks to the technical possibilities and greater running time offered by the CD format, the idea regained momentum and Summers was invited to produce. The album features the band performing at two very distinct periods of its career. Disc one contains almost the complete concert on 27 November 1979 at the Orpheum Theatre in Boston, Massachusetts. It features mostly material from the first two albums, Outlandos d'Amour and Reggatta de Blanc, as well as songs only released as singles or B-sides such as "Fall Out" and "Landlord". The performance was broadcast by the WBCN (FM) radio in Boston. Disc two contains excerpts from two concerts on 2–3 November 1983 in Atlanta, Georgia at The Omni during the Synchronicity tour for the album of the same name. On this occasion the band was augmented by three backing vocalists. Both shows were widely known to fans as they had been circulating in bootleg format for many years. The 1983 shows were also featured in the 1984 Synchronicity Concert VHS and the 2005 DVD release, and a live version of "Tea in the Sahara" had been released as the B-side of "King of Pain" in 1984.

Live! contributed to refresh the popularity of The Police about a decade after their break-up. It also had the merit of showcasing the band's live activity, and their propensity for rearranging and extending known songs such as "Roxanne" and "Walking on the Moon". An edited version of "Can't Stand Losing You" from the Boston performance was released as a single and reached number 27 in the UK charts, while the album itself reached number 25.

== Reception ==
Live! was generally well received. David Sinclair in Q magazine noted how the album added an important dimension to the band's recorded legacy by offering a reminder of why The Police were one of the great performing acts of their day. Paul Colbert from Encore Magazine wrote: "It may have taken 10 years for a live album to materialise, but these two CDs were worth the wait, capturing two essential periods, two indispensable sets of material". Andrew Abrahams emphasised the difference between the two performances, observing how the one in Boston "captures a hungry rock band on its ascent" while the one in Atlanta "is more predictable, revealing a super-group that has settled into fame and commercial acceptability". In a November 1993 interview with Q magazine, Sting seemed to agree on this point: "I remember those small gigs so much better than the stadium shows. I can remember pretty well every night of the first tour: which gigs had tricky stairs to negotiate with the gear; what was said in the dressing room; which encores we did. But a stadium just looks like a stadium".

== Track listing ==
All songs written by Sting, except where noted.

=== Disc one (1979 – Orpheum WBCN/Live in Boston) ===
No.	Title	Writer(s)	Length
1.	"Next to You"		2:57
2.	"So Lonely"		7:32
3.	"Truth Hits Everybody"		2:34
4.	"Walking on the Moon"		4:59
5.	"Hole in My Life"		4:08
6.	"Fall Out"	Stewart Copeland	2:46
7.	"Bring On the Night"		5:16
8.	"Message in a Bottle"		4:27
9.	"The Bed's Too Big Without You"		8:53
10.	"Peanuts"	Sting, Copeland	3:07
11.	"Roxanne"		4:42
12.	"Can't Stand Losing You"/"Reggatta de Blanc"	Sting/Sting, Copeland, Andy Summers	7:54
13.	"Landlord"	Sting, Copeland	2:27
14.	"Born in the 50s"		4:18
15.	"Be My Girl – Sally"	Sting, Summers	4:51

=== Disc two (1983 – Synchronicity Concert/Live in Atlanta) ===
No.	Title	Writer(s)	Length
1.	"Synchronicity I"		2:52
2.	"Synchronicity II"		4:44
3.	"Walking in Your Footsteps"		4:54
4.	"Message in a Bottle"		4:35
5.	"O My God"		3:36
6.	"De Do Do Do, De Da Da Da"		4:32
7.	"Wrapped Around Your Finger"		5:21
8.	"Tea in the Sahara"		4:52
9.	"Spirits in the Material World"		2:57
10.	"King of Pain"		5:53
11.	"Don't Stand So Close to Me"		3:36
12.	"Every Breath You Take"		4:37
13.	"Roxanne"		6:10
14.	"Can't Stand Losing You"/"Reggatta de Blanc"	Sting/Sting, Copeland, Summers	6:48
15.	"So Lonely"		7:26

For Record Store Day, 12 June 2021, discs one and two were released separately as Live! Vol. 1: Boston 1979 and Live! Vol. 2: Atlanta 1983 on double LP blue and red colored vinyl, respectively.

== Personnel ==
The Police

- Sting – lead vocals, bass, synthesizers, Taurus pedals, pan flute, oboe
- Andy Summers – guitar, synthesizers, Taurus pedals, backing vocals, lead vocals on "Be My Girl – Sally"
- Stewart Copeland – drums, percussion, xylophone, backing vocals

Additional personnel (disc two only)

- Michelle Cobb – backing vocals
- Dolette McDonald – backing vocals
- Tessa Niles – backing vocals

=== Production ===
- Producer: Andy Summers
- Executive producers: The Police and Miles Copeland III
- Engineers: Wolfgang Amadeus and Eddie King
- Assistant engineer: Jun Murakawa
- Photography: Lynn Goldsmith and Jill Furmanovsky
- Art direction and design: Norman Moore

== Charts ==
Chart performance for Live!
Chart (1995)	Peak position
Australian Albums (ARIA)	100
Belgian Albums (Ultratop Flanders)	41
Belgian Albums (Ultratop Wallonia)	25
Canada Top Albums/CDs (RPM)	57
Dutch Albums (Album Top 100)	17
German Albums (Offizielle Top 100)	43
New Zealand Albums (RMNZ)	36
Scottish Albums (Official Charts)	39
UK Albums (Official Charts)	25
US Billboard 200	86

== Certifications ==
Certifications for Live!
Region	Certification	Certified units/sales
Spain (Promusicae)	Gold	50,000^{^}
United States (RIAA)	Platinum	1,000,000^{^}
^{^} Shipments figures based on certification alone.
