= The Bed's Too Big Without You =

1980 single by the Police

Single by the Police

from the album Reggatta de Blanc
- B-side: "Truth Hits Everybody" (live)
- Released: 30 May 1980
- Genre: Reggae; new wave
- Length: 4:26
- Label: A&M (AAMPP 6001/E)
- Songwriter: Sting
- Producers: Nigel Gray; the Police

The Police singles chronology
"Bring on the Night" (1979)	"The Bed's Too Big Without You" (1980)	"Don't Stand So Close to Me" (1980)

Vinyl 45

Audio
- "The Bed's Too Big Without You" on YouTube

"The Bed's Too Big Without You" is a song by British rock band the Police, released as the final single from their second studio album Reggatta de Blanc (1979). It was written by lead vocalist and bassist Sting. An alternate version was released as a single in the UK in 1980 in the set Six Pack in conjunction with the re-release of the Police's earlier singles "Roxanne", "Can't Stand Losing You", "So Lonely", "Message in a Bottle" and "Walking on the Moon".

It has been covered by a number of other artists, including Sting as a solo artist, Ranking Roger and Sheila Hylton.

== Background ==
The themes of the song are loneliness and the pain of the end of a relationship. According to Chris Campion, the lyrics were inspired by an incident in which Sting's first girlfriend, after being heartbroken upon their break-up, committed suicide.

"The Bed's Too Big Without You" was first released on Reggatta de Blanc in 1979. However, the following year, the song saw a single release as a bonus single in the Six Pack box set, which featured the band's five previous British singles (excluding "Fall Out"). Said box set peaked at No. 17 in Britain. The song was also released as the B-side to "So Lonely" in Germany.

A promo video for "The Bed's Too Big Without You" was performed by the band on The Kenny Everett Video Show. It featured the band members miming to the song in a suburban house.

"The Bed's Too Big Without You" was included on a number of Police compilation and live albums. The original album version was included on Greatest Hits and the UK deluxe version of The Police, while the alternate mono version was included on Message in a Box: The Complete Recordings. A live version is included on Live!.

=== Reception ===
AllMusic critic Chris True regards "The Bed's Too Big Without You" as a classic example of the Police's ability to merge reggae with new wave music. He also praises the musicianship of all three members of the band, Stewart Copeland's "brilliant" drumming, Andy Summers' "trebly" guitar playing and Sting's "rolling" bass line. He notes that the song never gets boring, even when only the drums and bass are playing. Ultimate Classic Rock critic Mike Duquette also praised Copeland’s "off-kilter backbeat." Authors Chris Welch and Ken Micallef and Donnie Marshall also praise Copeland's drumming, particularly on the snare drum. Micallef and Marshall specifically describe Copeland's snare drum rhythms as "ricocheting" and "dub-heavy".

Welch regards "The Bed's Too Big Without You" as the third great hit from Reggatta de Blanc, along with "Message in a Bottle" and "Walking on the Moon", particularly praising the fact that it is "a simple phrase, a neat concept". Welch also praises the alternate version, which appears on the box set Message in a Box, for having an even "more direct impact". AllMusic critic Greg Prato considers it an "early fave" of the Police. Mojo critic John Harris regards the song as "stereotypically Police-esque" to the point of appearing to be a self-parody. Rolling Stone critic Debra Rae Cohen described it as "an evocative reggae track", particularly praising Sting's vocals and Summers' guitar. While NME critic Tony Stewart considered it to be "a lame expression of remorse", author Martin Charles Strong describes it as a "melodic lament" and an example of the Police "charting new musical territory". Police guitarist Andy Summers regards it as a great song, along with "Message in a Bottle", "Bring on the Night", and "Walking on the Moon" from the Reggatta de Blanc album.

== Track listing ==
7-inch – A&M / AMPP 6001/E (UK)

1. "The Bed's Too Big Without You" – 3:30
2. "Truth Hits Everybody" (live) – 2:27

7-inch – A&M / AMRS 1318 (Zimbabwe)

1. "The Bed's Too Big Without You" – 4:24
2. "Bring on the Night" – 4:16

== Personnel ==
- Sting – bass guitar, vocals
- Andy Summers – guitar
- Stewart Copeland – drums
