= The Very Best of Sting & The Police =

The Very Best of... Sting & The Police

Greatest hits album by Sting and the Police
- Released: 10 November 1997 (original); 18 February 2002 (update)
- Genres: New wave, rock
- Length: 63:03
- Label: A&M
- Producers: Hugh Padgham, Sean "Puffy" Combs

Sting chronology
Mercury Falling (1996)	The Very Best of... Sting & The Police (1997)	Brand New Day (1999)

The Police chronology
Live! (1995)	The Very Best of... Sting & The Police (1997)	The Police (2007)

2002 updated edition
- The Very Best of.... Sting & The Police (2002)

Professional ratings
Review scores
Source	Rating
AllMusic	4/5 stars
Rolling Stone	4/5 stars
Uncut	3/5 stars

The Very Best of... Sting & The Police is a compilation album issued by A&M Records on 10 November 1997, containing a mix of Police songs and Sting's solo works. It originally featured one new track, a remix of the 1978 song "Roxanne" by rap artist Sean "Puffy" Combs. The album was reissued in 1998 by PolyGram International with "Russians" removed and three added tracks: "Seven Days", "Fragile", and "De Do Do Do, De Da Da Da". The original European version issued by A&M Records of this compilation instead included these tracks without removing "Russians".

In 2002, an updated edition was released by Universal with several track changes: the songs "Let Your Soul Be Your Pilot", "Russians", and "Roxanne '97 (Puff Daddy Remix)" are omitted, with the songs "Brand New Day", "Desert Rose", and "So Lonely" in their place. "Brand New Day" and "Desert Rose" were recorded after the original 1997 Very Best Of, being from the 1999 album Brand New Day.

== Track listing ==
=== A&M (1997) ===
All tracks are written by Sting, except where noted.

No.	Title	Writer(s)	Album	Length
1.	"Message in a Bottle"		Reggatta de Blanc (1979)	4:49
2.	"Can't Stand Losing You"		Outlandos d'Amour (1978)	2:58
3.	"Englishman in New York"		...Nothing Like the Sun (1987)	4:25
4.	"Every Breath You Take"		Synchronicity (1983)	4:13
5.	"Walking on the Moon"		Reggatta de Blanc	4:59
6.	"Fields of Gold"		Ten Summoner's Tales (1993)	3:40
7.	"Every Little Thing She Does Is Magic"		Ghost in the Machine (1981)	4:20
8.	"If You Love Somebody Set Them Free"		The Dream of the Blue Turtles (1985)	4:14
9.	"Let Your Soul Be Your Pilot" (edit)		Mercury Falling (1996)	4:29
10.	"Russians"	Sting; Sergei Prokofiev	The Dream of the Blue Turtles	3:57
11.	"If I Ever Lose My Faith in You"		Ten Summoner's Tales	4:29
12.	"When We Dance" (edit)		Fields of Gold: The Best of Sting 1984–1994 (1994)	4:17
13.	"Don't Stand So Close to Me"		Zenyatta Mondatta (1980)	4:03
14.	"Roxanne"		Outlandos d'Amour	3:12
15.	"Roxanne '97" (Puff Daddy Remix)		Previously unreleased	4:33
Total length:				63:03

=== PolyGram International (1998) ===
No.	Title	Album	Length
1.	"Message in a Bottle"	Reggatta de Blanc	4:49
2.	"Can't Stand Losing You"	Outlandos d'Amour	2:58
3.	"Englishman in New York"	...Nothing Like the Sun	4:25
4.	"Every Breath You Take"	Synchronicity	4:13
5.	"Seven Days"	Ten Summoner's Tales	4:39
6.	"Walking on the Moon"	Reggatta de Blanc	4:59
7.	"Fields of Gold"	Ten Summoner's Tales	3:40
8.	"Fragile"	...Nothing Like the Sun	3:54
9.	"Every Little Thing She Does Is Magic"	Ghost in the Machine	4:20
10.	"De Do Do Do, De Da Da Da"	Zenyatta Mondatta	4:09
11.	"If You Love Somebody Set Them Free"	The Dream of the Blue Turtles	4:14
12.	"Let Your Soul Be Your Pilot" (edit)	Mercury Falling	4:29
13.	"If I Ever Lose My Faith in You"	Ten Summoner's Tales	4:29
14.	"When We Dance" (edit)	Fields of Gold: The Best of Sting 1984–1994	4:17
15.	"Don't Stand So Close to Me"	Zenyatta Mondatta	4:03
16.	"Roxanne"	Outlandos d'Amour	3:12
17.	"Roxanne '97" (Puff Daddy Remix)	Previously unreleased	4:33
Total length:			75:47

An Australian Edition, also published by PolyGram, places in "Russians" as Track 13, boosting the total to 18 Tracks.

Japanese edition bonus track
No.	Title	Writer(s)	Album	Length
18.	"De Do Do Do, De Da Da Da" (Japanese version)	Sting; Reiko Yukawa	"De Do Do Do, De Da Da Da" Japanese single	4:00
Total length:				79:47

=== Universal (2002) ===
No.	Title	Writer(s)	Album	Length
1.	"Message in a Bottle"		Reggatta de Blanc	4:50
2.	"Can't Stand Losing You"		Outlandos d'Amour	3:00
3.	"Englishman in New York"		...Nothing Like the Sun	4:28
4.	"Every Breath You Take"		Synchronicity	4:12
5.	"Seven Days"		Ten Summoner's Tales	4:39
6.	"Walking on the Moon"		Reggatta de Blanc	4:59
7.	"Fields of Gold"		Ten Summoner's Tales	3:40
8.	"Fragile"		...Nothing Like the Sun	3:54
9.	"Every Little Thing She Does Is Magic"		Ghost in the Machine	4:20
10.	"De Do Do Do, De Da Da Da"		Zenyatta Mondatta	4:09
11.	"If You Love Somebody Set Them Free"		The Dream of the Blue Turtles	4:14
12.	"Brand New Day"		Brand New Day (1999)	6:22
13.	"Desert Rose" (featuring Cheb Mami)	Sting; Cheb Rabah	Brand New Day	4:47
14.	"If I Ever Lose My Faith in You"		Ten Summoner's Tales	4:30
15.	"When We Dance"		Fields of Gold: The Best of Sting 1984–1994	4:18
16.	"Don't Stand So Close to Me"		Zenyatta Mondatta	4:00
17.	"Roxanne"		Outlandos d'Amour	3:10
18.	"So Lonely"		Outlandos d'Amour	4:47
Total length:				78:34

== Additional personnel ==
"Roxanne '97" (Puff Daddy Remix)

- Pras – rap vocals
- Full Force – background vocals

=== Production ===
- Dave Collins – mastering

== Charts ==
=== Weekly charts ===
Weekly chart performance for The Very Best of Sting & The Police
Chart (1997–98)	Peak position
Australian Albums (ARIA)	22
Austrian Albums (Ö3 Austria)	4
Belgian Albums (Ultratop Flanders)	8
Belgian Albums (Ultratop Wallonia)	14
Dutch Albums (Album Top 100)	17
Finnish Albums (Suomen virallinen lista)	8
German Albums (Offizielle Top 100)	18
Hungarian Albums (MAHASZ)	32
Italian Albums (FIMI)	9
New Zealand Albums (RMNZ)	5
Swedish Albums (Sverigetopplistan)	26
Swiss Albums (Schweizer Hitparade)	17
UK Albums (OCC)	11

Weekly chart performance for 2002 updated edition of The Very Best of Sting & The Police
Chart (2002)	Peak position
Danish Albums (Hitlisten)	4
Dutch Albums (Album Top 100)	69
German Albums (Offizielle Top 100)	59
Irish Albums (IRMA)	4
Italian Albums (FIMI)	4
Italian Albums (Musica e dischi)	5
New Zealand Albums (Recorded Music NZ)	17
UK Albums (Official Charts)	1
US Billboard 200	46

Chart (2008)	Peak position
Spanish Albums (Promusicae)	60

=== Year-end charts ===
1997 year-end chart performance for The Very Best of Sting & The Police
Chart (1997)	Position
Australian Albums (ARIA)	78
Belgian Albums (Ultratop Flanders)	51
Belgian Albums (Ultratop Wallonia)	61
UK Albums (OCC)	45

1998 year-end chart performance for The Very Best of Sting & The Police
Chart (1998)	Position
Austrian Albums (Ö3 Austria)	40
Belgian Albums (Ultratop Wallonia)	70
Dutch Albums (Album Top 100)	100
UK Albums (OCC)	100

2002 year-end chart performance for The Very Best of Sting & The Police
Chart (2002)	Position
UK Albums (OCC)	44

== Certifications ==
Certifications and sales for The Very Best of Sting & The Police
Region	Certification	Certified units/sales
Argentina (CAPIF)	Platinum	60,000^{^}
Australia (ARIA)	Gold	35,000^{^}
Austria (IFPI Austria)	Gold	25,000^{*}
Belgium (BRMA)	Platinum	50,000^{*}
France (SNEP)	2× Gold	200,000^{*}
Germany (BVMI)	Gold	250,000^{^}
Hong Kong (IFPI Hong Kong)	Gold	10,000^{*}
Italy (FIMI)	Gold	30,000^{*}
Japan (RIAJ)	Gold	100,000^{^}
New Zealand (RMNZ)	Gold	7,500^{^}
Spain (Promusicae)	Gold	50,000^{^}
Switzerland (IFPI Switzerland)	Gold	25,000^{^}
United Kingdom (BPI)	5× Platinum	1,500,000^{‡}
United States (RIAA)	Gold	500,000^{^}
^{*} Sales figures based on certification alone.^{^} Shipments figures based on certification alone.^{‡} Sales+streaming figures based on certification alone.
