= Bring On the Night (song) =

1979 single by the Police

"Bring on the Night"

Single by the Police

from the album Reggatta de Blanc
- B-side: "Visions of the Night"
- Released: January 1980 (US)
- Recorded: 1979
- Genre: Reggae rock; new wave
- Length: 4:15
- Label: A&M – 2218-S
- Songwriter: Sting
- Producers: Nigel Gray; the Police

The Police singles chronology
"Walking on the Moon" (1979)	"Bring on the Night" (1980)	"The Bed's Too Big Without You" (1980)

Alternate cover
- German cover

Audio
- "Bring On the Night" on YouTube

"Bring on the Night" is a song by British rock band the Police. Written by the band's bassist and vocalist Sting, the song appeared as the fourth track on the band's second studio album, Reggatta de Blanc (1979).

== Background ==
Some of the lyrics of "Bring on the Night" were recycled from the song "Carrion Prince (O Ye of Little Hope)", which was written by Sting for the band Last Exit. The title "Carrion Prince (O Ye of Little Hope)" was taken from Ted Hughes's poem "King of Carrion," which is about Pontius Pilate. However, after reading The Executioner's Song, Sting felt that the words fitted Gary Gilmore's death wish, and says that since then, "I sing it with him in mind."

Another line from "Bring on the Night", "when the evening spreads itself against the sky," is taken from T. S. Eliot's poem "The Love Song of J. Alfred Prufrock," written in 1910-15. In Lyrics By Sting, Sting said of this, "What is it Eliot said? 'Bad poets borrow, good poets steal'?"

The song was only released as an album track in Britain, but was released as a single in the United States, Germany and France in January 1980. It was backed with "Visions of the Night" (the British B-side to "Walking on the Moon") in the United States, with "Reggatta de Blanc" in Germany, and with "Roxanne" in France. The single managed to hit No. 6 in France; however the song did not make it into the charts in the US and Germany. The song was also released in a compilation album The Police, as well as in live form on the album Live!, and featured as the title track on Sting’s live solo album Bring On the Night which included extended jazz-influenced arrangements of Police songs, in addition to solo originals.

=== Critical reception ===
Cash Box said that "a charming acoustic guitar melody blends easily with the big kick drum beat and bassist." Record World said that "Captivating soprano vocals join a pulsating guitar and thumping drum as the Police issue more of their premium reggae rock." Greg Prato of AllMusic noted the song as being "much more sedate than [some songs on Outlandos d'Amour]." AllMusic critic Stephen Thomas Erlewine, in his review of The Police, noted the song as a "second-tier classic." Ultimate Classic Rock critic Mike Duquette rated it to be the Police's 11th greatest song, saying that Andy Summers' "arpeggiated guitar riff...is one of the band’s catchiest."

== Track listing ==
7" – A&M / AM 2218-S (US)

1. "Bring on the Night" – 4:15
2. "Visions of the Night" – 3:05

7" – A&M / AMS 7689 (Germany)

1. "Bring on the Night" – 4:15
2. "Reggatta de Blanc" – 3:05

7" – A&M / AMS 7687 (France)

1. "Bring on the Night" – 4:15
2. "Roxanne" – 3:10

== Personnel ==
- Sting – vocals, bass guitar
- Andy Summers – guitar
- Stewart Copeland – drums

== Charts ==
Chart (October 1983)	Peak position
France	6
