= Six Pack (The Police box set) =

1980 box set by The Police

Box set by the Police
- Released: 30 May 1980
- Recorded: 1978–1979
- Genre: New wave
- Label: A&M
- Producers: Nigel Gray; Stewart Copeland; Gordon Sumner; Andy Summers

The Police chronology
Reggatta de Blanc (1979)	Six Pack (1980)	Zenyatta Mondatta (1980)

Retrospective professional ratings
Review scores
Source	Rating
Record Mirror	10/10

Six Pack is a collection of seven-inch singles — both A-sides and B-sides — released by the English rock band the Police between 1978 and mid-1980.

The pack, which comes in a PVC folder, contains the first five A&M singles by the band, namely "Roxanne", "Can't Stand Losing You", "So Lonely", "Message in a Bottle" and "Walking on the Moon", plus a mono version of "The Bed's Too Big Without You", which was previously unreleased. This latter song was chosen for promotional purposes for TV and radio airplay, and was often regarded as the group's latest single upon release of the set.

The records in the pack were all produced on blue vinyl with specially adapted labels which feature an overhead picture of the heads of the band originally used on the back cover of the Reggatta de Blanc LP, rather than the original "A&M" logo. Each single is accompanied by a special picture card (3 group shots and 3 solo shots), with the lyrics of each single printed on the reverse.

The release reached number 17 in the UK Singles Chart in June 1980. Due to changes in chart rules, this set would have been classified as an album after 1983, when Gallup took over compilation of the chart and a Michael Jackson singles pack became the first set of 7-inch singles to chart as an album.

The chart classification of the release caused the British Market Research Bureau (BMRB) – compilers of the official chart – frustration. As Record Mirror reported just after its release, "If they do just decide it is one single it could become the most expensive single ever to chart", a comment they echoed in their review of the set, saying it would become the most expensive ever charting single "by about £3". A BMRB spokesperson said before their final decision: "We're still trying to decide what to do if it does sell in significant quantities. The decision will be a conceptual one, and nothing to do with the price, as to which chart we could place it in", adding that they were undecided whether to include it in any chart.

== Track listing ==
All tracks are written by Sting, except where noted.

No.	Title	Writer(s)	Length
1.	"Roxanne"		3:00
2.	"Peanuts"	Stewart Copeland; Sting	3:54
3.	"So Lonely"		3:10
4.	"No Time This Time"		3:20
5.	"Can't Stand Losing You"		2:58
6.	"Dead End Job"	Copeland; Sting; Andy Summers	3:30
7.	"Message in a Bottle"		3:50
8.	"Landlord"	Copeland; Sting	3:09
9.	"Walking on the Moon"		3:59
10.	"Visions of the Night"		3:05
11.	"The Bed's Too Big Without You"		3:30
12.	"Truth Hits Everybody"		2:26

== Credits ==
- Sting – Lead vocals, bass
- Andy Summers – Guitar, backing vocals, piano and spoken word newspaper reading on "Dead End Job"
- Stewart Copeland – Drums, percussions, backing vocals
