= Reggatta de Blanc =

Studio album by the Police
- Released: 5 October 1979
- Recorded: 1978 ("No Time This Time"); February–August 1979
- Studio: Surrey Sound (Leatherhead)
- Genres: New wave; reggae rock; post-punk
- Length: 41:52
- Label: A&M
- Producers: Nigel Gray; The Police

The Police chronology
| Outlandos d'Amour (1978) | Reggatta de Blanc (1979) | Six Pack (1980) |

Singles from Reggatta de Blanc
- 1. "Message in a Bottle" Released: 14 September 1979; 2. "Walking on the Moon" Released: 23 November 1979; 3. "Bring On the Night" Released: January 1980 (US); 4. "The Bed's Too Big Without You" Released: 30 May 1980 (UK) (Note: released as part of the "Six Pack" singles set)

Reggatta de Blanc is the second studio album by the English rock band the Police, released on 5 October 1979 by A&M Records. It was the band's first release to top the UK Albums Chart and features their first two UK number-one singles: "Message in a Bottle" and "Walking on the Moon". In early 1980, the album was reissued in the United States on two 10-inch discs, one album side per disc, and as a collector's edition with a poster of the band.

The album's title loosely translates in French to "White Reggae". It was the band's second album to bear a Franglais title, after their 1978 debut album Outlandos d'Amour. Reggatta de Blanc proved more popular and successful than its predecessor. The title track earned the band their first Grammy Award for Best Rock Instrumental Performance.

In 2003, Reggatta de Blanc was ranked at number 369 on Rolling Stone magazine's list of the 500 greatest albums of all time.

== Background ==
Reggatta de Blanc took four weeks to record, spaced over several months. Unlike its successor, Zenyatta Mondatta, there was no pressure on the band. Of the sessions, drummer Stewart Copeland said, "We just went into the studio and said, 'Right, who's got the first song?' We hadn't even rehearsed them before we went in."

Against the wishes of A&M Records, who had wanted to equip the promising band with a bigger studio and more famous producer, the Police opted to again record at Surrey Sound with Nigel Gray. The small budget (between £6,000 and £9,000) was easily covered by the profits of their previous album, Outlandos d'Amour, further ensuring that the record label would have no control over the actual creation of the band's music.

Whereas Outlandos d'Amour had benefited from one of the most prolific songwriting periods of Sting's life, the recording sessions for Reggatta de Blanc were so short on new material that the band even considered re-recording "Fall Out" at one point. To fill in the gaps, Sting and Copeland dug up old songs they had written and used elements of them to create new songs. Much of the lyrics to "Bring On the Night" were recycled from Sting's Last Exit song "Carrion Prince (O Ye of Little Hope)" and "The Bed's Too Big Without You" similarly started as a Last Exit tune, while "Does Everyone Stare" originates from a piano piece Copeland wrote in college. The closing track "No Time This Time" was previously the B-side to "So Lonely" in November 1978, and was added to pad out the album's running time.

== Music and lyrics ==
As on the band's first album, Reggatta de Blanc features the Police's original fusion of hard rock, British pop, reggae, and new wave music. The instrumental "Reggatta de Blanc", one of the few songs written by the Police as a group, was developed from an extended instrumental piece that the band would typically work into their live performances of "Can't Stand Losing You". "Bring On the Night" was written three years earlier as "Carrion Prince", the title taken from Ted Hughes's poem "King of Carrion", and is about Pontius Pilate; however, after reading The Executioner's Song, Sting felt that the words fitted Gary Gilmore's death wish, and says that since then, "I sing it with him in mind." "The Bed's Too Big Without You" was covered by reggae singer Sheila Hylton in 1981, and became a UK Top 40 hit.

== Reception and legacy ==
Retrospective professional ratings
Review scores
| Source | Rating |
|---|---|
| AllMusic | 3/5 stars |
| Chicago Tribune | 2.5/4 stars |
| Christgau's Record Guide | B− |
| The Encyclopedia of Popular Music | 4/5 stars |
| The Great Rock Discography | 7/10 |
| MusicHound Rock: The Essential Album Guide | 4/5 stars |
| The Rolling Stone Album Guide | 4/5 stars |
| The Sacramento Bee | 3/4 stars |
| Spin Alternative Record Guide | 7/10 |
| Uncut | 5/5 stars |

Reggatta de Blanc continued to build on the success of Outlandos d'Amour, hitting number one on the British, Australian, and Dutch album charts upon its release in October 1979. "Message in a Bottle" and "Walking on the Moon" were released as singles and both reached number one in the UK, the band's first singles to do so. According to rock journalist Tim Peacock, with its success, the album transformed the Police "into one of the post-punk era's defining bands".

The album was met with positive reviews from magazines such as Smash Hits, People, and Rolling Stone. Writing for the latter in December 1979, Debra Rae Cohen said that objections to the band's stylistic appropriations of new wave and reggae are "rendered moot by the sheer energy of the band's rhythmic counter-punching". In The Village Voice's year-end Pazz & Jop poll of American critics nationwide, Reggatta de Blanc was voted the 35th best album of 1979. Robert Christgau, the poll's creator and the Voice's chief critic, was lukewarm about the album in Christgau's Record Guide: Rock Albums of the Seventies (1981): "The idea is to fuse Sting's ringing rock voice and the trio's aggressive, hard-edged rock attack with a less eccentric version of reggae's groove and a saner version of reggae's mix. To me the result sounds half-assed. And though I suppose I might find the 'synthesis' innovative if I heard as much reggae as they do in England, it's more likely I'd find it infuriating." In 1981, the album's title track earned the band a Grammy Award for Best Rock Instrumental Performance. In a retrospective review for AllMusic, Greg Prato said that the band's intense touring schedule leading up to the album had made their unique reggae rock fusion sharper, leading to a work that was "much more polished production-wise and fully developed from a songwriting standpoint", but also "more sedate" than their first album.

Reggatta de Blanc has appeared on professional listings of the greatest albums. In 2003, Rolling Stone ranked the record at number 369 on its list of the 500 greatest albums of all time; on an updated version of the list published in 2012, it placed at number 372. In 2006, it was included in the book 1001 Albums You Must Hear Before You Die. In 2014, Spin cited it as one of the major moments in the history of white reggae. In an interview with Modern Drummer, Stewart Copeland named it his favourite Police album.

== Track listing ==
Side one
| No. | Title | Writer(s) | Length |
|---|---|---|---|
| 1. | "Message in a Bottle" | Sting | 4:51 |
| 2. | "Reggatta de Blanc" (instrumental; scat vocals by Sting) | Sting; Andy Summers; Stewart Copeland | 3:06 |
| 3. | "It's Alright for You" | Sting; Copeland | 3:13 |
| 4. | "Bring On the Night" | Sting | 4:15 |
| 5. | "Deathwish" | Sting; Summers; Copeland | 4:13 |

Side two
| No. | Title | Writer(s) | Length |
|---|---|---|---|
| 6. | "Walking on the Moon" | Sting | 5:02 |
| 7. | "On Any Other Day" | Copeland | 2:57 |
| 8. | "The Bed's Too Big Without You" | Sting | 4:26 |
| 9. | "Contact" | Copeland | 2:38 |
| 10. | "Does Everyone Stare" | Copeland | 3:52 |
| 11. | "No Time This Time" | Sting | 3:17 |
| Total length: | | | 41:52 |

== Personnel ==
The album credits are printed as: "All noises by the Police. All arrangements by the Police."

==== The Police ====
- Sting – bass, vocals
- Andy Summers – guitar, vocals, synthesizer, guitar synthesizer (6)
- Stewart Copeland – drums, vocals, rhythm guitar (3, 7), bass (3, 7), intro piano (10)

==== Technical ====
- Produced by The Police and Nigel Gray
- Engineered by Nigel Gray
- Art direction and design – Michael Ross
- Front cover photography – James Wedge
- Back cover photography – Janette Beckman

== Charts ==
=== Weekly charts ===
| Chart (1979–81) | Peak position |
|---|---|
| Australian Albums (Kent Music Report) | 1 |
| Canada Top Albums/CDs (RPM) | 3 |
| Dutch Albums (Album Top 100) | 1 |
| German Albums (Offizielle Top 100) | 16 |
| Italian Albums (Musica e dischi) | 7 |
| Japanese Albums (Oricon) | 16 |
| New Zealand Albums (RMNZ) | 4 |
| Norwegian Albums (VG-lista) | 32 |
| Portuguese Albums (AFP) | 1 |
| Swedish Albums (Sverigetopplistan) | 21 |
| UK Albums (Official Charts) | 1 |
| US Billboard 200 | 25 |

=== Year-end charts ===
| Chart (1979) | Position |
|---|---|
| Canada Top Albums/CDs (RPM) | 99 |
| Dutch Albums (Album Top 100) | 25 |

| Chart (1980) | Position |
|---|---|
| Australian Albums (Kent Music Report) | 10 |
| Canada Top Albums/CDs (RPM) | 12 |
| Dutch Albums (Album Top 100) | 7 |
| German Albums (Offizielle Top 100) | 15 |
| New Zealand Albums (RMNZ) | 27 |
| US Albums (Billboard 200) | 79 |

== Certifications and sales ==
| Region | Certification | Certified units/sales |
|---|---|---|
| Australia (ARIA) | Platinum | 50,000^{^} |
| Belgium (BRMA) | Gold | 25,000^{*} |
| Canada (Music Canada) | Platinum | 100,000^{^} |
| France (SNEP) | Platinum | 400,000^{*} |
| Germany (BVMI) | Gold | 250,000^{^} |
| Italy (FIMI) sales since 2009 | Gold | 25,000^{‡} |
| Netherlands (NVPI) | Platinum | 100,000^{^} |
| New Zealand (RMNZ) | Platinum | 15,000^{^} |
| Spain | — | 50,000 |
| United Kingdom (BPI) 1979 release | Platinum | ~1,000,000 |
| United Kingdom (BPI) 2003 release | Silver | 60,000^{^} |
| United States (RIAA) | Platinum | 1,000,000^{^} |
^{*} Sales figures based on certification alone.^{^} Shipments figures based on certification alone.^{‡} Sales+streaming figures based on certification alone.
