= Sheila Hylton =

British reggae singer (born 1956)

- Born: 1956 (age 68–69); London, England
- Genres: Reggae
- Occupation: Singer
- Years active: 1978–present
- Labels: Island Records

Sheila Hylton (born 1956) is a British reggae singer who spent most of her childhood in Kingston, Jamaica. She is best known for the singles "Breakfast in Bed" and "The Bed's Too Big Without You".

== Career ==
Born in London in 1956, Hylton was sent to live with her grandparents in Kingston at the age of 5.

Hylton's earliest exposure to music was through the record collection of her grandfather who was a jazz fan. As a young woman she listened to and absorbed the works of the greatest female jazz singers. Her earliest experience in the music industry was as a secretary at Total Sounds in Kingston, but started recording for Harry J while working as an air hostess for Air Jamaica, her first single, "Don't Ask My Neighbour", was a local hit, and she also released a cover of Ebony's "Life in the Country".

Island Records signed her to their Mango label. Hylton had her first major international success with a Harry J-produced cover of "Breakfast in Bed", which peaked at no. 57 on the UK Singles Chart in 1979. Hylton then recorded a version of The Police's "The Bed's Too Big Without You" which also charted in the UK (no. 35 UK, 1981). She had success on the reggae charts in 1983 with "Let's Dance", before moving to the United States the following year.

In 1995 she recorded a cover of "My World Is Empty Without You" after returning to Jamaica and signing to Tommy Cowan's Talent Corporation.

In 2006, she released her first album, Steppin.

She has also worked as a model.
