= Two People (band) =

British rock band

- Origin: Liverpool, England
- Genres: Rock, pop, new wave
- Years active: 1984–1987
- Labels: Polydor Records
- Members: Mark Stevenson; Noel Ram

Two People was a mid-1980s British band consisting of Mark Stevenson (lead vocals/guitar) and Noel Ram (guitar/vocals). They released a number of singles between 1985 and 1987, scoring two minor hits on the UK Singles Chart with the songs "This Is the Shirt" and "Heaven". They featured on BBC Radio 1 In Concert in 1985, backed by their live band Brad Lang (bass), Ian Penman (keyboards) and Steve Creese (drums). Their record producers included Nigel Gray, Neil O'Connor and Chris Porter. They were signed to Polydor Records, but despite much promotion, their singles failed expectations and were dropped before releasing an album.

In the 1990s, Noel Ram became a dance producer, performing and remixing a number of singles.

== Discography ==
7" singles

- Feb 1985: "Rescue Me"
- Apr 1985: "This Is the Shirt" - UK No. 87
- Sep 1986: "Mouth of an Angel"
- Jan 1987: "Heaven" - UK No. 63
- Apr 1987: "This Is the Shirt" (re-issue) - UK No. 98
