= Fall Out (song) =

1977 single by the Police

- 1977 record sleeve

Single by the Police
- B-side: "Nothing Achieving"
- Released: May 1977
- Recorded: 12 February 1977
- Studio: Pathway, London
- Genre: Punk rock
- Length: 2:03
- Label: Illegal
- Songwriter: Stewart Copeland
- Producers: Stewart Copeland; Bazza (Barry Hammond)

The Police singles chronology
"Fall Out" (1977)	"Roxanne" (1978)

1979 Re-issue cover

"Fall Out" is a song by British rock band the Police. It was released as their first single in May 1977 with "Nothing Achieving" on its B-side. It was re-released on 9 November 1979. A non-album track, it has appeared on a number of compilation and live albums including Message in a Box: The Complete Recordings, The Police and Live!

== Background ==
"Fall Out" was written by drummer Stewart Copeland, and was one of the first songs he presented to lead singer and bassist Sting when the Police were forming.

"This was one of the first songs Stewart played me. What they [the songs] lacked in sophistication they made up for in energy. I just went along with them and sang them as hard as I could. No, it wasn't false punk. I mean what's a real punk? Our first record was entirely a tribute to Stewart's energy and focus. The band wouldn't have happened without him."

— Sting, 'Message in a Box' Liner Notes, 1993

The single was recorded before the Police had done any live performances, using a budget of £150 borrowed from Paul Mulligan, and is the only Police recording featuring original guitarist Henry Padovani. Due to nervousness in the studio, Padovani only played the guitar solos for both tracks, with Copeland playing the other guitar parts. Copeland used a Gibson SG for his parts, while Padovani used a Jacobacci.

"It was a heartfelt lyric, all about a personal disinclination to follow the styles of my peers. It was the first song that we rehearsed as the Police and also our first recording. We recorded it in a tiny studio and it was one of the rare instances in which I got to play the guitar. On this track and on Nothing Achieving I played the main guitar tracks and Henri Padovani did the solo in the middle."

— Stewart Copeland, 'Message in a Box' Liner Notes, 1993

The b-side, "Nothing Achieving" was written by Stewart Copeland and his brother Ian, with Ian being responsible for most of the lyrics. Both tracks were produced by Stewart Copeland and "Bazza", which was the nickname of engineer Barry Farmer.

The cover art for the single is a photo of the group taken on the roof of Copeland's apartment by his friend Lawrence Impey. Padovani's unusual grimace on the cover, though appropriate for the punk look of the time, was actually a result of his having a major toothache on the day of the shoot. The actual packaging of the 7" singles was done by Copeland and Sting.

=== Release ===
"Fall Out" was released on the Illegal Records label, part of the Faulty Products group of companies owned by Copeland's brother Miles. Sting has cited Mick Jagger's review of the single in Sounds magazine as contributor to its success, saying, "we had a coup when Mick Jagger reviewed it in a music weekly called Sounds." Jagger called the song "competently played rock, with nasal annihilated vocals." Ultimate Classic Rock critic Mike Duquette describes the theme as "a man going insane in a post-apocalyptic world." Copeland estimates that the single sold mostly because it was a part of the overall punk movement; the band appears in the cover photograph in clothes that were fashionable at the time and fans of the punk movement were buying any punk single that came out.

"It sold purely on the strength of the cover, because of the fashion at the time. Punk was in and it was one of the first punk records – and there weren't very many to choose from. The average punk had every punk record that was available and when the next one came out which was the Police record, he bought that, too. But still I think it was a good record, so it did more than the average punk single."

— Stewart Copeland, Melody Maker, September 1979

It failed to chart on its original release, but when re-released on 9 November 1979 it made number 47 on the UK Singles Chart, two months after "Message in a Bottle" reached number one. On the Record Business national chart then widely used in Independent Local Radio, which polled more independent shops, the 1979 release made number 26, and number 34 on the Record Business London chart broadcast on Capital Radio. It was later released as part of Message in a Box: The Complete Recordings and The Police.

== Track listing ==
UK 7" vinyl single

1. "Fall Out" (Stewart Copeland) – 2:03
2. "Nothing Achieving" (Stewart Copeland, Ian Copeland) – 1:56

== Personnel ==
- Sting - lead & backing vocals, bass
- Henry Padovani - lead guitar solo
- Stewart Copeland - drums, rhythm guitar, producer

== Charts ==
Chart	Peak position
UK Singles Chart	47 (1979)
UK Independent Chart	48 (1980)
