= Reggatta de Blanc (instrumental) =

Instrumental by The Police

from the album Reggatta de Blanc
- Released: 5 October 1979
- Recorded: Surrey Sound Studios, 1979
- Genre: Post-punk, new wave
- Length: 3:06
- Label: A&M Records
- Songwriter(s): Andy Summers, Sting, Stewart Copeland
- Producer(s): The Police and Nigel Gray

Audio
- "Reggatta de Blanc" on YouTube

"Reggatta de Blanc" is a 1979 musical composition by The Police, and the title track on their second album. The instrumental evolved from improvisational stage jams during early Police performances of the song "Can't Stand Losing You". The track won the Grammy Award for Best Rock Instrumental Performance in 1980.

The song was developed from a live jam during the bridge of "Can't Stand Losing You." Ultimate Classic Rock critic Mike Duquette rated it as the Police's 19th greatest song, saying that it "underlined the Police’s prowess as players."

== Song appearances ==
- "Reggatta de Blanc" was used in The Ongoing History of New Music episode "Alt-Rock's Greatest Instrumentals" from 2003.

== Personnel ==
- Sting – bass, scat vocals
- Stewart Copeland – drums
- Andy Summers – guitar
