= Outlandos d'Amour =

- UK cover

Studio album by the Police
- Released: 17 November 1978
- Recorded: January–September 1978
- Studio: Surrey Sound (Leatherhead)
- Genres: New wave; punk rock; reggae rock
- Length: 38:14
- Label: A&M
- Producer: The Police

The Police chronology
Outlandos d'Amour (1978)	Reggatta de Blanc (1979)

Singles from Outlandos d'Amour
- 1. "Roxanne" Released: 14 April 1978; 2. "Can't Stand Losing You" Released: 8 September 1978; 3. "So Lonely" Released: 24 November 1978

Outlandos d'Amour is the debut studio album by the English rock band the Police, released on 17 November 1978 by A&M Records. Elevated by the success of its lead single, "Roxanne", Outlandos d'Amour peaked at No. 6 on the UK Albums Chart and at No. 23 on the Billboard 200. The album spawned two additional hit singles: "Can't Stand Losing You" and "So Lonely".

Although Outlandos d'Amour received mixed reviews upon its release, it has since been regarded as one of the strongest debut albums ever. Rolling Stone ranked it as the 38th best debut album of all time and the 428th greatest album of all time.

== Background and recording ==
On a budget of £1,500 (£9,000 in 2024) borrowed from their manager, Miles Copeland (brother of drummer Stewart), the Police recorded Outlandos d'Amour at Surrey Sound Studios in an intermittent fashion over six months, with the band recording whenever the studio had free time or another band's sessions were cancelled. Miles Copeland had promised to pay Surrey Sound £2,000 upon completion of the recording, but did not give them the full amount until much later.

Miles occasionally visited the studio during recording, and he reacted to what he heard from the band with vehement derision. However, upon hearing "Roxanne" he had the opposite reaction and took the recording to A&M Records the following day, where he persuaded the record label to release it as a one-off single. Although the single failed to chart, A&M agreed to give the band a second chance with "Can't Stand Losing You". At first, A&M proposed the band create an improved mix of the song, but after five attempts admitted that it could not improve upon the band's mix, and released the original mix for the single. When it became the band's first hit, the label quickly approved the release of the by-then finished album.

Miles had originally wanted to name the album Police Brutality. However, after hearing "Roxanne" and then envisioning a more romantic image for the band, he proposed Outlandos d'Amour instead. This title is a loose French translation of "Outlaws of Love", with the first word being a combination of the words "outlaws" and "commandos", and "d'Amour" meaning "of love".

== Music and lyrics ==
Outlandos d'Amour, while at times incorporating reggae, pop and other elements of what would eventually become the band's definitive sound, is dominated by punk influences. This is evident on the opening track "Next to You", despite it essentially being a love song. Stewart Copeland and guitarist Andy Summers initially felt the lyrics were neither aggressive nor political enough for their style at the time, but bassist and vocalist Sting was adamant about keeping the song as it was. "Next to You" includes a slide guitar solo by Summers, which Copeland initially dismissed as "old wave".

The second track is the reggae-influenced "So Lonely". Sting has said he used Bob Marley's "No Woman, No Cry" as the musical basis for the song, while the lyrics in its verses were recycled from "Fool in Love", a song he originally wrote for his earlier band Last Exit. The song itself, about someone who is lonely after suffering a broken heart, was seen as ironic by a large segment of the band's listeners. Sting disagreed with this sentiment, saying, "No, there's no irony whatsoever. From the outside it might look a bit strange, being surrounded by all this attention and yet experiencing the worst lonely feeling ... but I do. And then suddenly the attention is withdrawn a half an hour later. You're so isolated ..."

"Roxanne" was written by Sting after visiting a red-light district near the band's hotel in Paris. The Police had been staying there in October 1977 to perform at the nearby Nashville Club. The song's title comes from the name of the character in the play Cyrano de Bergerac, an old poster of which was hanging in the hotel foyer. Sting had originally conceived the song as a bossa nova, although Stewart Copeland has been credited for suggesting its final rhythmic form as a tango. During recording, Sting accidentally sat down on a piano keyboard in the studio, resulting in the atonal chord and laughter preserved at the beginning of the track. The Police were initially reluctant about the song, but Miles Copeland was immediately enthusiastic after hearing it.

The remaining two tracks on the first side of the album are "Hole in My Life", another reggae-influenced song by Sting, and "Peanuts", a composition written by Stewart Copeland and Sting about Rod Stewart. The lyrics were meant as an expression of disappointment on Sting's part towards his former idol, of whom he said: "I used to be a great fan of his but something happened to him. I hope I don't end up like that." Having since experienced the celebrity lifestyle himself, he has said he no longer identifies with the song's lyrical content and has come to view Stewart in a different light.

"Can't Stand Losing You" begins side two of the original LP. Written and composed by Sting, the song is about a young lover being driven to suicide following a breakup. In a 1993 interview with The Independent, he described the lyrics as "juvenile", saying that "teenage suicide ... is always a bit of a joke"; he also claimed to have written the lyrics in only five minutes.

The following track, "Truth Hits Everybody", is a punk-influenced song. After that is "Born in the 50's", which details life as a teenager during the 1960s. "Be My Girl—Sally" is a medley of a half-finished song by Sting and an Andy Summers poem about a blow-up doll. This leads into the semi-instrumental closer, "Masoko Tanga", the only song on the album to not become a staple of the band's live performances.

Two other songs from these sessions were excluded from Outlandos d'Amour but released as B-sides for two of its singles: "Dead-End Job", a song credited to Sting and Copeland, on the B-side of "Can't Stand Losing You"; and "No Time This Time" by Sting, on the B-side of "So Lonely". The latter was subsequently included on the band's second album Reggatta de Blanc.

== Release ==
Released on 17 November 1978, Outlandos d'Amour initially performed poorly due to low exposure and an unfavourable reaction from the BBC to its first two singles, "Roxanne" and "Can't Stand Losing You", owing to their subject matter (prostitution and suicide, respectively). The latter was banned by the BBC specifically due to its single cover, which depicted Stewart Copeland "standing on a block of ice with a noose around his neck, waiting for the ice to melt." The record company took notice of the notoriety and in response promoted the band's music with posters detailing how the BBC had banned "Roxanne". "Roxanne" failed to chart in the United Kingdom upon its original release in April 1978. "Can't Stand Losing You", released in August, became the group's first single to break the UK singles chart, reaching No. 42 in October. "So Lonely" was released as the album's third single in November 1978, and did not chart.

The Police's low-budget tour of the United States in support of the album made people across the country aware of the band, and especially "Roxanne", which was released as their first single there. "Roxanne" charted on the Billboard Hot 100 in February 1979, peaking at No. 32 in April of the same year. It was also successful in Canada, where it peaked at No. 31. The song received increasing airplay from radio DJs in both the US and the UK throughout April 1979.

The international success of "Roxanne" spurred a UK reissue of the single in April 1979, which went to No. 12 on the UK singles chart. A subsequent reissue of "Can't Stand Losing You" in June 1979 nearly topped the chart, surpassed only by "I Don't Like Mondays" by the Boomtown Rats. "So Lonely" was also reissued, reaching No. 6 on the UK singles chart in February 1980.

The album itself eventually peaked at No. 6 on the UK Albums Chart in October 1979. In the US, Outlandos d'Amour peaked at number 23 on the Billboard 200. It was certified gold by the Recording Industry Association of America (RIAA) in 1981 for sales of over 500,000 copies in the United States, and in 1984, the album attained platinum certification after shipping one million units. It is the Police's only album not to reach the top position in the UK.

"Can't Stand Losing You" briefly returned to the charts in 1980 as part of the Six Pack singles compilation set, which peaked at No. 17 on the UK singles chart in June 1980. In 1995, a live version of the song was released as a single and reached No. 27 on the chart.

== Critical reception ==
Professional ratings
Review scores
Source	Rating
AllMusic	4.5/5 stars
Chicago Tribune	3/4 stars
The Rolling Stone Album Guide	4/5 stars
The Sacramento Bee	3.5/4 stars
Smash Hits	7/10
Sounds	3.5/5 stars
Spin Alternative Record Guide	7/10
Tiny Mix Tapes	4/5
Uncut	4/5 stars
The Village Voice	B+

Contemporary reviews of the album were largely unfavourable. Tom Carson of Rolling Stone had high praise for the band's technical abilities, but was disparaging of their attempt to tackle sophisticated rock and reggae while posturing as punks. Carson also perceived a lack of emotional conviction on the album, especially in Sting's vocals, concluding that "Outlandos d'Amour isn't monotonous—it's far too jumpy and brittle for that—but its mechanically minded emptiness masquerading as feeling makes you feel cheated ... worn out by all the supercilious, calculated pretense." Robert Christgau of The Village Voice was more positive. He complimented the band's "tuneful, straight-ahead rock and roll" and wrote that almost all of the album's songs "make the cretin in me hop", though only "Can't Stand Losing You" "makes him jump up and down". In Sounds, Phil Sutcliffe viewed Outlandos d'Amour as "a distinctive and mostly enjoyable first album" and credited the band for not excessively flaunting their musical virtuosity, noting that they instead "emphasise starkness and tension, taking the bare framework of punk or reggae as their starting point."

Subsequent retrospective reviews have been more favourable towards the album. Greg Prato of AllMusic called Outlandos d'Amour "by far [the Police's] most direct and straightforward release" and "unquestionably one of the finest debuts to come out of the '70s punk/new wave movement", writing that even many of the lesser-known cuts are outstanding. By 2003, Rolling Stone had reversed their original position on Outlandos d'Amour by ranking the record at No. 434 on its list of the 500 greatest albums of all time, and at No. 428 on the 2012 revised edition of the list. The magazine also ranked Outlandos d'Amour at No. 38 on its 2013 list of the 100 best debut albums of all time, describing the band as "post-punks who could play their instruments, absorbing reggae and jazz into the spare, bouncy sound of their debut album, a record that didn't sound quite like anything before it."

== Track listing ==
All tracks are written by Sting, except where noted.

Side one
No.	Title	Writer(s)	Length
1.	"Next to You"		2:50
2.	"So Lonely"		4:50
3.	"Roxanne"		3:12
4.	"Hole in My Life"		4:55
5.	"Peanuts"	Sting; Stewart Copeland	4:02

Side two
No.	Title	Writer(s)	Length
6.	"Can't Stand Losing You"		2:59
7.	"Truth Hits Everybody"		2:55
8.	"Born in the 50's"		3:45
9.	": Be My Girl"; "Sally; "	Sting; Andy Summers; (Note: "Be My Girl" by Sting; "Sally" by Summers)	3:24
10.	"Masoko Tanga"		5:42
Total length:			38:14

== Personnel ==
Credits are adapted from the album's liner notes.

==== The Police ====
- Sting – bass, vocals, "butt piano" (3)
- Andy Summers – guitar, backwards piano (10), spoken word (9)
- Stewart Copeland – drums

==== Technical ====
- Produced and arranged by The Police
- Engineered by Nigel Gray and Chris Gray
- Masterred by Tony "Tone" Bridge
- Art direction – Michael Ross
- Photography – Janette Beckman
- Design – Les May

== Charts ==
=== Weekly charts ===
Chart (1979–81)	Peak position
Australian Albums (Kent Music Report)	15
Canada Top Albums/CDs (RPM)	22
Dutch Albums (Album Top 100)	2
New Zealand Albums (RMNZ)	6
UK Albums (Official Charts)	6
US Billboard 200	23

Chart (2016)	Peak position
French Albums (SNEP)	103

=== Year-end charts ===
Chart (1979)	Position
Dutch Albums (Album Top 100)	9
New Zealand Albums (RMNZ)	50
US Albums (Billboard 200)	71

Chart (1980)	Position
Dutch Albums (Album Top 100)	58

== Certifications ==
Region	Certification	Certified units/sales
Australia (ARIA)	Platinum	50,000^{^}
Canada (Music Canada)	Platinum	100,000^{^}
France (SNEP)	Platinum	400,000^{*}
Germany (BVMI)	Gold	250,000^{^}
Netherlands (NVPI)	Platinum	100,000^{^}
New Zealand (RMNZ)	Gold	7,500^{‡}
United Kingdom (BPI)	Platinum	300,000^{^}
United States (RIAA)	Platinum	1,000,000^{^}
^{*} Sales figures based on certification alone.^{^} Shipments figures based on certification alone.^{‡} Sales+streaming figures based on certification alone.
