= The Police =

English rock band

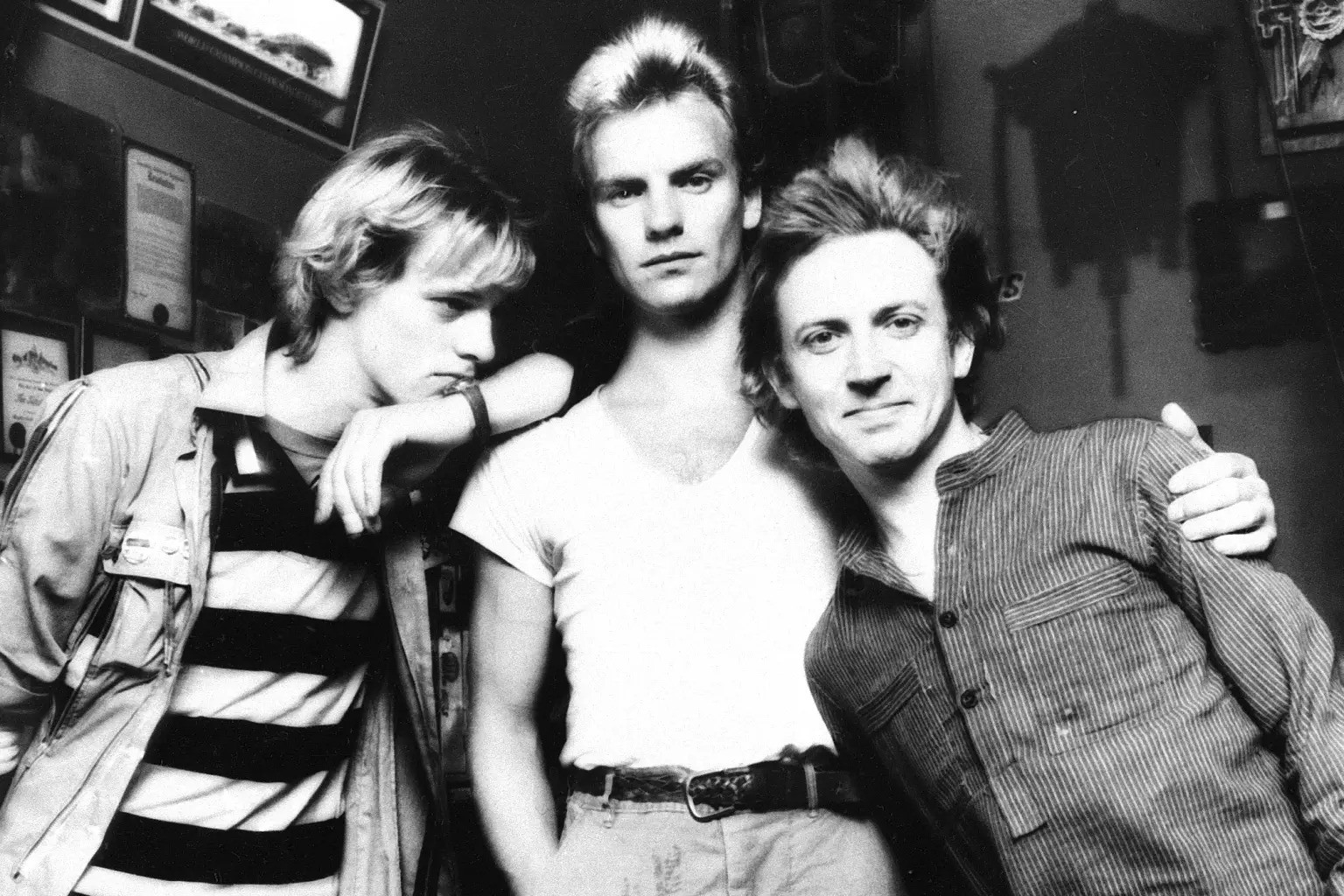
- From left: Stewart Copeland, Sting and Andy Summers in 1979

Background information
- Origin: London, England
- Genres: New wave; reggae rock; post-punk; pop rock
- Works: Albums and singles; songs
- Years active: 1977–1984; 1986; 2007–2008
- Labels: Illegal; A&M
- Spinoffs: Animal Logic; Oysterhead; Gizmodrome
- Spinoff of: Curved Air; Last Exit; Strontium 90
- Past members: Stewart Copeland; Sting; Henry Padovani; Andy Summers
- Website: www.thepolice.com

The Police were an English rock band formed in London in 1977. Their core line-up comprised Sting (lead vocals, bass, primary songwriter), Andy Summers (guitar) and Stewart Copeland (drums, percussion). The Police became globally popular from the late 1970s to the mid-1980s. The band emerged in the British punk scene, but soon expanded into other styles such as new wave, reggae rock, and post-punk.

The Police's debut album, Outlandos d'Amour (1978), reached number six on the UK Albums Chart and contains the singles "Roxanne" and "Can't Stand Losing You". Reggatta de Blanc (1979) was the first of four consecutive number-one studio albums in the UK and Australia; "Message in a Bottle" and "Walking on the Moon" were the Police's first UK number-one singles. Zenyatta Mondatta (1980) and Ghost in the Machine (1981), were also successful, with two songs, "Don't Stand So Close to Me" and "Every Little Thing She Does Is Magic", becoming UK number-one singles and top five-hits in other countries. Zenyatta Mondatta was their breakthrough in the US, reaching number five on the US Billboard 200.

The Police's final studio album, Synchronicity (1983), was number one in the UK, Canada, Australia, Italy, and the US, selling over eight million copies in the US. Its lead single, "Every Breath You Take", became the Police's fifth UK number one and their only US number one. The Police were considered one of the leaders of the Second British Invasion of the US: in 1983 Rolling Stone described them as "the first British new wave act to break through in America on a grand scale, and possibly the biggest band in the world". The Police disbanded in 1984 at the height of their fame. They reunited periodically before fully reuniting in 2007 for a world tour. It was the highest-grossing tour of 2007, making them the world's highest-earning musicians in 2008.

The Police have sold over 75 million records, making them one of the best-selling bands. Their awards include six Grammy Awards, two Brit Awards (winning Best British Group once), and an MTV Video Music Award. In 2003, they were inducted into the Rock and Roll Hall of Fame. Four of their studio albums appeared on Rolling Stone's list of the "500 Greatest Albums of All Time". The Police were included among both Rolling Stone's and VH1's lists of the "100 Greatest Artists of All Time".

== History ==
=== 1977: Formation ===
On 25 September 1976, the American drummer Stewart Copeland was on tour as a member of the British progressive rock band Curved Air. In Newcastle upon Tyne, via the music journalist Phil Sutcliffe, Copeland met the singer-bassist Gordon Sumner, a.k.a. Sting, who at the time was playing in Last Exit, a jazz-rock fusion band. Copeland obtained Sting's number from Sutcliffe's partner. On 14 December 1976, Sting moved to London, and on the day of his arrival, sought out Copeland for a jam session.

I was inspired by the amazing energy of the whole thing, and I thought, "Well, I'm new to London and I'm totally unknown, so I'll give it a go." We did a 15-minute lightning set and I squealed and screamed.

— Sting on his first jam session since arriving in London.

Curved Air had recently split up. Copeland, inspired by the contemporary punk rock movement, was eager to form a band to join the burgeoning London punk scene. While less keen, Sting acknowledged the commercial opportunities, so they formed the Police as a trio, with Corsican guitarist Henry Padovani recruited as the third member. After their debut concert on 1 March 1977 at the Alexandria Club in Newport, Wales (which lasted only ten minutes), the group played London pubs and punk clubs touring as backing band and support act for Cherry Vanilla and for Wayne County & the Electric Chairs. On 1 May 1977, the Police released their debut single "Fall Out" on Illegal Records, recorded at Pathway Studios in Islington, North London on 12 February 1977 (a couple of weeks before the band's debut live performance), with a budget of £150. This is the only Police recording featuring Padovani. Mick Jagger reviewed the single in Sounds.

In May 1977, former Gong musician Mike Howlett invited Sting to join him in the band project Strontium 90. The drummer Howlett had in mind, Chris Cutler, was unavailable, so Sting took Copeland. The band's fourth member was guitarist Andy Summers. A decade older than Sting and Copeland, Summers was a music industry veteran who had played with Eric Burdon and the Animals and Kevin Ayers among others. Strontium 90 performed at a Gong reunion concert in Paris on 28 May 1977, and played at a London club (under the name of "the Elevators") in July. The band also recorded several demo tracks: these were released (along with live recordings and an early version of "Every Little Thing She Does Is Magic") 20 years later on the archive album Strontium 90: Police Academy.

I thought there was fantastic potential in Sting and Stewart. I'd always wanted to play in a three-piece band. I felt that the three of us together would be very strong. They just needed another guitarist and I thought I was the one.

— Summers on Sting and Copeland after first hearing them at the Marquee Club in Oxford Street, London.

Summers impressed Sting, who was becoming frustrated with Padovani's rudimentary abilities and the limitations they imposed on the Police's potential. Shortly after the Strontium 90 gig, Sting approached Summers to join the band. He agreed, on condition the band remain a trio, with him replacing Padovani. Restrained by loyalty, Copeland and Sting resisted the idea, and the Police carried on as a four-piece band. They performed live twice: on 25 July 1977 at the Music Machine in London and on 5 August at the Mont de Marsan Punk Festival. Shortly after these two gigs (and an aborted recording session with ex-Velvet Underground member John Cale as producer on 10 August), Summers delivered an ultimatum to the band and Padovani was dismissed. Copeland later said: "One by one, Sting's songs had started coming in, and when Andy joined, it opened up new numbers of Sting's we could do, so the material started to get a lot more interesting and Sting started to take a lot more interest in the group."

The Police's power trio line-up of Copeland, Sting, and Summers performed for the first time on 18 August 1977 at Rebecca's club in Birmingham in the West Midlands. This line-up endured for the rest of the band's history. Few punk bands were three pieces, while contemporary bands pursuing progressive rock, symphonic rock, and other sound trends usually expanded their line-ups with support players. The musical background of all three players may have made them suspect to punk purists, with music critic Christopher Gable stating:

The truth is that the band merely utilized the trappings of 1970s British punk: the bleached blond short hair, Sting in his jumpsuits or army jackets, Copeland and his near maniacal drumming style. In fact, they were criticized by other punk bands for not being authentic and lacking "street cred". What The Police did perhaps take from punk was a brand of nervous, energetic disillusion with 1970s Britain.

The band also drew on influences from reggae to jazz to progressive and pub rock. While maintaining the main band, Police members continued to moonlight within the art rock scene. In late 1977 and early 1978, Sting and Summers recorded and performed as part of an ensemble led by German experimental composer Eberhard Schoener; Copeland also joined for a time. These performances resulted in three albums, a mix of rock, electronica and jazz. Various appearances by the Schoener outfit on German television made the German public aware of Sting's unusual high-pitched voice, and helped pave the way for the Police's later popularity.

The bleached-blond hair that became a band trademark happened by accident. In February 1978, the band, desperate for money, were asked to do a commercial for Wrigley's Spearmint chewing gum (directed by Tony Scott) on the condition they dye their hair blond in order to play a punk band (blond being associated with punk at the time). The commercial was shot with the band—Summers states, "There's a shot of us carrying a 6-foot-long packet of Wrigley's across the room"—but was never aired.

=== 1977–1978: Recording contract and Outlandos d'Amour ===
Copeland's older brother Miles was initially sceptical of the inclusion of Summers in the band, fearing it would undermine their punk credibility, and reluctantly agreed to provide £1,500 to finance the Police's first album. Outlandos d'Amour was made with no manager or record deal. It was recorded during off-peak hours at the Surrey Sound Studios in Leatherhead, Surrey, a converted recording facility above a dairy which was run by brothers Chris and Nigel Gray.

During one of his studio visits, Miles heard "Roxanne" for the first time at the end of a session. He had been less enthusiastic about the band's other songs, but the elder Copeland was struck by the track, and got the Police a record deal with A&M Records on the strength of it. "Roxanne" was issued as a single in early 1978, while other album tracks were still being recorded, but failed to chart. It also failed to make the BBC's playlist, which the band attributed to the song's depiction of prostitution. A&M consequently promoted the single with posters claiming "Banned by the BBC", though it was never banned, just not play-listed. Copeland later said, "We got a lot of mileage out of it being supposedly banned by the BBC."

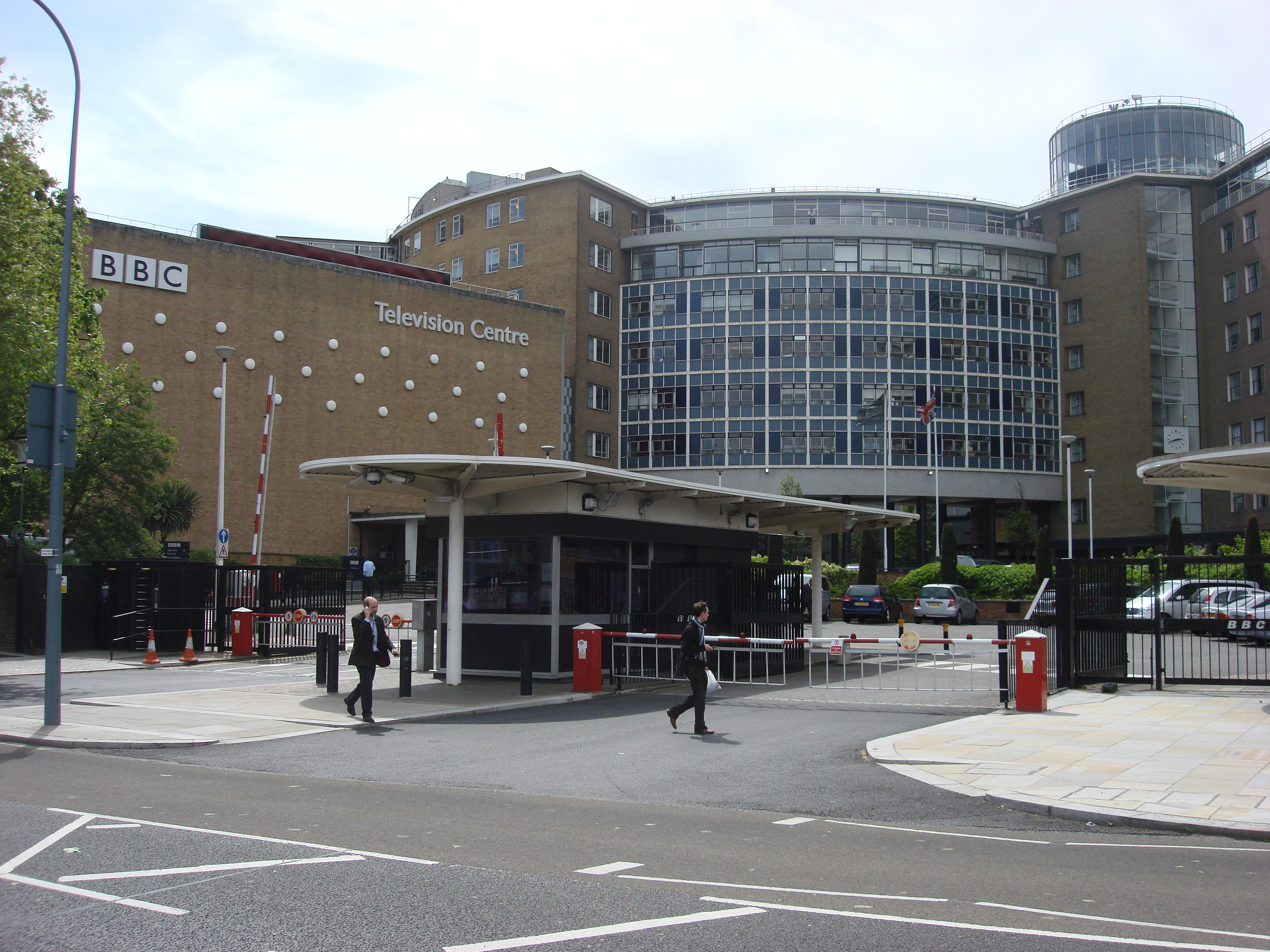
BBC Television Centre, where the Police made their television debut on The Old Grey Whistle Test in 1978, and where they made their first appearance on Top of the Pops in 1979

The Police made their first television appearance in October 1978, on BBC2's The Old Grey Whistle Test to promote the release of Outlandos d'Amour. The BBC banned the second single from Outlandos d'Amour, "Can't Stand Losing You" due to the single's cover, which featured Copeland hanging himself over an ice block being melted by a portable radiator. The single became the Police's first chart hit, peaking at No. 42 in the UK. The follow-up single, "So Lonely", issued in November 1978, failed to chart. In February 1979, "Roxanne" was issued as a single in North America, where it was played on radio despite the subject matter. The song peaked at No. 31 in Canada and No. 32 in the US, spurring a UK re-release of it in April. The band performed "Roxanne" on BBC1's Top of the Pops, and the re-issue of the song peaked at No. 12 on the UK singles chart.

The group's UK success led to gigs in the US at the famous New York City club CBGB, The Rathskeller in Boston, and at The Chance in Poughkeepsie, New York, from which "Roxanne" debuted on US radio on WPDH, and a gruelling 1979 North American tour in which the band drove themselves and their equipment around the country in a Ford Econoline van. That year, "Can't Stand Losing You" was also re-released in the UK, peaking at No. 2. The group's first single, "Fall Out", was reissued in late 1979, peaking at No. 47 in the UK.

=== 1979: Reggatta de Blanc ===
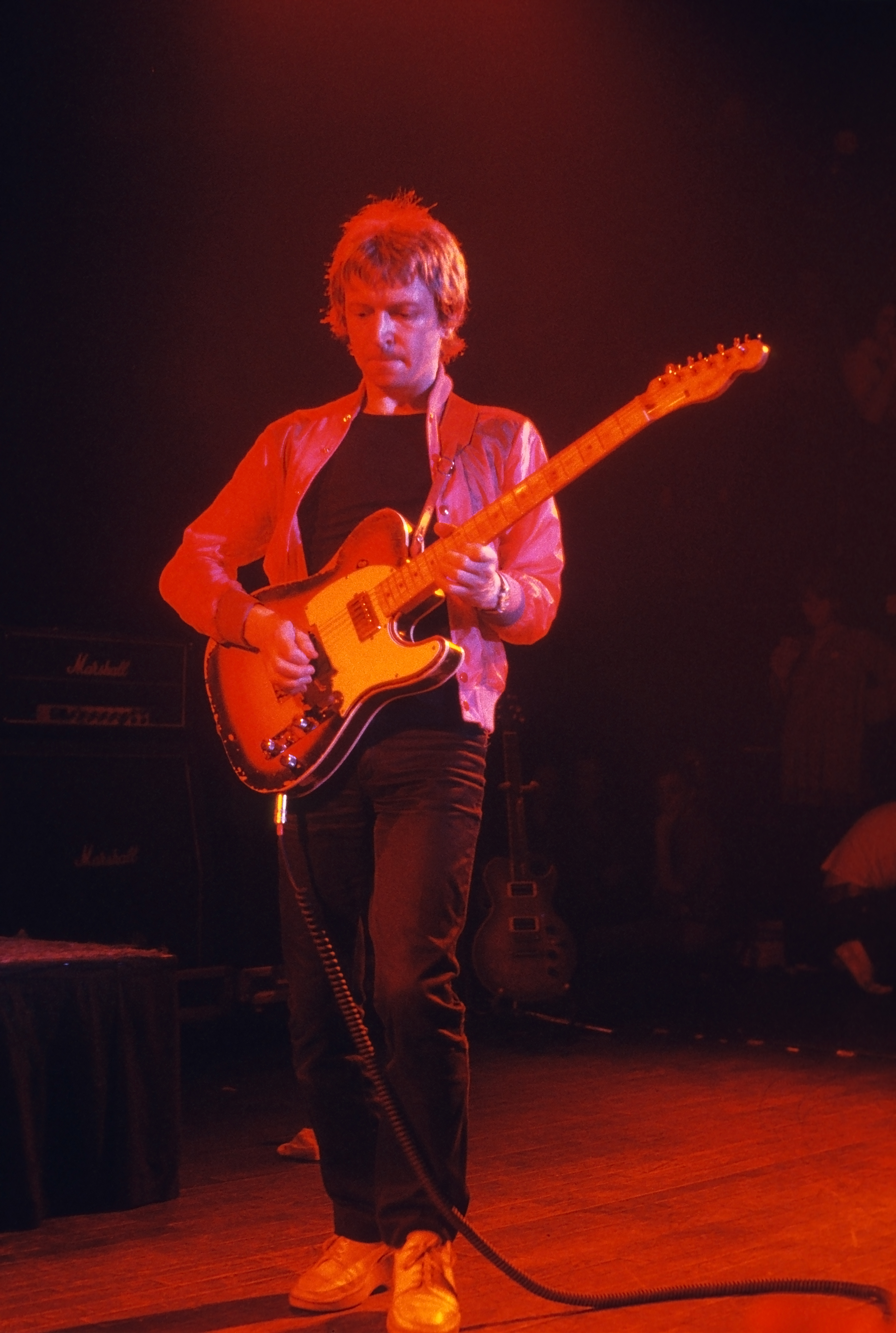
Summers performing with the band in 1979

In October 1979, the group released their second album, Reggatta de Blanc, which topped the UK Albums Chart and became the first of four consecutive UK No. 1 studio albums. The album spawned the hit singles "Message in a Bottle" (No. 1 UK, No. 2 Canada, No. 5 Australia) and "Walking on the Moon" (No. 1 UK). The album's singles failed to enter the US top 40, but Reggatta de Blanc reached No. 25 on the US album charts.

The band's first live performance of "Message in a Bottle" was on the BBC's television show Rock Goes to College filmed at Hatfield Polytechnic College in Hertfordshire. The instrumental title track "Reggatta de Blanc" won the Grammy Award for Best Rock Instrumental Performance. In February 1980, the single "So Lonely" was reissued in the UK, peaking at No. 6.

In March 1980, the Police began their first world tour, including Mexico, India, Taiwan, Hong Kong, Greece and Egypt. The tour was subsequently documented in the film The Police Around the World (1982), directed by Kate and Derek Burbidge, which contains footage shot by Annie Nightingale originally intended for a BBC production The Police in the East.

In May 1980, A&M in the UK released Six Pack, a package containing the five A&M singles (not including "Fall Out") in their original sleeves plus a mono alternate take of the album track "The Bed's Too Big Without You" backed with a live version of "Truth Hits Everybody". It reached No. 17 in the UK Singles Chart (although chart regulations introduced later in the decade would have classed it as an album).

=== 1980–1981: Zenyatta Mondatta ===
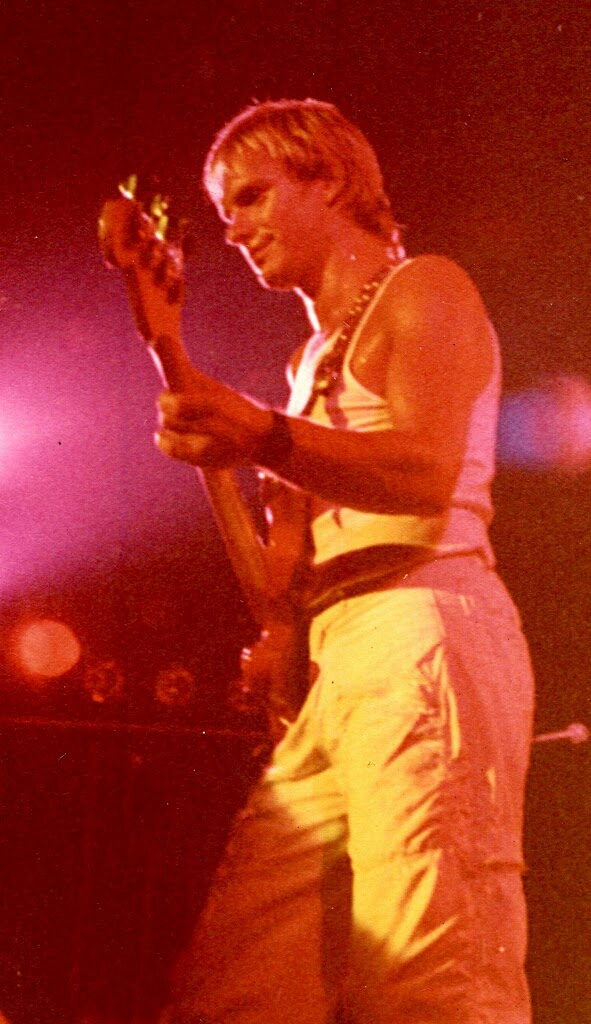
Sting with the Police in Buenos Aires, 1980

Pressured by their record company for a new record and a prompt return to touring, the Police released their third album, Zenyatta Mondatta, on 3 October 1980. The album was recorded in a three-week period in the Netherlands for tax reasons and was completed the night before the band embarked on a new world tour. The album topped the UK Albums Chart and reached number five on the US Billboard 200. It also gave the group their third UK No. 1 hit single, "Don't Stand So Close to Me" (the UK's best-selling single of 1980) and another hit single, "De Do Do Do, De Da Da Da", both of which reached No. 10 in the US.

While the three band members and co-producer Nigel Gray all expressed immediate regret over the rushed recording for the album, which was finished at 4 a.m. on the day the band began their world tour, the album received praise from critics. The instrumental "Behind My Camel", written by Andy Summers, won the band a Grammy for Best Rock Instrumental Performance, while "Don't Stand So Close to Me" won the Grammy for Best Rock Vocal Performance for Duo or Group.

=== 1981–1982: Ghost in the Machine and Brimstone and Treacle ===
The Police's fourth album, Ghost in the Machine, co-produced by Hugh Padgham, was recorded at AIR Studios on the Caribbean island of Montserrat, with the exception of "Every Little Thing She Does Is Magic" which was recorded at Le Studio at Morin Heights, Quebec, Canada, and released in 1981. It featured thicker sounds, layered saxophones, and vocal textures. It spawned the hit singles "Every Little Thing She Does Is Magic" (featuring pianist Jean Roussel), their fourth UK No. 1 (No. 3 in the US), "Invisible Sun", and "Spirits in the Material World". As the band was unable to agree on a cover picture, the album cover had three red pictographs, digital likenesses of the three band members in the style of segmented LED displays, set against a black background. In the 1980s, Sting and Summers became tax exiles and moved to Ireland (Sting to Roundstone, County Galway, and Summers to Kinsale in County Cork) while Copeland remained in England. The group opened and closed the 1981 concert film, Urgh! A Music War. The film, which captured the music scene in the wake of punk, was masterminded by Stewart Copeland's brothers Ian and Miles. The film had a limited release but developed a mythic reputation over the years.

At the 1982 Brit Awards in London, the Police received the award for Best British Group. After the Ghost in the Machine Tour concluded in 1982, the group took a sabbatical and each member pursued outside projects. By this time, Sting was becoming a major star, and he established a career beyond the Police by branching out into acting. Back in 1979, he had made a well-received debut as the "Ace Face" in the British drama film Quadrophenia, a film loosely based on the Who's 1973 rock opera, followed by a role as a mechanic in love with Eddie Cochran's music in Chris Petit's Radio On. In 1982, Sting furthered his acting career by co-starring in the Richard Loncraine film Brimstone and Treacle. He also had a minor solo hit in the United Kingdom with the movie's theme song, a cover of the 1929 hit "Spread a Little Happiness" (which appeared on the Brimstone & Treacle soundtrack, along with three new Police tracks, "How Stupid Mr Bates", "A Kind of Loving", and "I Burn for You"). Over 1981 and 1982, Summers recorded his first album with Robert Fripp, I Advance Masked.

In 1983, Stewart Copeland composed the musical score for Francis Ford Coppola's teen drama noir film Rumble Fish. The single "Don't Box Me In (theme From Rumble Fish)", a collaboration between Copeland and singer-songwriter Stan Ridgway (of the band Wall of Voodoo) received significant airplay upon release of the film that year. Sting filmed his first big-budget movie role in 1983, playing Feyd-Rautha in David Lynch's Dune. As Sting's fame rose, his relationship with Copeland deteriorated. Their increasingly strained partnership was further stretched by the pressures of worldwide publicity and fame, conflicting egos, and their financial success. Meanwhile, both Sting's and Summers's marriages failed.

=== 1983: Synchronicity ===
MTV has paved the way for a host of invaders from abroad. In return, grateful Brits, even superstars like Pete Townshend and the Police, have mugged for MTV promo spots and made the phrase "I want my MTV" a household commonplace.

— Anglomania: The Second British Invasion, by Parke Puterbaugh for Rolling Stone, November 1983.

In 1983, the Police released their fifth and final studio album, Synchronicity, which spawned the hit singles "Every Breath You Take", "Wrapped Around Your Finger", "King of Pain", and "Synchronicity II". By that time, several critics deemed them "the biggest rock band in the world". Recording the album was a tense affair with increasing disputes among the band. The three members recorded their contributions individually in separate rooms and over-dubbed at different times.

The Synchronicity Tour began in Chicago, Illinois in July 1983 at the original Comiskey Park, and on 18 August the band played in front of 70,000 in Shea Stadium, New York. Near the end of the concert, Sting announced: "We'd like to thank the Beatles for lending us their stadium." Looking back, Copeland states, "Playing Shea Stadium was big because, even though I'm a septic tank (rhyming slang for 'Yank'), The Police is an English band and I'm a Londoner – an American Londoner – so it felt like conquering America." They played throughout the UK in December 1983, including four sold-out nights at London's Wembley Arena, and the tour ended in Melbourne, Australia on 4 March 1984 at the Melbourne Showgrounds (the final concert featured Sunnyboys, Kids in the Kitchen, Bryan Adams and Australian Crawl, with the Police topping the bill). Sting's look, dominated by his orange hair (a result of his role in Dune) and tattered clothing, both of which were emphasised in the music videos from the album, carried over into the set for the concert. Except for "King of Pain", the singles were accompanied by music videos directed by Godley & Creme.

Synchronicity became a No. 1 album in both the UK (where it debuted at No. 1) and the US. It stayed at No. 1 in the UK for two weeks and in the US for seventeen weeks. It was nominated for Grammy Awards for Album of the Year, but lost to Michael Jackson's Thriller (1982). "Every Breath You Take" won the Grammy for Song of the Year, beating Jackson's "Billie Jean". "Every Breath You Take" also won the Grammy for Best Pop Performance by a Duo or Group with Vocal, while the album won the Grammy for Best Rock Performance by a Duo or Group with Vocal. "Every Breath You Take" also won the American Video Award for Best Group video, and the song won two Ivor Novello Awards in the categories Best Song Musically and Lyrically and Most Performed Work from the British Academy of Songwriters, Composers, and Authors (BASCA).

=== 1984–1986: Hiatus, aborted sixth studio album ===
During the group's 1983 Shea Stadium concert, Sting felt performing at the venue was "Everest" and decided to pursue a solo career, according to the documentary The Last Play at Shea (2010). After the Synchronicity tour ended in March 1984, the band went on hiatus while Sting recorded and toured in support of his successful debut solo studio album, the jazz-influenced The Dream of the Blue Turtles, released in June 1985; Copeland recorded and filmed The Rhythmatist (1985); and Summers recorded another album with Robert Fripp (Bewitched, 1984) and the theme song for the film 2010—which was not used in the film, but included on the soundtrack album. At the 1985 Brit Awards held at London's Grosvenor Hotel on 11 February, the band received the award for Outstanding Contribution to Music. In July, Sting and Copeland participated in Live Aid at Wembley Stadium, London.

It was very emotional for them. I think it was clear in Sting's eyes that he was not going to be in a band anymore. They had come together for this tour and that was it.

— Bono, on the Police's final concert at Giants Stadium, June 1986.

In June 1986, the Police reconvened to play three concerts for the Amnesty International A Conspiracy of Hope tour. Their last performance on stage before their split was on 15 June at Giants Stadium in New Jersey. They ended their set with "Invisible Sun", bringing out Bono to sing the final verse. When they finished, they handed U2 their instruments for the all-star finale of "I Shall Be Released". As the lead singer of U2 – who would soon be regarded as the biggest band in the world – Bono stated, "It was a very big moment, like passing a torch."

In July, the trio reunited in the studio to record a new album, but Copeland broke his collarbone in a fall from a horse and was unable to play the drums. As a result of the tense and short-lived reunion in the studio, "Don't Stand So Close to Me '86" was released in October 1986 as their final single and made it into the UK Top 25. It also appeared on the 1986 compilation Every Breath You Take: The Singles, which reached No. 1 on the UK Albums Chart. A rerecorded version of "De Do Do Do, De Da Da Da" was subsequently also included on the DTS-CD release of the Every Breath You Take: The Classics album in 1995. The album has sold over five million copies in the US.

Following the failed effort to record a new studio album, the Police effectively disbanded. In the liner notes to the Police's box set Message in a Box: The Complete Recordings (1993), Summers explains: "The attempt to record a new album was doomed from the outset. The night before we went into the studio Stewart broke his collarbone falling off a horse and that meant we lost our last chance of recovering some rapport just by jamming together. Anyway, it was clear Sting had no real intention of writing any new songs for the Police. It was an empty exercise."

=== 1986–2006: Disbandment ===
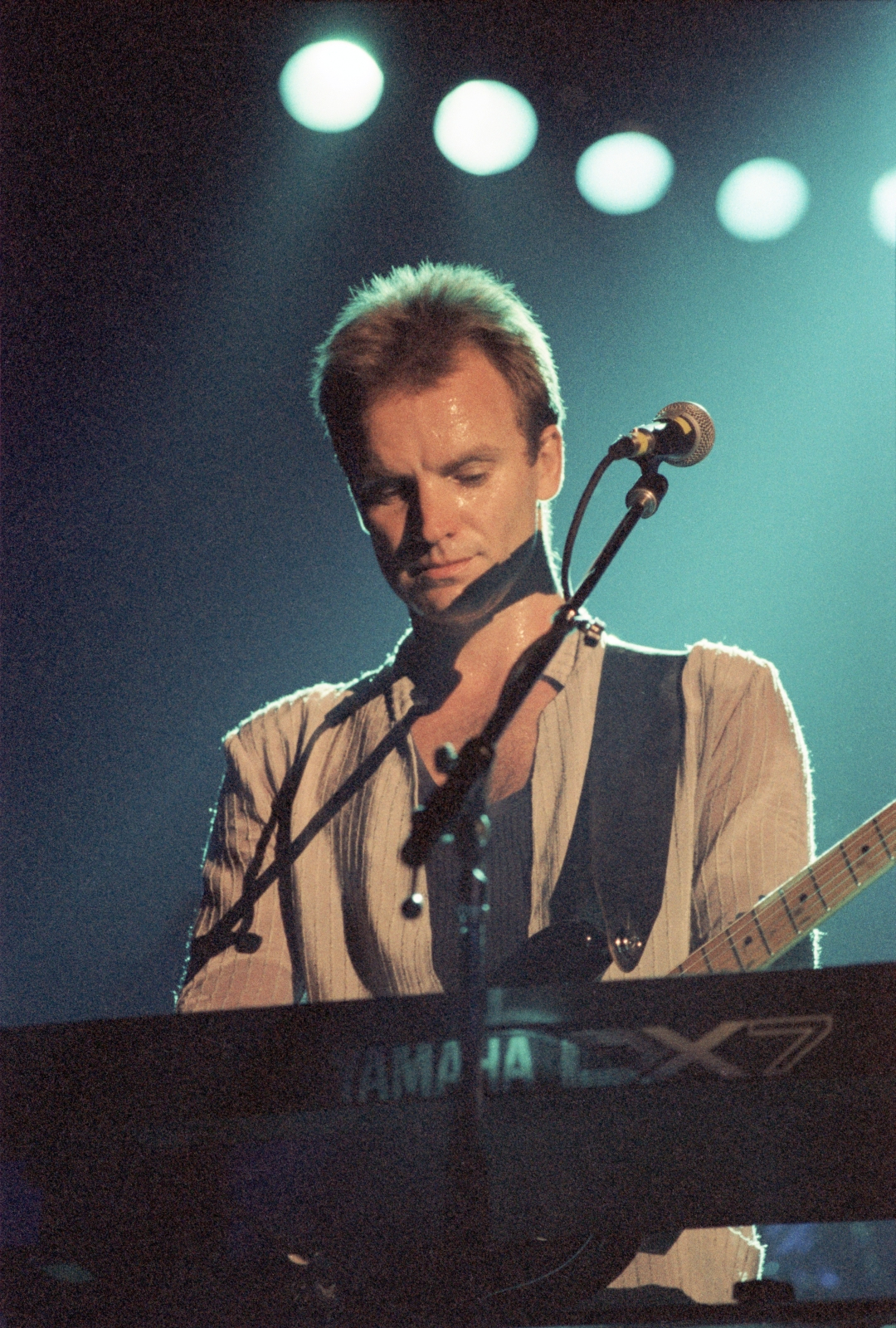
Sting performing as a solo artist in May 1986

The band members continued with their solo careers over the next 20 years. Sting continued recording and touring as a solo performer to great success. Summers recorded several albums, both as a solo artist and in collaboration with other musicians. Copeland became a producer of movie and television soundtracks, and recorded and toured with two new bands, Animal Logic and Oysterhead. A few events brought the Police back together briefly. Summers played guitar on Sting's album ...Nothing Like the Sun (1987), a favour the singer returned by playing bass on Summers's album Charming Snakes (1990) and later singing lead vocals on "'Round Midnight" for his tribute to Thelonious Monk Green Chimneys (1999). On 2 October 1991 (Sting's 40th birthday), Summers joined Sting on stage at the Hollywood Bowl during The Soul Cages Tour to perform "Walking on the Moon", "Every Breath You Take", and "Message in a Bottle". The performance was broadcast as a pay-per-view event.

On 22 August 1992, Sting married Trudie Styler in an 11th-century chapel in Wiltshire, southwest England. Summers and Copeland were invited to the ceremony and reception. Aware that all band members were present, the wedding guests pressured the trio into playing, and they performed "Roxanne" and "Message in a Bottle". Copeland said later that "after about three minutes, it became 'the thing' again". In 1995 A&M released Live!, a double live album produced by Summers featuring two complete concerts—one recorded on 27 November 1979 at the Orpheum Theatre in Boston during the Reggatta de Blanc tour, and one recorded on 2 November 1983 at the Omni in Atlanta, Georgia, during the Synchronicity Tour (the latter was also documented in the VHS tape Synchronicity Concert in 1984).

On 10 March 2003, the Police were inducted into the Rock and Roll Hall of Fame and performed "Roxanne", "Message in a Bottle", and "Every Breath You Take" live, as a group (the last song was performed alongside Steven Tyler, Gwen Stefani, and John Mayer). In late 2003, Sting released his autobiography, Broken Music.

In 2004, Copeland and Summers joined Incubus onstage at KROQ's Almost Acoustic Christmas concert in Los Angeles performing "Roxanne" and "Message in a Bottle". In 2004, Henry Padovani released an album with Copeland and Sting playing on one track, reuniting the original Police line-up for the first time since 1977. Also in 2004, Rolling Stone ranked the Police No. 70 on their list of the 100 Greatest Artists of All Time.

In 2006, Stewart Copeland released a rockumentary about the band called Everyone Stares: The Police Inside Out, based on Super-8 filming he did when the band was touring and recording in the late 1970s and early 1980s. In October 2006, Andy Summers released One Train Later, an autobiographical memoir about his early career and time with the band.

=== 2007–2008: Reunion tour ===
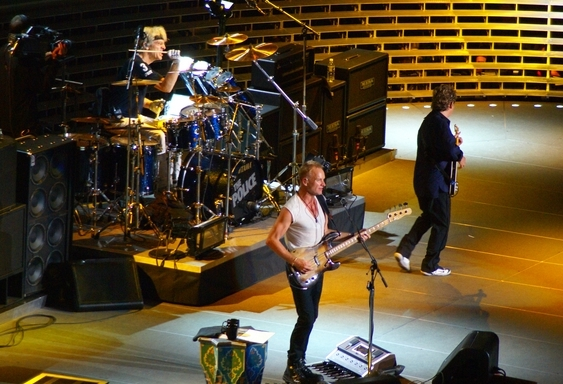
The Police performing in August 2007 during their reunion tour

In early 2007, reports surfaced the trio would reunite for a tour to mark the Police's 30th anniversary, more than 20 years since their split in 1986. On 22 January 2007, the punk wave magazine Side-Line broke the story the Police would reunite for the Grammys, and would perform "Roxanne". Side-Line also stated the Police were to embark on a massive world tour. Billboard magazine later confirmed the news, quoting Summers' 2006 statement as to how the band could have continued post-Synchronicity:

The more rational approach would have been, "OK, Sting, go make a solo record, and let's get back together in two or three years." I'm certain we could have done that. Of course we could have. We were definitely not in a creative dry space. We could have easily carried on, and we could probably still be there. That wasn't to be our fate. It went in another way. I regret we never paid it off with a last tour.

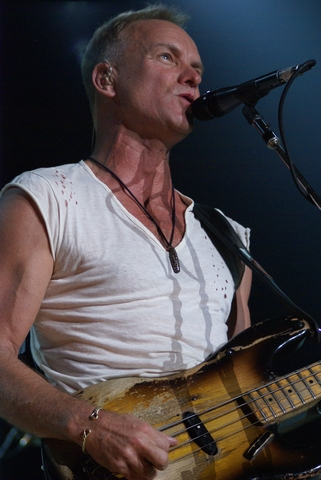
Sting with the group at Madison Square Garden, August 2007

The band opened the 49th Annual Grammy Awards on 11 February 2007 in Los Angeles, announcing, "Ladies and gentlemen, we are The Police, and we're back!" before launching into "Roxanne".

A&M, the band's record company, promoted the 2007–08 reunion tour as the 30th anniversary of the band's formation and of the release of their first single for A&M, "Roxanne". The Police Reunion Tour began in late May 2007 with two shows in Vancouver. Stewart Copeland gave a scathing review of the show on his own website, which the press interpreted as a feud occurring two gigs into the tour. Copeland later apologised for besmirching "my buddy Sting," and chalked up the comments to "hyper self-criticism".

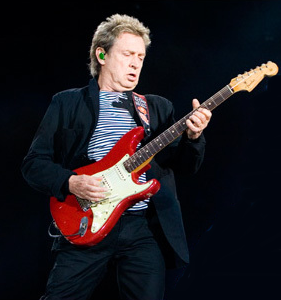
Summers performing in Marseille with the group, June 2008

Tickets for the British leg of the tour sold out within 30 minutes, and the band played two nights at Twickenham Stadium on 8 and 9 September. On 29 and 30 September 2007, Padovani joined the group on stage for the final encore of their two shows in Paris, playing the song "Next to You" as a four-piece band. In October 2007, the group played the largest gig of the reunion tour in Dublin in front of 82,000 fans. The group headlined the TW Classic festival in Werchter, Belgium on 7 June 2008. They also headlined the last night of the 2008 Isle of Wight Festival on 15 June, the Heineken Jammin' Festival in Venice on 23 June and the Sunday night at Hard Rock Calling (previously called Hyde Park Calling) in London on 29 June.

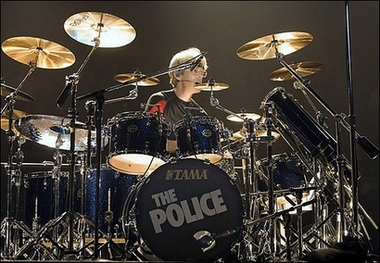
Copeland performing in Marseille with the group

In February 2008, the band announced that, when the tour finished, they would break up again. "There will be no new album, no big new tour," said Sting. "Once we're done with our reunion tour, that's it for The Police." The final show of the tour was on 7 August 2008 at Madison Square Garden in New York City. The band performed the opening song, "Message in a Bottle", with the brass band of the New York Metropolitan Police Corp. Later, they performed "Sunshine of Your Love" and "Purple Haze" as a tribute to the rock trios that preceded them: Cream and The Jimi Hendrix Experience. While announcing the show, the group also donated $1 million to New York Mayor Michael Bloomberg's initiative to plant one million trees in the city by 2017.

The Police were the world's highest-earning musicians in 2008, as the tour sold 3.7 million tickets and grossed $358 million, making it the third-highest-grossing tour of all time at its conclusion. On 11 November 2008, the Police released Certifiable: Live in Buenos Aires, a Blu-ray, DVD and CD set of the band's two performances in Buenos Aires, Argentina on the tour (1 and 2 December 2007). Those sets with two DVDs also included a documentary shot by Copeland's son Jordan entitled Better Than Therapy as well as photographs of Buenos Aires taken by Andy Summers.

== Musical style ==
The Police started as a punk rock band, but soon incorporated reggae, pop and new wave elements to their sound. In his retrospective assessment, Stephen Thomas Erlewine of AllMusic argues that the notion of the Police as a punk rock band was true only "in the loosest sense of the term". He states the band's "nervous, reggae-injected pop/rock was punky" and had a "punk spirit" but it "wasn't necessarily punk". A power trio, the Police are also known as a new wave and post-punk band, with many songs falling in the reggae-fusion genre.

In an interview with Musician magazine for the December 1987 issue, Sting stated:

I'm an opportunist. I saw this vacuum between punk, which was unschooled, and the horrible corporate rock on the other side. I saw this thing in the middle that was clean and simple. That's what "Roxanne" is; it's so simple and bare. It's not the energy of Never Mind the Bollocks, nor is it corporate rock. It's right in between them; we just took that path because it was just so clear to me. There was a vacuum there. There was all this fierce energy, and everybody was terrified of it and moved aside, and the corporate rock bands were on this height and they didn't know what was going on. I think the Police was the band that took it, and everybody followed us.

== Legacy ==
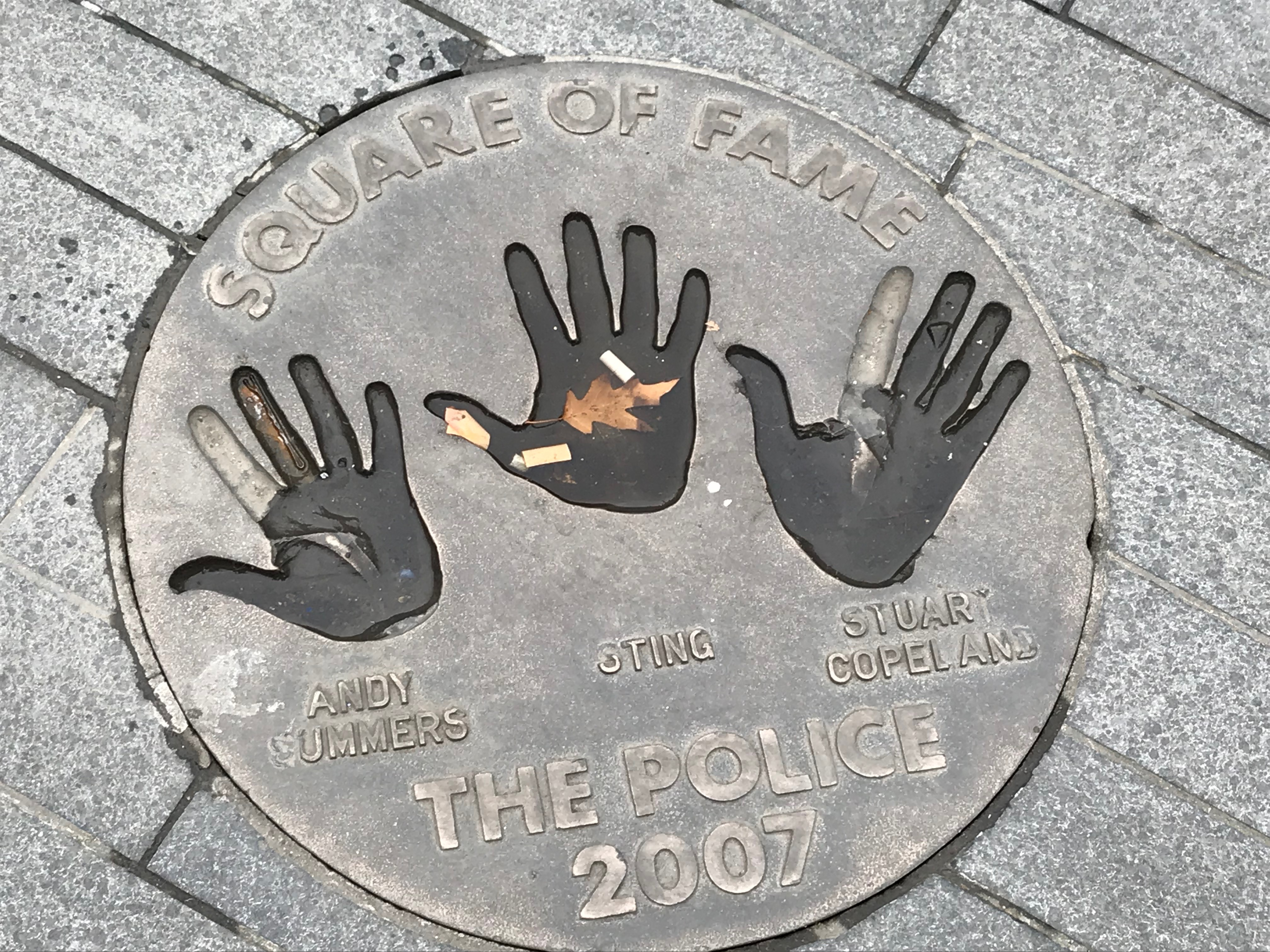
Handprints of the Police at the Wembley Square of Fame in London

In 2003, the Police were inducted into the Rock and Roll Hall of Fame in their first year of eligibility. In 2004, Rolling Stone ranked the Police number 70 on their list of the 100 Greatest Artists of All Time, and in 2010, they were ranked 40th on VH1's 100 Greatest Artists of All Time. Four of their five studio albums appeared on Rolling Stone's 2003 list of the 500 Greatest Albums of All Time: Ghost in the Machine (number 322), Reggatta de Blanc (number 369), Outlandos d'Amour (number 434), and Synchronicity (number 455). In 2008, Q magazine named Synchronicity among the top 10 British Albums of the 1980s.

The primary songwriter for the Police, Sting was inducted into the Songwriters Hall of Fame in 2002. In Rolling Stone's 2004 list of the 500 greatest songs of all time, "Every Breath You Take" ranked number 84 (the highest new wave song on the list), and "Roxanne" ranked number 388. "Message in a Bottle" ranked number 65 in the magazine's 2008 list of the 100 greatest guitar songs. Q magazine named "Every Breath You Take" among the top 10 British Songs of the 1980s, and in a UK-wide poll by ITV in 2015 it was voted The Nation's Favourite 80s Number One. In May 2019, "Every Breath You Take" was recognised by BMI as being the most performed song in their catalogue, overtaking "You've Lost That Lovin' Feelin'" performed by the Righteous Brothers.

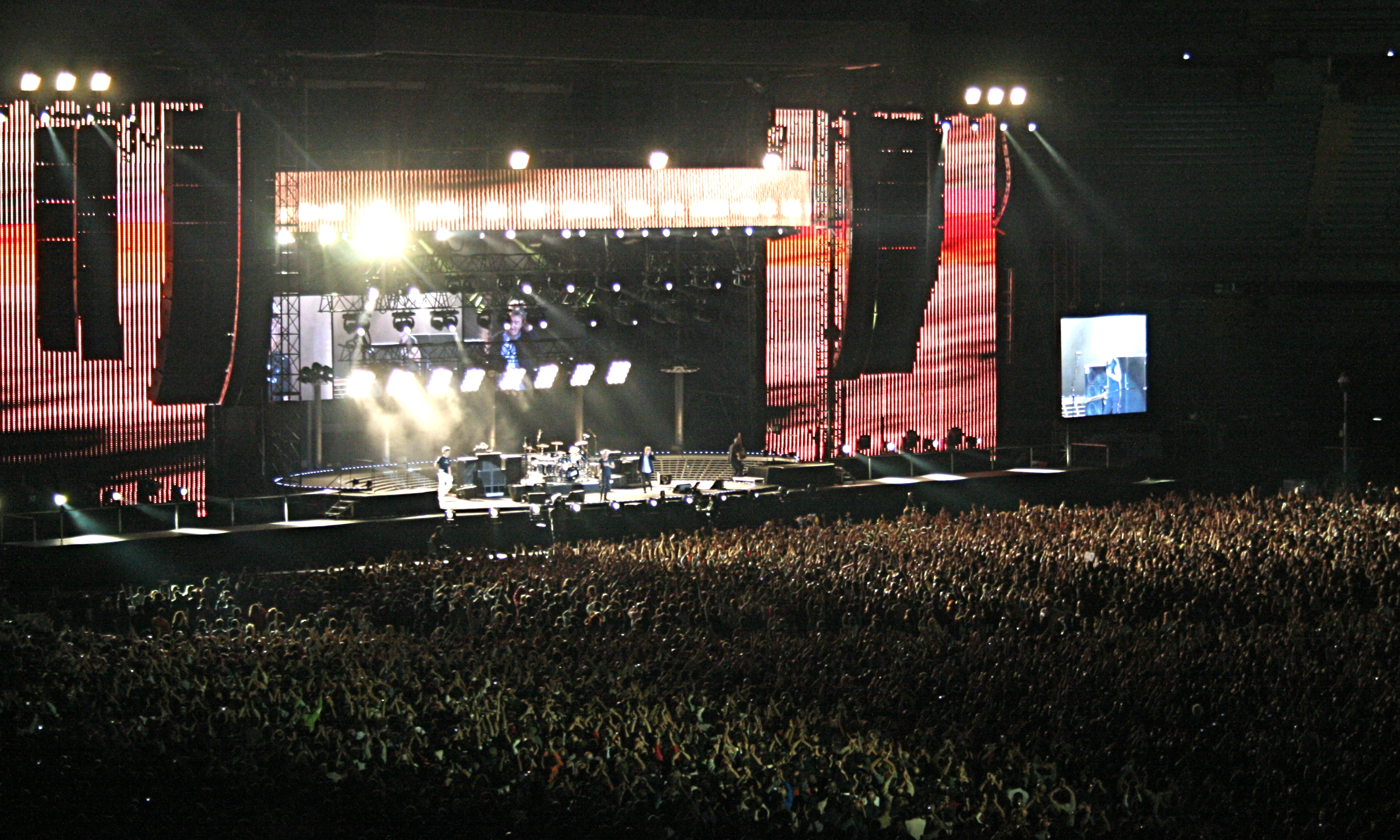
The Police (pictured on stage in the Stadio Delle Alpi, Turin in 2007) are known for their stadium rock.

With a string of UK number one albums, the Police were among the most commercially successful British bands of the early 1980s, and with success overseas they are typically regarded as in both the vanguard of the Second British Invasion, and the new wave movement. With a history of playing to large audiences, the Police were a featured artist in the stadium rock episode of the 2007 BBC/VH1 series Seven Ages of Rock along with Queen, Led Zeppelin, U2 and Bruce Springsteen.

Despite the band's well-documented disagreements with one another, Summers said in 2015 that Sting, Copeland and he are good friends. Summers said, "Despite the general press thing about 'God, they hate each other', it's actually not true, we're very supportive of one another." While remembering his time with the Police fondly and still retaining love for his former bandmates, Copeland recalled in 2022 that working with Sting musically "was like a Prada suit made out of barbed wire" and that, rather than get involved in the creative infighting, Summers would enjoy "throwing bombs" to egg on the younger men. "It was never an ego-clash", Copeland said. Ruminating on the reunion shows in 2022, Sting concluded that the band had served its time: "It was cashing that asset in, saying, Let's do it one more time and see what happens. It was hugely successful but I wouldn't do it again. That would be a bridge too far."

== Discography ==
- Outlandos d'Amour (1978)
- Reggatta de Blanc (1979)
- Zenyatta Mondatta (1980)
- Ghost in the Machine (1981)
- Synchronicity (1983)

== Concert tours ==
- The Police Around the World Tour (1977–1980)
- Zenyatta Mondatta Tour (1980–1981)
- Ghost in the Machine Tour (1981–1982)
- Synchronicity Tour (1983–1984)
- A Conspiracy of Hope Tour (1986)
- The Police Reunion Tour (2007–2008)

== Band members ==
=== Final line-up ===
- Sting – lead and backing vocals, bass guitar, double bass, keyboards, synthesizers (1977–1984, 1986, 2007–2008)
- Stewart Copeland – drums, percussion, backing and occasional lead vocals (1977–1984, 1986, 2007–2008)
- Andy Summers – guitars, backing and occasional lead vocals, keyboards (1977–1984, 1986, 2007–2008)

=== Past members ===
- Henry Padovani – guitars (1977)

== Awards and nominations ==
=== Brit Awards ===
- 1982: Best British Group
- 1985: Outstanding Contribution to Music

=== Grammy Awards ===
| Year | Nominee / work | Award | Result |
|---|---|---|---|
| 1981 | "Reggatta de Blanc" | Best Rock Instrumental Performance | Won |
| 1982 | "Behind My Camel" | Best Rock Instrumental Performance | Won |
| 1982 | "Don't Stand So Close to Me" | Best Rock Performance by a Duo or Group with Vocal | Won |
| 1984 | Synchronicity | Album of the Year | Nominated |
| 1984 | Synchronicity | Best Rock Performance by a Duo or Group with Vocal | Won |
| 1984 | "Every Breath You Take" | Record of the Year | Nominated |
| 1984 | "Every Breath You Take" | Best Pop Performance by a Duo or Group with Vocal | Won |
| 1986 | The Police Synchronicity Concert | Best Music Video, Long Form | Nominated |

Note: "Every Breath You Take" won Song of the Year in 1984, but in this category the award goes to the composer(s) of the song, not to the performing artist(s). The song was written and composed by Sting, the Police's vocalist.

=== Juno Awards ===
| Year | Nominee / work | Award | Result |
|---|---|---|---|
| 1984 | Synchronicity | International Album of the Year | Won |

=== People's Choice Awards ===
| Year | Nominee / work | Award | Result |
|---|---|---|---|
| 2008 | Themselves | Favorite Reunion Tour | Won |

=== Rock and Roll Hall of Fame ===
- The Police were inducted into the Rock and Roll Hall of Fame on 10 March 2003.

=== Other lists ===
- Ranked No.70 on Rolling Stone's Immortals, the 100 Greatest Artists of All Time.
- Ranked No.40 on VH1's List of 100 Greatest Artists of All Time.

== See also ==
- List of British Grammy winners and nominees
- List of best-selling music artists
- List of highest-grossing concert tours
- List of new wave artists
- List of reggae rock artists
