= So Lonely =

1978 single by the Police

Single by the Police

from the album Outlandos d'Amour
- B-side: "No Time This Time"
- Released: 24 November 1978
- Recorded: 1978
- Genre: Reggae rock; new wave
- Length: 4:50 (album); 3:10 (single/video)
- Label: A&M – AMS 7402
- Songwriter: Sting
- Producer: The Police

The Police singles chronology
"Can't Stand Losing You" (1978)	"So Lonely" (1978)	"Message in a Bottle" (1979)

Alternative cover
- Netherlands 7-inch cover

Music video
- "So Lonely" on YouTube

"So Lonely" is a song by British rock band the Police, released as the third and final single on 24 November 1978 from their debut studio album Outlandos d'Amour (1978). The single was re-released in the UK in February 1980, and reached No. 6 on the charts. The song uses a reggae style, and features Sting on lead vocals.

== Background ==
Sting said he based the song on Bob Marley's "No Woman, No Cry":

"People thrashing out three chords didn't really interest us musically. Reggae was accepted in punk circles and musically more sophisticated, and we could play it, so we veered off in that direction. I mean let's be honest here, 'So Lonely' was unabashedly culled from 'No Woman No Cry' by Bob Marley & the Wailers. Same chorus. What we invented was this thing of going back and forth between thrash punk and reggae. That was the little niche we created for ourselves."

— Sting, Revolver 4/2000

Sting recycled the lyrics in the song's verses from his earlier Last Exit song "Fool in Love". The lyrics themselves, about someone who is lonely after getting his heart broken, were thought to be "ironic" to large audiences. Sting denied this: "No, there's no irony whatsoever. From the outside it might look a bit strange, being surrounded by all this attention and yet experiencing the worst lonely feeling...but I do. And then suddenly the attention is withdrawn a half an hour later. You're so isolated..."

The song is known for a famous mondegreen where the title is often misheard as "Sue Lawley", a broadcaster famous as a BBC television newsreader at the time the song was released, and later for presenting Desert Island Discs on BBC Radio 4 from 1988 to 2006. The misunderstanding was ranked as the most frequently misheard lyric in a 2020 survey of UK adults. The title has also been the subject of other mondegreens, including "Salami", "Sigourney", and "Zamboni".

== Release ==
"So Lonely" was released as the third and final single from Outlandos d'Amour on 24 November 1978, following "Roxanne" and "Can't Stand Losing You". The single did not chart on the first occasion, but reached No. 6 with its second release. Record Business had reported in February 1980 that the band's record label, A&M, had encouraged record stores in the United Kingdom to purchase additional copies of the single upon its initial ascension up the charts. The other singles from Outlandos d'Amour followed a similar pattern of not charting very high in 1978, but doing very well on a re-release.

The video for the song depicts the band walking around the streets of Hong Kong and on the subway trains of Tokyo in 1980. The band lip-syncs into walkie-talkies, while Stewart Copeland performs drum fills on random objects, such as vehicles, items for sale, construction equipment, and signs.

The B-side "No Time This Time" was originally a non-album track, but the same recording later appeared on their album Reggatta de Blanc to pad out the short running time.

== Track listing ==
7-inch: A&M / AMS 7402 (UK)

1. "So Lonely" – 3:10
2. "No Time This Time" – 3:30

== Personnel ==
- Sting – vocals, bass
- Andy Summers – guitars
- Stewart Copeland – drums

== Charts ==
Chart (1979–1980)	Peak position
Australia (Kent Music Report)	99
Ireland (IRMA)	7
Netherlands (Dutch Top 40)	31
Netherlands (Single Top 100)	26
UK Singles (Official Charts)	6

Chart (2013)	Peak position
France (SNEP)	133

== Certifications ==
Region	Certification	Certified units/sales
New Zealand (RMNZ)	Gold	15,000^{‡}
Spain (Promusicae)	Gold	30,000^{‡}
United Kingdom (BPI)	Silver	250,000^{^}
^{^} Shipments figures based on certification alone.^{‡} Sales+streaming figures based on certification alone.

== Cover versions ==
The song has been covered many times, including by Limbeck on the album ¡Policia!: A Tribute to the Police (2005).
