= Walking on the Moon =

1979 single by the Police

Single by the Police

from the album Reggatta de Blanc
- B-side: "Visions of the Night"
- Released: 23 November 1979
- Recorded: 1979
- Genre: Reggae rock; psychedelic rock; dub; new wave
- Length: 4:59 (album version); 3:59 (single version)
- Label: A&M
- Songwriter: Sting
- Producers: Nigel Gray; The Police

The Police singles chronology
"Message in a Bottle" (1979)	"Walking on the Moon" (1979)	"Bring On the Night" (1979)

Alternative cover
- French 7-inch single cover

Audio sample
- file; help

Music video
- "Walking on the Moon" on YouTube

"Walking on the Moon" is a reggae song by British rock band the Police, released on 23 November 1979 as the second single from their second studio album, Reggatta de Blanc (1979). The song was written by the band's lead vocalist and bassist Sting. It went on to become the band's second No. 1 hit in the UK.

== Background ==
Sting has said that he wrote the song when he was drunk one night after a concert in Munich. The following morning, he remembered the song and wrote it down.

I was drunk in a hotel room in Munich, slumped on the bed with the whirling pit when this riff came into my head. I got up and started walking round the room, singing 'Walking round the room, ya, ya, walking round the room'. That was all. In the cool light of morning I remembered what had happened and I wrote the riff down. But 'Walking Round the Room' was a stupid title so I thought of something even more stupid which was 'Walking on the Moon'.

— Sting, L'Historia Bandido, 1981

In his autobiography, Sting implies that the song was partially inspired by an early girlfriend:

Deborah Anderson was my first real girlfriend...walking back from Deborah's house in those early days would eventually become a song, for being in love is to be relieved of gravity.

— Sting, 2003

According to Sting, the song was originally recorded "as a rocker" in early versions, but it was reworked. The riff, which is played on the bass, was described as "weird" and "jazzy" by Sting. Guitarist Andy Summers came up with the chord "which hits after the bass notes" throughout the song.

"Walking on the Moon" was released as the follow-up single to the British No. 1 single "Message in a Bottle" in late 1979. The song was the Police's second number-one hit single in the United Kingdom. It also reached No. 1 in Ireland and No. 9 in Australia, but did not chart in the United States.

The B-side to the song, "Visions of the Night", was written by Sting. He said of the song, "This was the first song I wrote after going to London. It was hard to be serious about the whole thing. I was bemused, much to Stewart [Copeland]'s disgust." According to Copeland, the song was "too cerebral for [the band's] early audiences," so Sting would call it "Three O'Clock Shit", the title of a rejected Police song that appears as "Three O'Clock Shot" on Strontium 90: Police Academy.

== Composition ==
"Walking on the Moon" has a "sparse" arrangement, centred around a three-note bass riff. It is one of the Police's more reggae-influenced songs.

== Personnel ==
- Sting – vocals, bass guitar
- Andy Summers – guitar, guitar synthesiser
- Stewart Copeland – drums

== Music video ==
The video was shot at the Kennedy Space Center in Florida on October 23, 1979. It features the band miming to the track amidst spacecraft displays, interspersed with NASA footage. Sting plays a guitar rather than a bass, while Stewart Copeland strikes his drumsticks on a Saturn V moon rocket. The video was directed by Derek Burbidge.

== Track listing ==
7" A&M / AMS 7494 (UK)

1. "Walking on the Moon" (Edit) – 3:59 (This edit has never been officially released on CD.)
2. "Visions of the Night" – 3:05

12" A&M / AMSP 7494 (UK)

1. "Walking on the Moon" – 4:59
2. "Visions of the Night" – 3:05

== Charts ==
=== Weekly charts ===
Weekly chart performance for "Walking on the Moon"
Chart (1979–1980)	Peak position
Australia (Kent Music Report)	9
Belgium (Ultratop 50 Flanders)	16
Canada Top Singles (RPM)	65
France (SNEP)	9
Ireland (IRMA)	1
Netherlands (Dutch Top 40)	9
Netherlands (Single Top 100)	8
New Zealand (Recorded Music NZ)	12
Spain (Promusicae)	20
UK Singles (Official Charts)	1

=== Year-end charts ===
Year-end chart performance for "Walking on the Moon"
Chart (1980)	Position
Australia (Kent Music Report)	79

== Certifications ==
Certifications for "Walking on the Moon"
Region	Certification	Certified units/sales
France	—	300,000
New Zealand (RMNZ)	Platinum	30,000^{‡}
United Kingdom (BPI)	Gold	500,000^{^}
^{^} Shipments figures based on certification alone.^{‡} Sales+streaming figures based on certification alone.
