= Can't Stand Losing You =

Single by the Police

from the album Outlandos d'Amour
- B-side: "Dead End Job"
- Released: 8 September 1978
- Genre: Reggae rock; new wave
- Length: 2:58
- Label: A&M
- Songwriter: Sting
- Producer: The Police

The Police singles chronology
"Roxanne" (1978)	"Can't Stand Losing You" (1978)	"So Lonely" (1978)

Alternative cover
- NL 7-inch cover

Music video
- "Can't Stand Losing You" on YouTube

"Can't Stand Losing You" is a song by the British rock band the Police, released on 8 September 1978 from their debut album Outlandos d'Amour. The song was also released as the follow-up single to "Roxanne", reaching number 2 in the UK Singles Chart after a re-release on 22 June 1979. It was written by the band's lead singer and bassist Sting as a song about suicide.

== Composition ==
"Can't Stand Losing You" features lyrics which, according to Sting, is "about a teenage suicide, which is always a bit of a joke." Sting also claimed that the lyrics took him only five minutes to write. The song is musically similar to "Roxanne", with both songs bearing a reggae influence and a rock chorus. The song also makes use of the Echoplex delay unit. Sting sings lead vocals on the song, which he described as "up and down, strange, high-pitched singing."

"Dead End Job", the B-side of "Can't Stand Losing You", is based on a riff Copeland wrote in high school. Sting's lyrics describe being a teacher (which he was, before joining the Police) as a dead-end job. "Dead End Job" was available only on vinyl until the release of 1993's Message in a Box.

== Reception ==
Cash Box praised the power of the refrain and said that "the vocals easily match the energy of the three-piece instrumentals."

== Commercial performance ==
The original single capped at number 42 in late 1978, but the 22 June 1979 reissue nearly topped the UK Singles charts. "Can't Stand Losing You" also appeared on the UK singles charts in 1980, as part of the Six Pack singles compilation set. The package (consisting of six 7-inch vinyl singles) peaked at number 17 on the UK charts in June 1980. In 1995, a live version of the song was released as a single and reached number 27 on the UK charts.

== Controversy ==
The original single was banned by the BBC because of the controversial cover (an alternative cover was released in some places). As Sting described: "The reason they [the BBC] had a problem with "Can't Stand Losing You" was because the photo on the cover of the single had Stewart standing on a block of ice with a noose around his neck, waiting for the ice to melt." It became the group's first single to break the charts, and has held a spot in their live sets ever since it was written. The photography on the controversial cover was by Peter Gravelle.

== Live performances ==
The instrumental track "Reggatta de Blanc" from the album of the same name originated from an improvisational stage jam played during live performances of "Can't Stand Losing You". This instrumental track went on to win the Grammy Award for Best Rock Instrumental Performance in 1981.

The Police performed the song on the BBC2 television show The Old Grey Whistle Test in 1978, which was their first performance on television. Sting wore a pair of oversized sunglasses as a result of a mishap with a can of hairspray during makeup, which required a trip to the hospital.

== Music videos ==
Two music videos exist for the song. One features the group playing the song on a stage with Sting wearing huge glasses. (This was done around the same times as the Message in a Bottle video as the band are wearing the same clothing). Slow motion shots of the group live appear as well. The second features the group performing the song in front of a red backdrop, which was filmed on the same day as the red-backdropped video for "Roxanne".

== Personnel ==
- Sting – bass, vocals
- Andy Summers – guitar
- Stewart Copeland – drums

== Chart performance ==
=== Weekly charts ===
Chart (1978)	Peak position
UK Singles (Official Charts)	42

Chart (1979)	Peak position
Australia (Kent Music Report)	98
Belgium (Ultratop 50 Flanders)	15
Ireland (IRMA)	7
Netherlands (Dutch Top 40)	9
Netherlands (Single Top 100)	10
New Zealand (Recorded Music NZ)	48
UK Singles (Official Charts)	2

=== Year-end charts ===
Chart (1979)	Rank
Netherlands (Dutch Top 40)	75
Netherlands (Single Top 100)	94

== Certifications ==
Region	Certification	Certified units/sales
New Zealand (RMNZ)	Gold	15,000^{‡}
^{‡} Sales+streaming figures based on certification alone.
