= Message in a Bottle (The Police song) =

1979 single by the Police

- Standard European artwork

Single by the Police

from the album Reggatta de Blanc
- B-side: "Landlord"
- Released: 14 September 1979
- Recorded: February 1979
- Genre: Reggae rock; new wave; ska; pop
- Length: 3:50 (single version); 4:51 (album version)
- Label: A&M
- Songwriter: Sting
- Producers: Nigel Gray; The Police

The Police singles chronology
"So Lonely" (1978)	"Message in a Bottle" (1979)	"Walking on the Moon" (1979)

Music video
- "Message in a Bottle" on YouTube

"Message in a Bottle" is a song by British rock band the Police. It was released on 14 September 1979 as the lead single from their second studio album, Reggatta de Blanc (1979). Written by the band's lead singer and bassist Sting, the song is ostensibly about a story of a castaway on an island who sends out a message in a bottle to seek love. Having received no response for a year, he despairs, believing that he is destined to be alone. The next day, however, he sees "a hundred billion bottles" on the shore and realizes that there are more lonely people like him.

The song was the first of the five UK number one singles released by the Police. Rolling Stone ranked it number 65 on its list of the "100 Greatest Guitar Songs of All Time".

== Composition ==
The song exemplifies the reggae rock/new wave style of early Police. It starts in the key of C♯ minor with a chord progression of C#m9–Amaj9–B7–F#m, but modulates to the key of A major for the chorus.

According to the band's guitarist Andy Summers, Sting wrote the central guitar riff for "Message in a Bottle" but initially wanted it for a different song. Summers said to L'Historia Bandidio in 1981: "Sting had that riff for a while, but there was another tune with it originally. He'd been fiddling about with it during our first American tour. Finally, he rearranged the riff slightly and came up with the song." Summers came up with, as Sting described, "lovely arpeggiated shiver" during the break prior to the third verse. Sting praised this addition saying, "He'd [Summers] do that – the song would be quite raw and he'd just add these lovely colours." The riff in its final form is built of multiple overdubbed guitar parts, played by Summers. Following the main progression of the song, one part features Summers playing a three note figure featuring the root, fifth, and ninth of each chord in succession. A second guitar part plays the identical rhythm with different harmony notes, adding minor or major thirds to each chord, as well as additional extensions such as eleventh and thirteenth notes.

The song was recorded at Surrey Sound Studios as part of the sessions for the Reggatta de Blanc album. Stewart Copeland's drumming, praised as his "finest drum track" by Summers, was "overdubbed [from] about six different parts."

The theme of the song is "universality of desired connection." The lyrics depict a castaway longing for someone to listen to him who then discovers many messages from others washing up on his shore.

The song's B-side, "Landlord", was written by Sting (lyrics) and Copeland (music). Sting said of its inspiration, "I wrote that after Frances and I were thrown out of the house we were renting in London. I hated the idea of somebody fucking my life up like that. Stewart [Copeland] wrote the music." The song originally featured lyrics by Copeland, but they were replaced by Sting's.

== Live performances ==
The Police debuted the song on live television on the BBC's Rock Goes to College, filmed at Hatfield Polytechnic College in Hertfordshire, England. The Police donated all money earned from the show to the college.

The Police performed at Live Earth, a 2007 charity concert to raise awareness of global warming and other environmental hazards, and performed "Message in a Bottle" as the US finale, with John Mayer playing guitar with Andy Summers and Kanye West performing a rap verse over the chorus of the song.

Sting performed the song on January 30, 2025 at Intuit Dome in Inglewood, California for FireAid to help with relief efforts for the January 2025 Southern California wildfires.

== Release ==
The song was released as the first single from Reggatta de Blanc on 14 September 1979. The song was a massive success in Britain, becoming the Police's first No. 1 hit in the UK Singles Chart. The song also topped the charts in Ireland and reached No. 5 in Australia. Despite its popularity in the UK, the single only reached No. 74 in the United States. An alternative "classic rock" mix is available on Every Breath You Take: The Classics.

"Message in a Bottle" is also a personal favourite of the members of the band. In addition to saying it was his favourite song in an interview with Jools Holland of the BBC, Sting described it as a "good song", and also said that he was "very proud" of it. Copeland said it was "one of our best moments in the studio and always great on stage." Summers described the track as a personal favourite in his book One Train Later, and said, "For me, it's still the best song Sting ever came up with and the best Police track."

'Message in a Bottle' is a good song. That can move me. I like the idea that while it's about loneliness and alienation it's also about finding solace and other people going through the same thing. The guy's on a desert island and throws a bottle out to sea saying he's alone and all these millions of bottles come back saying, So what So am I! I like the fact that the whole deal is clinched by the third verse. It makes a journey.

— Sting, Q, November 1993

== Critical reception ==
Billboard characterised "Message in a Bottle" as a "reggae-tinged rock song" with an "irresistible" hook. Cash Box described the song's hook as "a mesmerizing guitar figure" that is similar to that of Blue Öyster Cult's "Don't Fear the Reaper." Record World said that "sharp tempo contrasts are bridged by Andy Summers' hard-edged lead guitar while singer-songwriter Sting pleads an affecting lead vocal." Ultimate Classic Rock critic Mike Duquette rated it as the Police's best song, praising the "foolishly simple guitar riff devised by Sting but played to perfection by Summers" the "cacophony of percussive brilliance by Copeland" and "Sting’s most plainspoken and razor-sharp lyric."

== Track listing ==
A&M / AMS 7474

1. "Message in a Bottle" (edit) – 3:50 (This edit has yet to appear on CD anywhere)
2. "Landlord" – 3:09

== Personnel ==
The album credits simply state: "All noises by the Police. All arrangements by the Police." On Tidal, the credits are given as the following:

- Sting – bass guitar, vocals, songwriting
- Stewart Copeland – drums, percussion
- Andy Summers – guitar

== Chart performance ==
=== Weekly charts ===
Chart (1979–1980)	Peak position
Australia (Kent Music Report)	5
Austria (Ö3 Austria Top 40)	24
Belgium (Ultratop 50 Flanders)	5
Canada Top Singles (RPM)	2
France (SNEP)	3
Germany (GfK)	35
Ireland (IRMA)	1
Italy (Musica e dischi)	21
Netherlands (Dutch Top 40)	2
Netherlands (Single Top 100)	4
New Zealand (Recorded Music NZ)	11
Spain (AFE)	1
Sweden (Sverigetopplistan)	20
UK Singles (Official Charts)	1
US Billboard Hot 100	74
US Cash Box Top 100	62

=== Year-end charts ===
Chart (1979)	Rank
Belgium	53
Netherlands (Dutch Top 40)	37
UK	11

Chart (1980)	Rank
Australia (Kent Music Report)	40
Canada	34
France	19
Italy	80
Spain (AFE)	6

=== Decade-end charts ===
Chart (1980)	Rank
UK Singles (Official Charts Company)	83

== Certifications ==
Region	Certification	Certified units/sales
France (SNEP)	Gold	500,000^{*}
Italy (FIMI) sales since 2009	Platinum	100,000^{‡}
New Zealand (RMNZ)	3× Platinum	90,000^{‡}
Spain	—	25,000
Spain (Promusicae) Digital release	Platinum	60,000^{‡}
United Kingdom (BPI)	Platinum	1,000,000^{‡}
^{*} Sales figures based on certification alone.^{‡} Sales+streaming figures based on certification alone.

== Covers ==
- In 1999, American Alternative metal band Machine Head covered the song on their album "The Burning Red".
- In 2003, American Hi-Fi covered the song on the soundtrack album for the film Rugrats Go Wild.
- In 2006, FilterFunk (better known as Sander van Doorn) covered the song, titled S.O.S. (Message in a Bottle), and was edited by Hi_Tack.
- In 2020, Sting recorded a version of the song with the quartet All Saints.
