= Roxanne (The Police song) =

1978 single by the Police

- Original 1978 UK sleeve

Single by the Police

from the album Outlandos d'Amour
- B-side: "Peanuts"
- Released: 14 April 1978
- Genre: Reggae rock; new wave
- Length: 3:12
- Label: A&M
- Songwriter: Sting
- Producer: The Police

The Police singles chronology
| "Fall Out" (1977) | "Roxanne" (1978) | "Can't Stand Losing You" (1978) |

Sting singles chronology
| "I'm So Happy I Can't Stop Crying (with Toby Keith)" (1997) | "Roxanne '97" (1997) | "Brand New Day" (1999) |

Alternative cover
- UK 1979 reissue

Audio sample
- file; help

Music video
- "Roxanne" on YouTube

"Roxanne" is a song by the English rock band the Police. The song was written by lead singer and bassist Sting and was released as a single on 14 April 1978, in advance of their debut album Outlandos d'Amour, released on 17 November. It was written from the point of view of a man who falls in love with a prostitute. When re-released on 12 April 1979, the song peaked at No. 12 on the UK Singles Chart. "Roxanne" is also their second single to be released and their first single on A&M Records.

The song ranked No. 388 on the Rolling Stone's "500 Greatest Songs of All Time" and was voted No. 85 by VH1 on its list of the "100 Greatest Rock Songs".

"Roxanne" was the first song the band performed live at the 2007 Grammy Awards to kick off their 30th Anniversary Reunion Tour. In 2008, "Roxanne" was inducted into the Grammy Hall of Fame.

== Background ==
Police lead singer Sting wrote the song inspired by the prostitutes he saw near the band's seedy hotel in Paris, France, where the Police were lodged in October 1977 to perform at the Nashville Club. The song's title comes from the name of the character in the play Cyrano de Bergerac, an old poster of which was hanging in the hotel foyer.

Sting had conceived the song as a bossa nova, although he credits Police drummer Stewart Copeland for suggesting its final rhythmic form as a tango. During recording, Sting accidentally sat down on a piano keyboard in the studio, resulting in the atonal piano chord and laughter preserved at the beginning of the track. The Police were initially indifferent about the song, but Miles Copeland III was immediately enthusiastic after hearing it; he became their manager and got them their first record deal with A&M Records.

We went into Surrey Sound Studios and it was working pretty well. We recorded a few tracks, one of which I wrote more or less as a throwaway. That was 'Roxanne', I didn't think much more about it until we played the album to Miles Copeland who is, of course, Stewart's brother and a bit of an entrepreneur, though he'd never been particularly interested in the Police. In fact, he'd kept away from it to say the least. He did come along to the sessions while we were putting the first album together but more or less just to offer brotherly advice to Stewart. He heard the album and quite liked it. When we got to Roxanne, we were a bit embarrassed because the song was a bit of an anachronism, because compared with our usual material it was slow, quiet and melodic. Far from saying he thought it was a piece of shit, he said it was amazing. I thought, 'He likes this song. This is fantastic!'

— Sting, A Visual Documentary, 1978

According to Andy Summers:

Sting played it for me in my living room early on. He was very shy at first bringing in his songs. But it was brilliant, and later on we all worked it out in a damp basement in North London. I remember Stewart telling Sting where to place the bass notes, which was a bit tricky. Miles Copeland came down to hear us and we were kind of embarrassed to play it for him, because Miles had blinders on and was into fast and furious punk. But much to his credit, he said, 'This is great, a knockout!' I was really surprised. And he took it to A&M and got a contract for one single. I don't think it ever broke the Top 40 in America, but eventually it became the Police signature tune.

— Andy Summers, Guitar World, 1/94

== Release ==
"Roxanne" became the band's debut single for A&M Records. However, despite the praise given by Miles Copeland, the single did not chart upon its initial release. Writing in Record Mirror, singles reviewer Bev Briggs declared "This must be the big breaker for the Police .... what the hell, go out and buy it immediately".

The band released two further singles in the UK that year: "Can't Stand Losing You", which charted at number 42, and "So Lonely", which did not chart. Then, in early 1979, "Roxanne" was issued in North America as the group's first single there. In the US, "Roxanne" entered the Billboard Hot 100 in February 1979 and peaked at No. 32 in April. In Canada, the single peaked one rung higher on the charts at No. 31. Cash Box said it has "fast slashing rhythm guitar work, spacious arrangement and good singing." The Fort Worth Star Telegram rated it the 5th-best single of 1979.

The song's international success spurred a UK re-release of "Roxanne" on 12 April 1979, which reached No. 12 in the UK Singles Chart. A live solo version performed by Sting from the 1982 album The Secret Policeman's Other Ball received moderate airplay on album-oriented rock radio and reached No. 28 on the Billboard Top Tracks chart. The song went on to become a staple of Sting's performances during his solo career, and The Police performed it when they reunited in 2003 for their induction into the Rock and Roll Hall of Fame.

In 1997, "Roxanne" was remixed by American rapper and producer Puff Daddy for the compilation The Very Best of Sting & The Police. The remix, titled "Roxanne '97", featured raps from Pras and samples from UTFO's "Roxanne, Roxanne". "Roxanne '97" was released on 8 December 1997 and peaked at No. 17 on the UK Singles Chart and at No. 59 on the Billboard Hot 100.

== Acclaim ==
"Roxanne" has appeared on all of the Police's greatest hits albums. In 2004, Rolling Stone ranked it No. 388 on its list of the 500 Greatest Songs of All Time.

In 2000, VH1 ranked the song No. 85 on its list of the "100 Greatest Rock Songs", then in 2003 ranked it No. 90 on their list of the "100 Greatest Songs of the Past 25 years". It is one of The Rock and Roll Hall of Fame's 500 Songs that Shaped Rock and Roll. In 2008, "Roxanne" was inducted into the Grammy Hall of Fame.

== Track listing ==
=== 7-inch: A&M / AMS 7348 (UK) ===
1. "Roxanne" – 3:00 (Sting)
2. "Peanuts" (single edit) – 2:52 (Stewart Copeland, Sting)

== Personnel ==
- Sting – bass, vocals, piano
- Andy Summers – guitar
- Stewart Copeland – drums

== Charts ==
=== Weekly charts ===
1979–1980 weekly chart performance for "Roxanne"
| Chart (1979–1980) | Peak position |
|---|---|
| Australia (Kent Music Report) | 34 |
| Canada Top Singles (RPM) | 31 |
| Ireland (IRMA) | 22 |
| Netherlands (Dutch Top 40) | 21 |
| Netherlands (Single Top 100) | 19 |
| New Zealand (Recorded Music NZ) | 8 |
| UK Singles (Official Charts) | 12 |
| US Billboard Hot 100 | 32 |
| US Cash Box | 31 |
| US Record World | 39 |

1982 weekly chart performance for "Roxanne"
| Chart (1982) | Peak position |
|---|---|
| US Billboard Top Tracks | 28 |

1997–1998 weekly chart performance for "Roxanne '97" (Puff Daddy Remix)
| Chart (1997–1998) | Peak position |
|---|---|
| Belgium (Ultratip Bubbling Under Flanders) | 19 |
| Netherlands (Dutch Top 40) | 38 |
| Netherlands (Single Top 100) | 69 |
| UK Singles (Official Charts) | 17 |
| UK Airplay (Music Week) | 37 |
| US Billboard Hot 100 | 59 |

2012 weekly chart performance for "Roxanne"
| Chart (2012) | Peak position |
|---|---|
| France (SNEP) | 195 |

=== Year-end charts ===
1979 year-end chart performance for "Roxanne"
| Chart (1979) | Position |
|---|---|
| Canada (RPM) | 195 |
| New Zealand (RIANZ) | 43 |

== Certifications ==
| Region | Certification | Certified units/sales |
|---|---|---|
| Denmark (IFPI Danmark) | Gold | 45,000^{‡} |
| France | — | 300,000 |
| Germany (BVMI) | Gold | 300,000^{‡} |
| Italy (FIMI) Since 2009 | Platinum | 100,000^{‡} |
| New Zealand (RMNZ) | 4× Platinum | 120,000^{‡} |
| Spain (Promusicae) | Platinum | 60,000^{‡} |
| United Kingdom (BPI) | 2× Platinum | 1,200,000^{‡} |
^{‡} Sales+streaming figures based on certification alone.

== Cover versions ==
In 1999, English singer-songwriter George Michael covered the song for his fourth solo studio album, Songs from the Last Century. In 2006, singer Dilana performed "Roxanne" on the CBS reality television show Rock Star: Supernova and subsequently released the cover as a single. In 2012, the song was covered by singer Juliet Simms for the reality television show The Voice. Her cover reached No. 86 on the Billboard Hot 100.

=== "El Tango de Roxanne" ===
For the 2001 jukebox musical romantic drama film Moulin Rouge! directed, produced, and co-written by Baz Luhrmann, the song "El Tango de Roxanne" was composed as a fusion of "Roxanne" with "Tanguera" by Mariano Mores. The message is, as stated by one character: "Never fall in love with a woman who sells herself." The song was performed by Jacek Koman, Ewan McGregor, Nicole Kidman, and José Feliciano. In the film, the song shows a combination of locations, memories and characters, anchored by the ensemble cast dancing tango.

=== "Redlight" by Swedish House Mafia ===
In 2022, the song was interpolated by lead singer Sting and Swedish house music supergroup Swedish House Mafia as "Redlight". It was released on 25 February 2022 as the fourth single from the group's debut studio album Paradise Again.

== Bibliography ==
- Clarkson, Wensley (1996). Sting: The Secret Life of Gordon Sumner. Blake. ISBN 9781857821253.
