= Nigel Gray =

English record producer (1947–2016)

Nigel Gray (1947 – 30 July 2016) was an English record producer. His album credits include Outlandos d'Amour (1978), Reggatta de Blanc (1979), and Zenyatta Mondatta (1980) for the Police, Kaleidoscope (1980) and Juju (1981) for Siouxsie and the Banshees, as well as five albums for Godley & Creme.

Gray was nominated for a Grammy Award for Best Engineered Album (1981) for Zenyatta Mondatta, and also won two Grammys for producer of Best Rock Performance ("Don't Stand So Close to Me") and Best Rock Instrumental ("Behind My Camel").

Gray was revered by Radiohead's producer Nigel Godrich for his work on the Police's Reggatta de Blanc. Gray's production on Siouxsie and the Banshees' records with guitarist John McGeoch was also a reference for Godrich during the recording of Radiohead's "There There".

== Surrey Sound Studios ==
=== 1975–1987 ===
In 1975, Gray converted a co-operative hall building on Kingston Road, Leatherhead, in southern England, into a four-track recording studio named Surrey Sound Studios, on a budget of £1,200, with his brother Chris Gray as engineer. Initially it was used as a rehearsal space and a demoing facility.

In 1977, the studio became 16-track, housing an Ampex MM1000 16-track tape machine and an Alice desk. Amongst others The Police recorded their first album Outlandos d'Amour there using this setup.

In 1978, during the recording of Godley & Creme's L album (the first in a string of five albums that the duo made there), the studio had upgraded again to 24-track with an all-MCI setup (which also included a fully-automated JH-400B console). Other artists such as the Police and Siouxsie and the Banshees recorded albums there. Singles from the Lotus Eaters and Latin Quarter made the UK Singles Chart. Other albums included Slow Crimes by the Work, and those by The Professionals, Girlschool, Tank, Hazel O'Connor and Eurogliders.

In 1983, the studio underwent further refurbishment for two months, reopening with a newly-installed Harrison MR4 console, Otari MTR-90 tape machines (24-track and 2-track) and Sony tape decks and digital recorders.

In 1987, Gray sold his studio and retired to Cornwall. His last project was the production of the album Universal Sky, the third by local band the Viewers.

His younger son Tom is a well-known British luthier, under the name Gray Guitars.

=== 1980–1981 ===
In 1980, Gray began running his own record label, Surrey Sound Records. The label issued 7 singles in late 1980 and early 1981, none of which charted. Surrey Sound Records closed by the end of 1981.

== Death ==
On 31 July 2016, the members of the Police, Sting, Andy Summers and Stewart Copeland, reacted on a social network to Gray's death, writing: "Nigel Gray recorded the first three Police albums, the first two in his converted studio above a dairy in Leatherhead in Surrey. Nigel was a qualified medical doctor who followed his passion into music and was able to use his kindly bedside manner to coax three extraordinarily successful records from a band operating at the time on the tiniest of shoestring budgets. We simply couldn't have done it without him, that's the truth".

== Collaborators ==
Artists for whom Nigel Gray produced or engineered include:

- Simon Ådahl
- Alternative TV
- Code Blue
- Paul Brady
- England
- The Escape
- Eurogliders
- Girlschool
- Godley & Creme
- Klark Kent, a pseudonym of Stewart Copeland
- Sonja Kristina
- Lotus Eaters
- Craig McNeil
- Hazel O'Connor
- The Passions
- The Planets
- Charlie Peacock
- The Police
- Polyphonic Size
- The Professionals
- Siouxsie and the Banshees
- Glacier Georges
- Tank
- The Viewers
- Wishbone Ash
- The Work
- Two People
