= Sparks (Fiction Plane album) =

Studio album by Fiction Plane
- Released: 10 May 2010 (continental Europe only)
- Genre: Alternative rock, indie rock
- Length: 58:57
- Label: Roadrunner Records
- Producer: Fiction Plane

Fiction Plane chronology
Paradiso (2009)	Sparks (2010)	Mondo Lumina (2015)

Sparks is the third full-length studio album by rock band Fiction Plane. It was released in continental Europe (excluding the UK) on 10 May 2010 via Roadrunner Records. Two versions of the album exist: a standard 11-song version, and a deluxe digipack edition featuring 14 songs. The album artwork was once again provided by Alex Lake, who previously contributed the art for Bitter Forces and Lame Race Horses, Left Side of the Brain, and Paradiso. Sparks was only available in stores in continental Europe and at European online retailers.

Sparks was recorded at RAK Studios in London (in February/March 2009) and at Moles Studios in Bath, England (in September 2009). It was mixed and engineered by Paul Corkett. The bonus track "Sadr City Blues (acoustic)" was recorded at Airtime Studios in Bloomington, Indiana. The album's first single, "Push Me Around", was released in Europe on 4 April 2010. A video for the track was also filmed, but has not yet premiered.

The lead track "You Know You're Good (La La La Song)" is a reworking of the song "Cut Your Brakes". The band wrote the song during The Police 30th Anniversary Tour (2007) and it evolved over time to its current incarnation. The only released recording of "Cut Your Breaks" appeared on Fiction Plane's live album Paradiso. "Russian LSD" is based on the 1966 Russian novel The Master and Margarita, by Mikhail Bulgakov. The novel tells the story about what happens when the Devil pays a visit to a Soviet Union that is largely composed of atheists. "Humanoid" was inspired by the short story "The Secret Life of Walter Mitty", by James Thurber. "Sadr City Blues (acoustic)" was recorded in August 2008 and was intended to be on an acoustic EP the band hoped to release that Christmas. However, due to legal issues and problems with the previous record label, the EP was never released.

== Track listing ==
No.	Title	Length
1.	"You Know You're Good (La La La Song)"	3:08
2.	"Out of My Face"	4:00
3.	"Push Me Around"	4:00
4.	"Talking"	2:54
5.	"Revenge"	3:01
6.	"Two Sparks"	3:12
7.	"Tommy"	4:39
8.	"Humanoid"	5:05
9.	"Zero"	4:37
10.	"Russian LSD"	5:59
11.	"Denied"	4:38

Special Edition bonus tracks
No.	Title	Length
12.	"Angel Eyes"	4:18
13.	"Telephone Unknown"	3:49
14.	"Sadr City Blues" (Acoustic)	5:38

== Personnel ==
Fiction Plane

- Joe Sumner – vocals, bass
- Seton Daunt – guitar
- Pete Wilhoit – drums

Technical personnel

- Fiction Plane – production
- Paul Corkett – engineering, mixing
- Paul Lamalfa – engineering
- Donal Hodgson – vocal engineering
- Helen Atkinson – assistant, Pro-Tools
- Nick Jopling – assistant, Pro-Tools
- Robbie Nelson – assistant, Pro-Tools
- Brian "Big Bass" Gardner – mastering
- Daniel Regan – management

== Charts ==
Chart (2010)	Peak position
Dutch Albums (Album Top 100)	22
French Albums (SNEP)	147
