= Pete Wilhoit =

American drummer

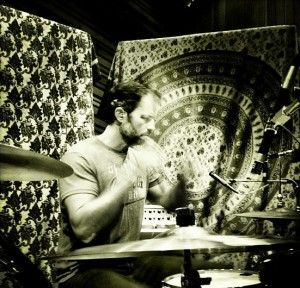
- Henson Studios, Hollywood, California

Background information
- Born: December 8, 1971 (age 54); Bloomington, Indiana, U.S.
- Genres: Rock, jazz
- Occupation: Musician
- Instrument: Drums
- Years active: 1989–present
- Labels: BMG, MCA, Bieler Bros., Roadrunner, Rhyme & Reason
- Member of: Fiction Plane
- Formerly of: The Cutters
- Website: www.petewilhoit.com

Pete Wilhoit is an American drummer and a member of the band Fiction Plane.

== Musical career ==
Wilhoit grew up Bloomington, Indiana and attended Indiana University, where he studied jazz and percussion. His teachers included David Baker, Shawn Pelton, and Kenny Aronoff. In 1991, he started his first band, The Cutters, with friends from Bloomington. The band was signed to BMG, lasted for eleven years, and released two albums and two EPs. He was also a session musician during this time and contributed to over thirty albums by other musicians.

In 2003, Wilhoit drove from Indiana to New York City to audition for the band Fiction Plane, which impressed Joe Sumner, the band's founder, lead singer, and bassist, who hired him. Fiction Plane toured with Sting in 2005, and in 2007 became the opening band for The Police Reunion Tour.,

Wilhoit has also played or recorded with Mike Doughty, Sharon Corr, Ari Hest, Declan O'Rourke, Carrie Newcomer, Laura Critchley, Michael McDonald, Bob Dorough, Michael Brunnock, and I Blame Coco.

== Discography ==
=== With Fiction Plane ===
- Everything Will Never Be OK (MCA, 2003 )
- Bitter Forces and Lame Race Horses (Everybody's, 2005)
- Left Side of the Brain (Bieler Bros., 2007)
- Paradiso (2009)
- Sparks (Roadrunner, 2010)
- Mondo Lumina (Rhyme & Reason, 2015)

=== Other ===
- 1995 The Cutters – The Cutters
- 1997 Indianapolis Intergalactic Spaceport – Beeble Brox
- 1998 Sonic Wave Love – The Cutters
- 1998 3rd Man – 3rd Man
- 1999 Squall – Kevin McCormick
- 2000 Flypaper Highway – The Cutters
- 2001 Window on the Soul – Craig Brenner
- 2002 Flamingo – Simon Rowe
- 2003 Ballads for a Rainy Afternoon – Bob Williams
- 2007 Cover Their Eyes – Krista Detor
- 2007 What Have You Gone and Done? – Monika Herzig
- 2009 New Reality – Rudie Kay
- 2010 Picturesque – Chase Coy
- 2014 Flat Earth Diary – Krista Detor
- 2014 Live at Ken's House – Mike Doughty
- 2014 Stellar Motel – Mike Doughty
