= Two Sisters (Fiction Plane song) =

Single by Fiction Plane

from the album Left Side of the Brain
- Released: 22 May 2007
- Recorded: 2007
- Genre: Alternative rock
- Label: Bieler Bros. Records
- Songwriter: Joe Sumner
- Producer: Paul Corkett

Fiction Plane singles chronology
"Hate" (2003)	"Two Sisters" (2007)

"Two Sisters" is a song by British rock band Fiction Plane. It was released on 22 May 2007 as the lead single from their second studio album, Left Side of the Brain (2007). The song was written by Joe Sumner.

== Charts ==
Chart (2007)	Peak position
Belgium (Ultratip Bubbling Under Flanders)	4
Netherlands (Single Top 100)	25
