= Joe Sumner =

English singer-songwriter (born 1976)

- Sumner performing with Fiction Plane in 2026

Background information
- Born: Joseph Sumner; 23 November 1976 (age 49)
- Origin: London, England
- Genres: Rock; pop
- Occupations: Singer; songwriter; musician
- Instruments: Vocals; bass guitar
- Years active: 1999–present

Joseph Sumner (born 23 November 1976) is an English singer-songwriter, vocalist, and bassist. He is the frontman and a founding member of the rock band Fiction Plane, with whom he has released six studio albums, and has pursued a parallel solo career, releasing his debut solo album Sunshine in the Night in 2023. He is also co-founder of Vyclone, a company that developed a multi-angle video recording application.

== Career ==
=== Music ===
Sumner in 2007 performing for band Fiction Plane

Sumner learned to play guitar and drums when he was a teenager, and was inspired to write songs when he heard Nirvana's album Nevermind. He formed a band with a school friend, bassist Dan Brown, which eventually became Fiction Plane when it was joined by British guitarist Seton Daunt.

Fiction Plane recorded its first album, Everything Will Never Be OK (2003), without a full-time drummer, relying instead on session musician Abe Laboriel Jr. Soon after, Fiction Plane hired drummer Pete Wilhoit, a native of Indiana.

After that album, Fiction Plane released Bitter Forces and Lame Race Horses (2005), Left Side of the Brain (2007), Paradiso (2009), Sparks (2010), and Mondo Lumina (2015). The band received much attention when it was the opening act for The Police's reunion tour in 2007.

In 2019, he released a self-titled album with the band The Euphoriants, which included Scrote and Blair Sinta. They received a good amount of airplay for their single, "Colorful Crimes."

Sumner in 2026

In 2020, Sumner's song "Hope" was performed by a collective of vocalists as part of a voter registration campaign in support of the Biden/Harris ticket. He subsequently released the solo singles "You You You" (2021) and "Looking for Me Looking for You" (2022). In 2023, he released his debut solo album, Sunshine in the Night, marking a significant expansion of his work beyond Fiction Plane.Benitez-Eves, Tina (11 October 2023). "Joe Sumner Laces Love, Light, and Family Ties on Solo Debut 'Sunshine In the Night'". American Songwriter. LifeMinute.tv Team (29 September 2023). "Joe Sumner Releases First Full-Length Solo Album Sunshine in the Night". LifeMinute.tv.

=== Entrepreneur ===
In 2010, the day after performing a concert, Sumner found videos of the show on YouTube that fans had filmed with their smartphones. Speculating that fans' clips could be linked into an interesting compilation, he co-founded the company Vyclone with David King Lassman to create a product of the same name.

The app united social media with individual video recording. Several people could film an event simultaneously with their smartphones, then upload their clips with Vyclone software, which assembles the clips into a movie shown from multiple angles. The app invited a variety of uses beyond filming concerts. The app was switched off in 2016.

== Personal life ==
Joe Sumner is the son of the musician Sting and Northern Irish actress Frances Tomelty. He is the brother of Fuschia Katherine ("Kate") and half-brother of musician Eliot Sumner and actress Mickey Sumner, who are children of Sting and actress Trudie Styler.

On 4 December 2011, he married Kate Finnerty Sumner, a philanthropist and charity fundraiser known for her work supporting the Cura orphanage in Kenya and the Crayon Collection. They have three daughters and one son.
