= Left Side of the Brain =

Studio album by Fiction Plane
- Released: 22 May 2007
- Genres: Alternative rock, indie rock
- Length: 42:59
- Label: Bieler Bros. Records
- Producer: Paul Corkett

Fiction Plane chronology
Bitter Forces and Lame Race Horses (2005)	Left Side of the Brain (2007)	Paradiso (2009)

Singles from Left Side of the Brain
- 1. "Two Sisters" Released: 22 May 2007; 2. "It's a Lie"

Professional ratings
Review scores
Source	Rating
AllMusic	3/5 stars

Left Side of the Brain is the second album by the rock band Fiction Plane. The band supported the album in 2007 when it was the opening act for The Police Reunion Tour. Two singles were released from the album: "Two Sisters" and "It's a Lie".

== Track listing ==
All songs written by Fiction Plane except 4, 8, 9, and 11 by Fiction Plane and Dan Brown.

No.	Title	Length
1.	"Anyone"	3:47
2.	"Death Machine"	3:01
3.	"Two Sisters"	3:51
4.	"It's a Lie"	3:26
5.	"Left Side of the Brain"	3:59
6.	"Cold Water Symmetry"	3:41
7.	"Running the Country"	3:40
8.	"Drink"	4:33
9.	"Presuppose"	3:30
10.	"Cross the Line"	5:14
11.	"Fake Light from the Sun"	4:17

iTunes bonus tracks
No.	Title	Length
12.	"Put Your Shoes On"
13.	"Anyone" (acoustic version)

== Personnel ==
- Joe Sumner – Vocals, Bass
- Seton Daunt – Guitar
- Pete Wilhoit – Drums

== Charts ==
Chart (2007)	Peak position
Dutch Albums (Album Top 100)	9
French Albums (SNEP)	111
US Heatseekers Albums (Billboard)	46
