= List of highest-grossing concert tours =

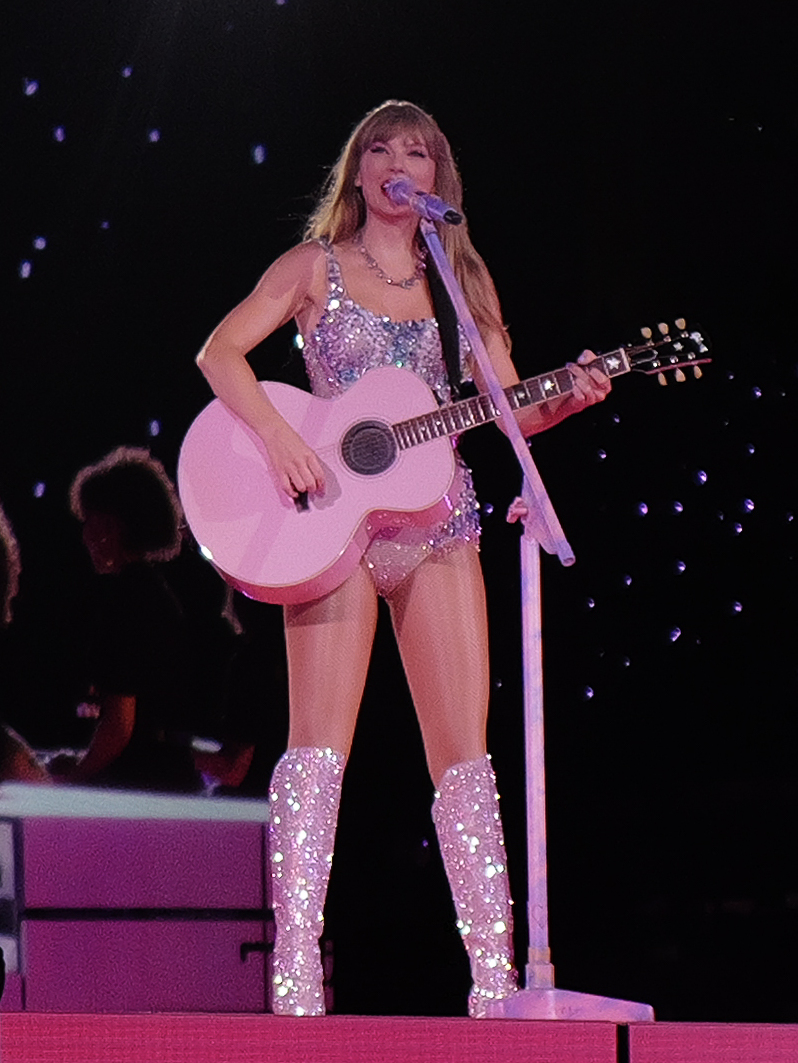
The Eras Tour by Taylor Swift is the highest-grossing tour of all time.

The following is a list of concert tours that have generated the most gross income. The data and rankings come largely from reports made by trade publications Billboard and Pollstar. Billboard, which launched the boxscore ranking in 1975 through Amusement Business, has featured the ranking on its own magazine since October 3, 1981. Pollstar began reporting data on November 29, 1981, but it has relatively little information about pre-2000 tours. In the 21st century, tour revenue skyrocketed, as record sales collapsed and musicians began relying on live shows for their income.

The first tours to surpass $100 million were Michael Jackson's Bad World Tour and Pink Floyd's Momentary Lapse of Reason Tour, both running from 1987 until 1989. Tina Turner became the first female act to achieve the feat, with her Wildest Dreams Tour (1996–1997). Pollstar estimated that Taylor Swift's Eras Tour was the first to collect $1 billion in 2023, though Coldplay's Music of the Spheres World Tour became the first to officially report the number in August 2024. The Eras Tour concluded in December 2024 with $2.07 billion, becoming the first tour to reach $2 billion.

The Rolling Stones set the all-time record for touring revenue three times (1990, 1995 and 2006), more than any other act. Their Voodoo Lounge Tour remained the highest-grossing tour of all time for 11 years (1995–2006), longer than any other record-holder. They are the only musicians to achieve the highest-grossing tour of the decade twice, in the 1990s and the 2000s. The Rolling Stones and U2 have mounted the highest-grossing tour of the year eight times each, more than any other act. Some of the highest-grossing tours had extensive schedules. Inside the Top 20, Elton John's Farewell Yellow Brick Road is the longest (330 shows in five years), while Beyoncé's Renaissance World Tour is the shortest (56 shows in a single year).

== Highest-grossing tours ==
Keys
†	Indicates an ongoing tour
*	Indicates a tour with dates split between two different calendar decades

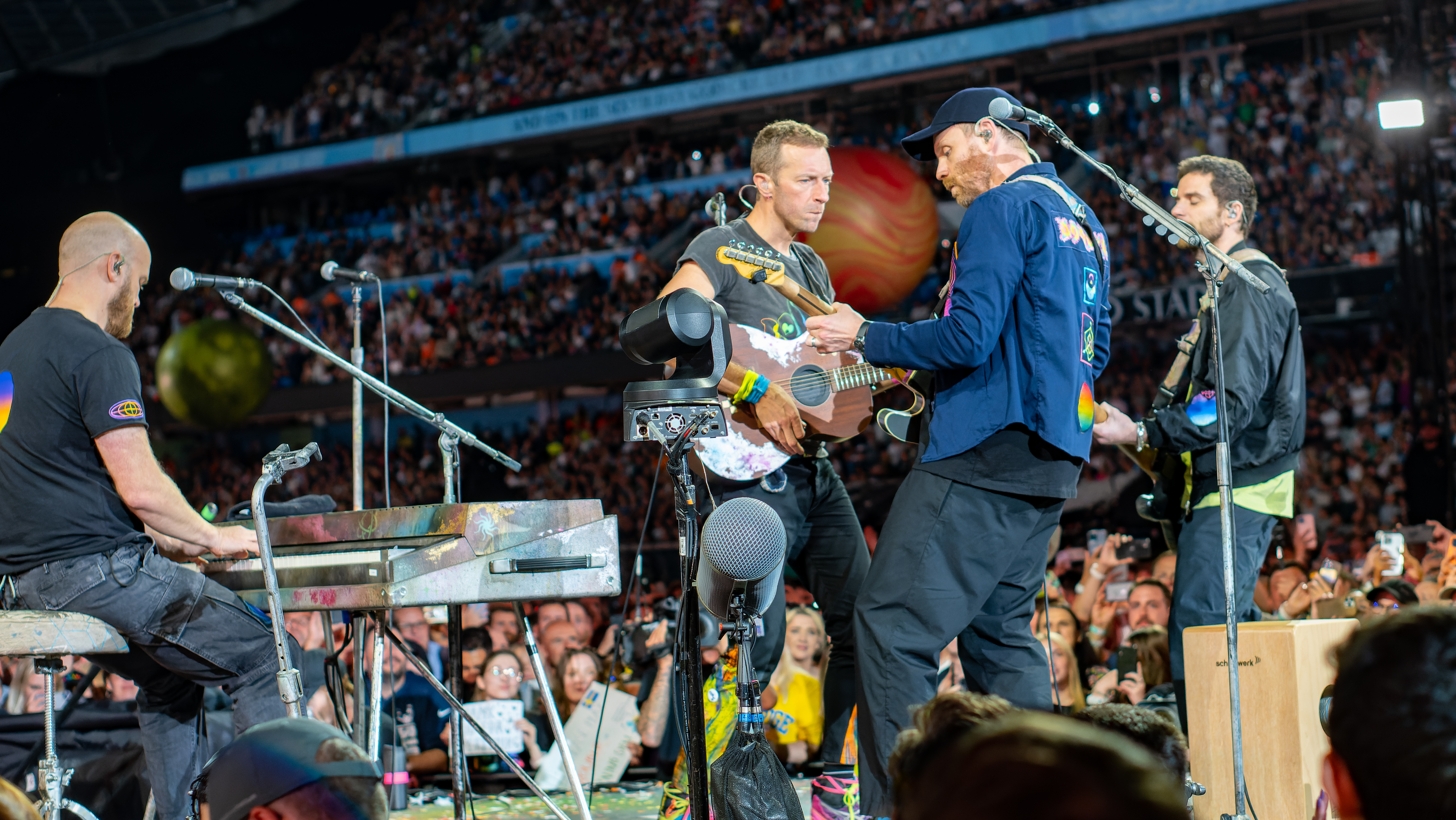
Coldplay on the Music of the Spheres World Tour

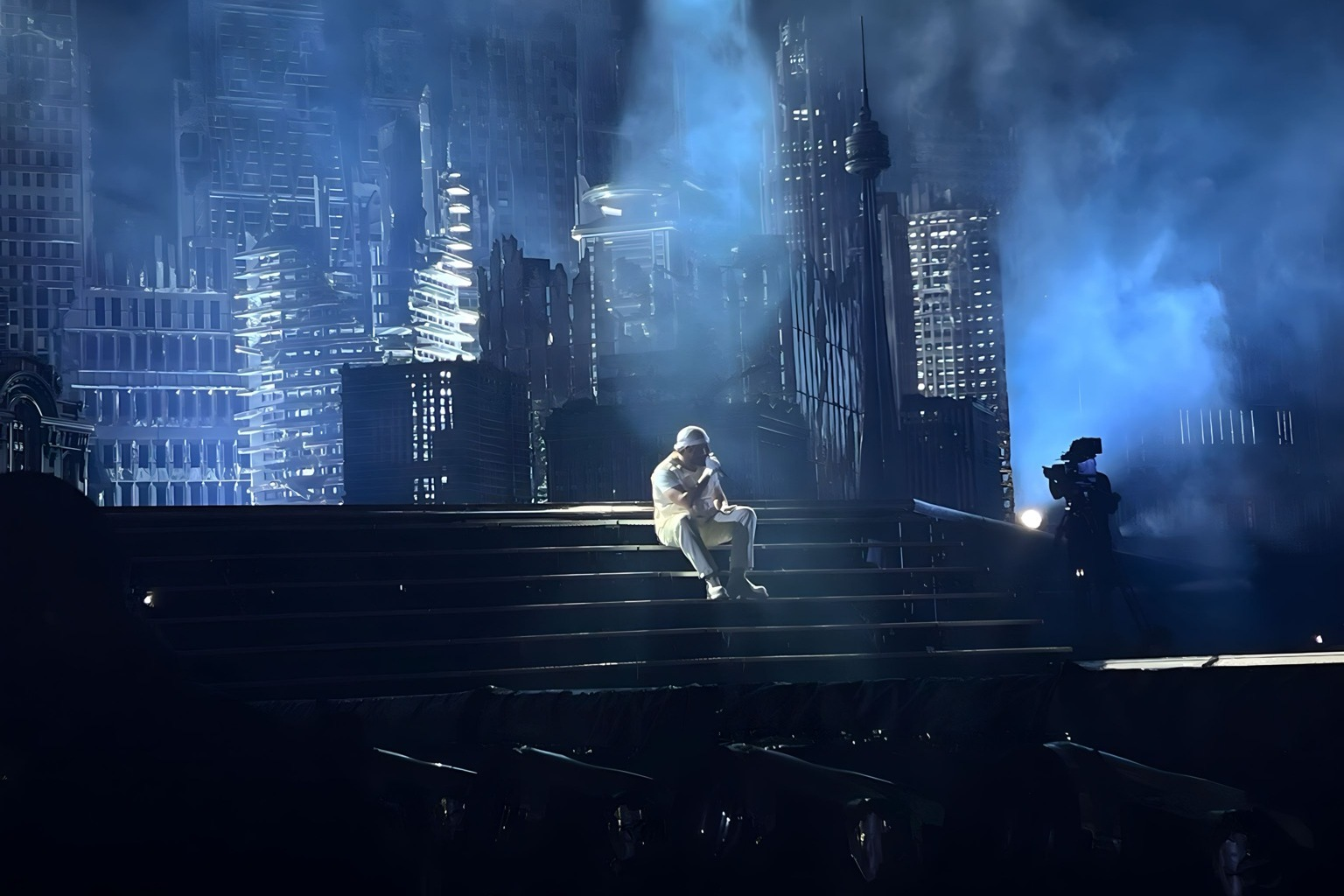
The Weeknd on the After Hours til Dawn Tour

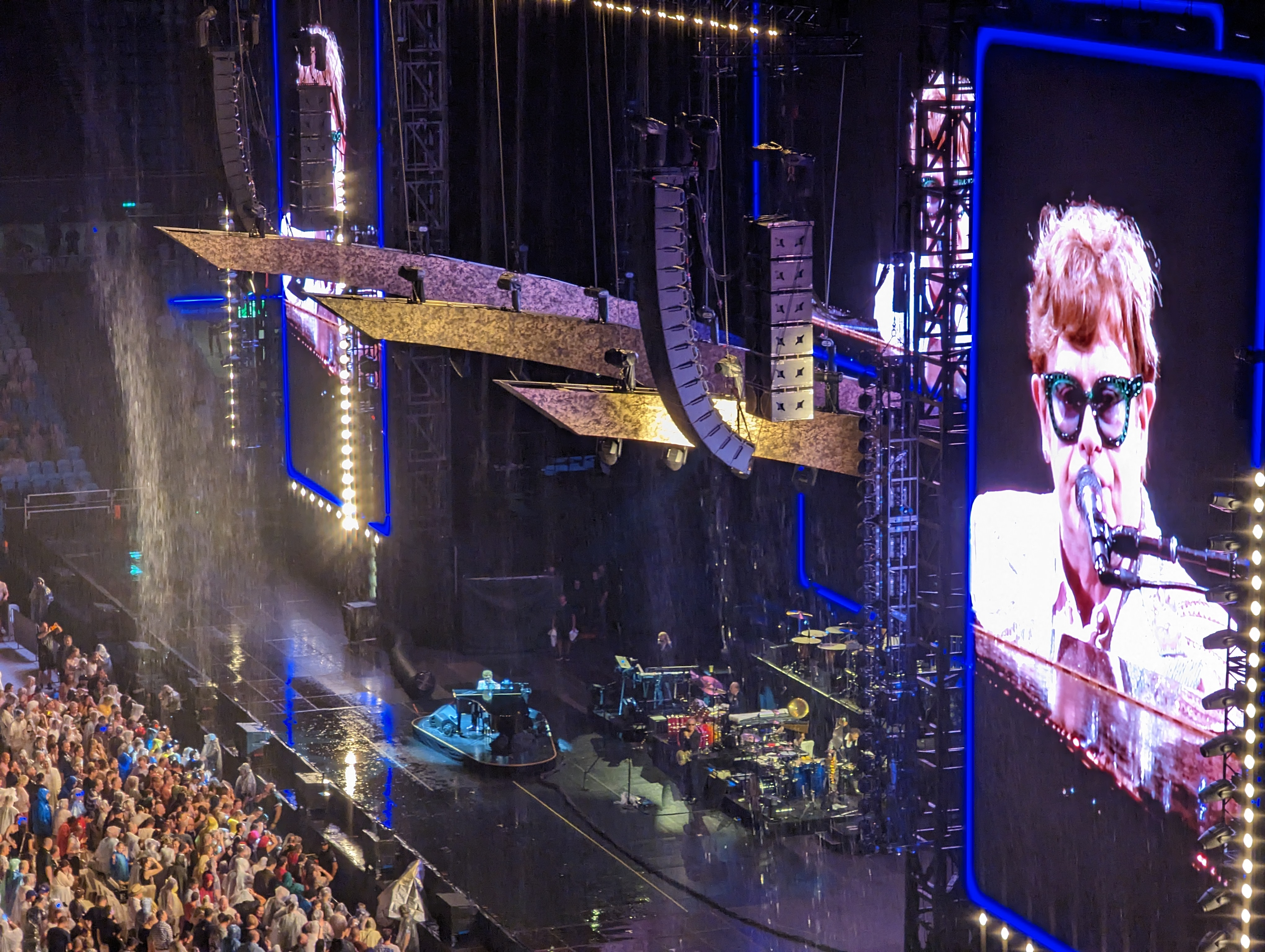
Elton John on the Farewell Yellow Brick Road

Top 20 highest-grossing tours of all time
Rank	Peak	Actual gross	Adjusted gross (in 2025 dollars)	Artist	Tour title	Year	Shows	Average gross	Ref.
1	1	$2,077,618,725	$2,132,275,503	Taylor Swift	The Eras Tour	2023–2024	149	$13,943,750	
2	2	$1,524,423,018	$1,524,423,018	Coldplay	Music of the Spheres World Tour	2022–2025	223	$6,835,978	
3	3	$1,300,000,000	$1,300,000,000	The Weeknd	After Hours til Dawn Tour	2022–2026	176	$7,386,364	
4	1	$939,100,000	$992,332,077	Elton John	Farewell Yellow Brick Road	2018–2023	330	$2,845,758	
5	4	$875,700,000	$875,700,000	Ed Sheeran	+−=÷× Tour	2022–2025	169	$5,181,657	
6	1	$776,200,000	$977,448,262	Ed Sheeran	÷ Tour	2017–2019	255	$3,043,922	
7	1	$736,421,586	$1,053,976,160	U2	360° Tour	2009–2011	110	$6,694,742	
8	6	$729,700,000	$729,700,000	Bruce Springsteen · E Street Band	2023–2025 Tour	2023–2025	129	$5,656,589	
9	9	$668,400,000	$668,400,000	Metallica	M72 World Tour †	2023–2027	86	$7,772,093	(Note: Metallica's M72 World Tour grossed $476 million from April 2023 to August 2025 (64 shows). They expanded the number with $41.5 million in November 2025 (6 shows), $72.6 million in May 2026 (7 shows), $57.1 million in June 2026 (7 shows) and $21.2 million in July 2026 (2 shows).)
10	4	$617,325,000	$652,317,538	Harry Styles	Love On Tour	2021–2023	169	$3,652,811	
11	8	$584,700,000	$600,081,945	Pink	Summer Carnival	2023–2024	97	$6,027,835	
12	3	$584,200,000	$735,667,708	Guns N' Roses	Not in This Lifetime... Tour	2016–2019	158	$3,697,468	
13	7	$579,879,268	$612,749,227	Beyoncé	Renaissance World Tour	2023	56	$10,353,571	
14	14	$574,500,000	$574,500,000	BTS	Arirang World Tour †	2026	48	$11,968,750	(Note: BTS's Arirang World Tour grossed $76.2 million in April, $127.8 million in May, $38.6 million in June, $102.5 million in July, $171.7 million in August 2026, and $57.7 million in September 2026.)
15	14	$565,500,000	$565,500,000	Shakira	Las Mujeres Ya No Lloran World Tour †	2025–2026	124	$4,560,484	
16	13	$563,000,000	$577,811,075	Rammstein	Stadium Tour	2019–2024	141	$3,992,908	
17	1	$558,255,524	$866,814,668	The Rolling Stones	A Bigger Bang Tour	2005–2007	144	$3,876,774	
18	5	$546,500,000	$649,316,898	The Rolling Stones	No Filter Tour	2017–2021	58	$9,422,414	
19	3	$523,033,675	$686,987,620	Coldplay	A Head Full of Dreams Tour	2016–2017	114	$4,588,015	
20	18	$477,700,000	$477,700,000	Zach Bryan	The Quittin' Time Tour	2024–2025	92	$5,192,391	(Note: Zach Bryan's The Quittin' Time Tour grossed $318.1 million during March–August 2024, and $159.6 million during November 2024–September 2025.)

=== Timeline of the highest-grossing tour ===
Timeline of the highest-grossing tour
Year	Record gross	Adjusted gross (in 2025 dollars)	Artist	Tour title	Ref.
1984	$75,000,000	$232,423,126	The Jacksons	Victory Tour	
1985	$90,000,000	$269,415,223	Bruce Springsteen · E Street Band	Born in the U.S.A. Tour	
1989	$125,000,000	$324,664,430	Michael Jackson	Bad World Tour	
1989	$135,000,000	$350,637,584	Pink Floyd	A Momentary Lapse of Reason Tour	
1990	$175,000,000	$431,259,552	The Rolling Stones	Steel Wheels/Urban Jungle Tour	
1994	$250,000,000	$543,051,190	Pink Floyd	The Division Bell Tour	
1995	$320,000,000	$676,130,159	The Rolling Stones	Voodoo Lounge Tour	
2006	$333,000,000	$531,821,558	U2	Vertigo Tour	
2006	$437,000,000	$697,915,979	The Rolling Stones	A Bigger Bang Tour	
2007	$558,255,524	$866,814,668	The Rolling Stones	A Bigger Bang Tour	
2011	$736,421,586	$1,053,976,160	U2	360° Tour	
2019	$776,200,000	$977,448,262	Ed Sheeran	÷ Tour	
2023	$939,100,000	$992,332,077	Elton John	Farewell Yellow Brick Road	
2023	$1,039,263,762	$1,098,173,536	Taylor Swift	The Eras Tour	
2024	$2,077,618,725	$2,132,275,503	Taylor Swift	The Eras Tour	

== Highest-grossing tours by decade ==
=== 1980s ===
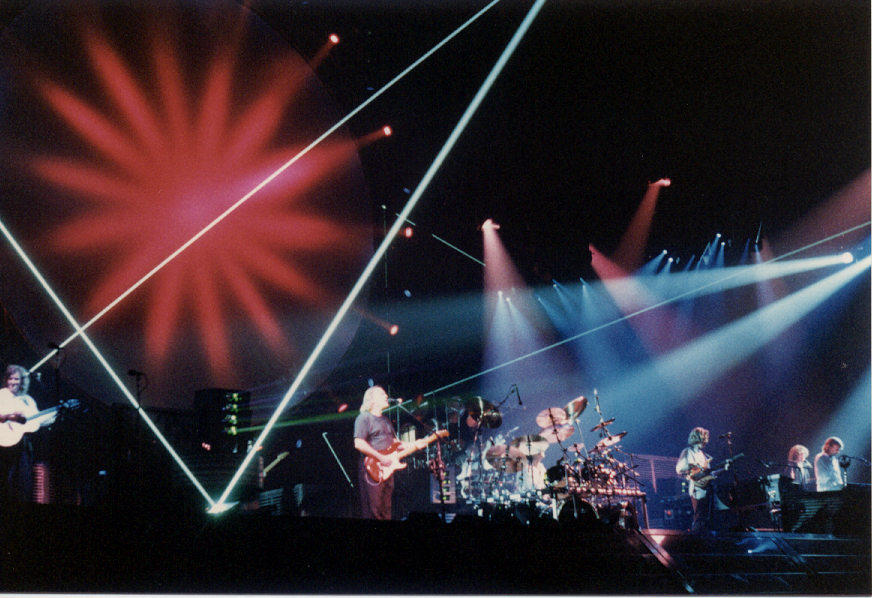
Pink Floyd on the Momentary Lapse of Reason Tour

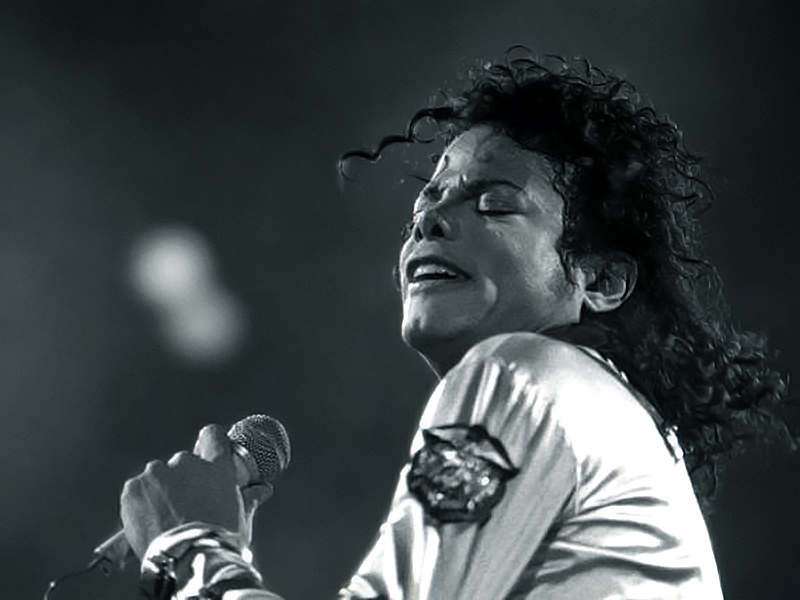
Michael Jackson on the Bad World Tour

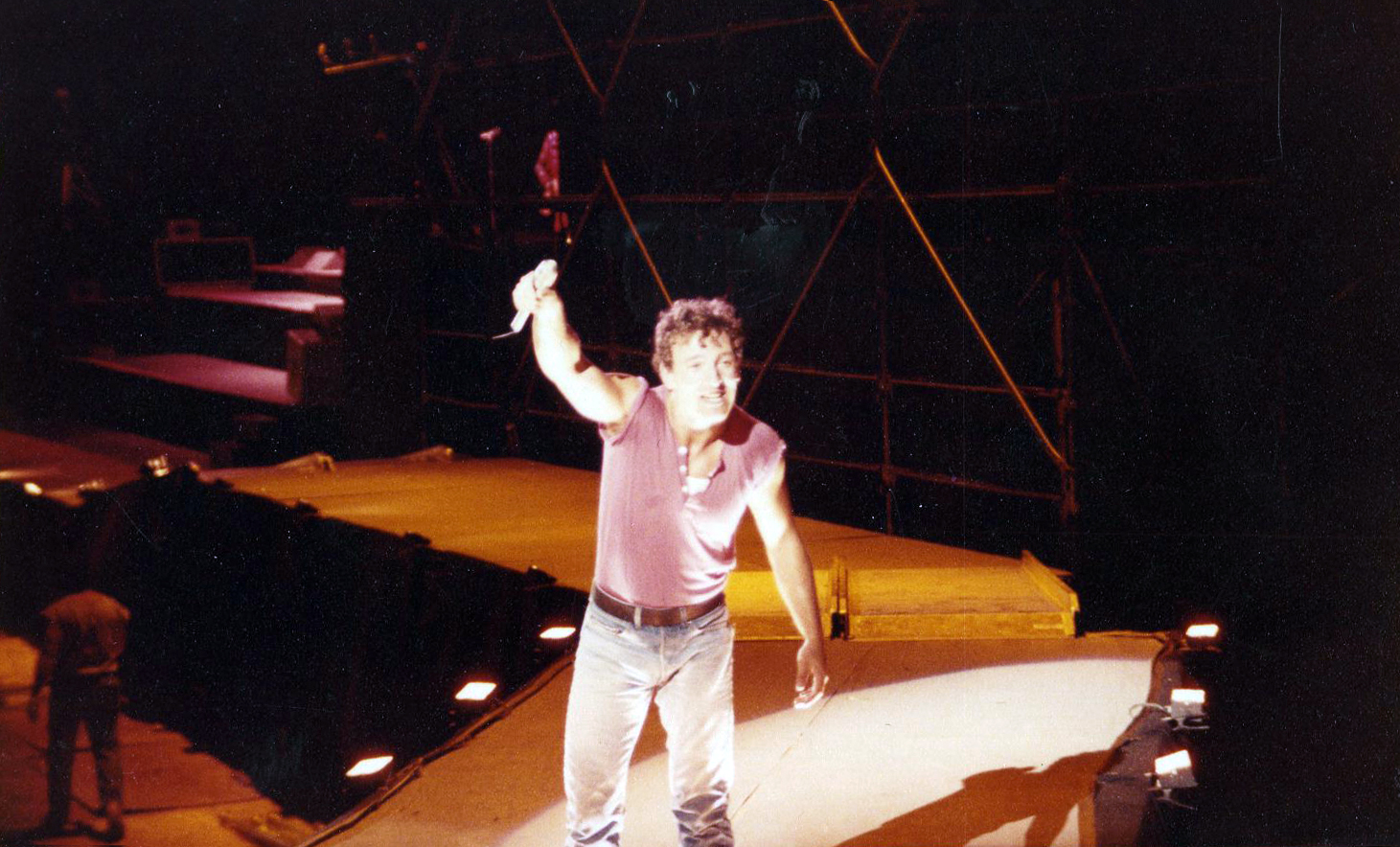
Bruce Springsteen on the Born in the U.S.A. Tour

Top 10 highest-grossing tours of the 1980s
Rank	Actual gross	Adjusted gross (in 2025 dollars)	Artist	Tour title	Year	Shows	Average gross	Ref.
1	$135,000,000	$350,637,584	Pink Floyd	A Momentary Lapse of Reason Tour	1987–1989	197	$685,279	
2	$125,000,000	$324,664,430	Michael Jackson	Bad World Tour	1987–1989	123	$1,016,260	
3	$98,000,000	$254,536,913	The Rolling Stones	Steel Wheels Tour	1989 *	60	$1,633,333	(Note: Excluding the shows from the Urban Jungle extension.)
4	$90,000,000	$269,415,223	Bruce Springsteen · E Street Band	Born in the U.S.A. Tour	1984–1985	156	$576,923	
5	$86,000,000	$243,717,047	David Bowie	Glass Spider Tour	1987	86	$1,000,000	
6	$75,000,000	$232,423,126	The Jacksons	Victory Tour	1984	55	$1,363,636	
7	$60,000,000	$170,035,149	Genesis	Invisible Touch Tour	1986–1987	111	$540,541	
8	$60,000,000	$163,337,085	Tina Turner	Break Every Rule World Tour	1987–1988	220	$272,727	
9	$56,000,000	$158,699,473	U2	The Joshua Tree Tour	1987	109	$513,761	
10	$50,000,000	$177,068,082	The Rolling Stones	American Tour 1981	1981	50	$1,000,000	

=== 1990s ===
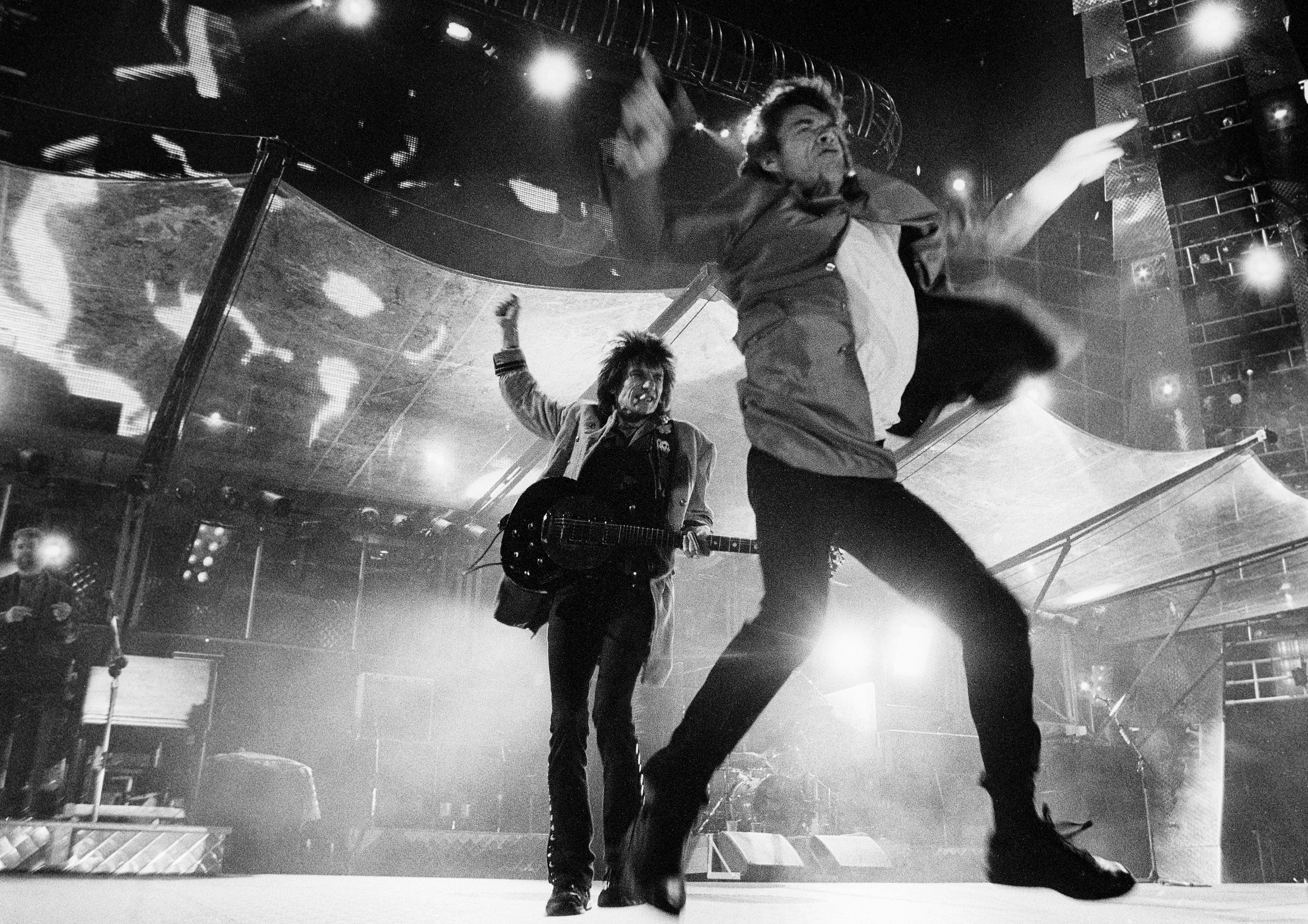
The Rolling Stones on the Voodoo Lounge Tour

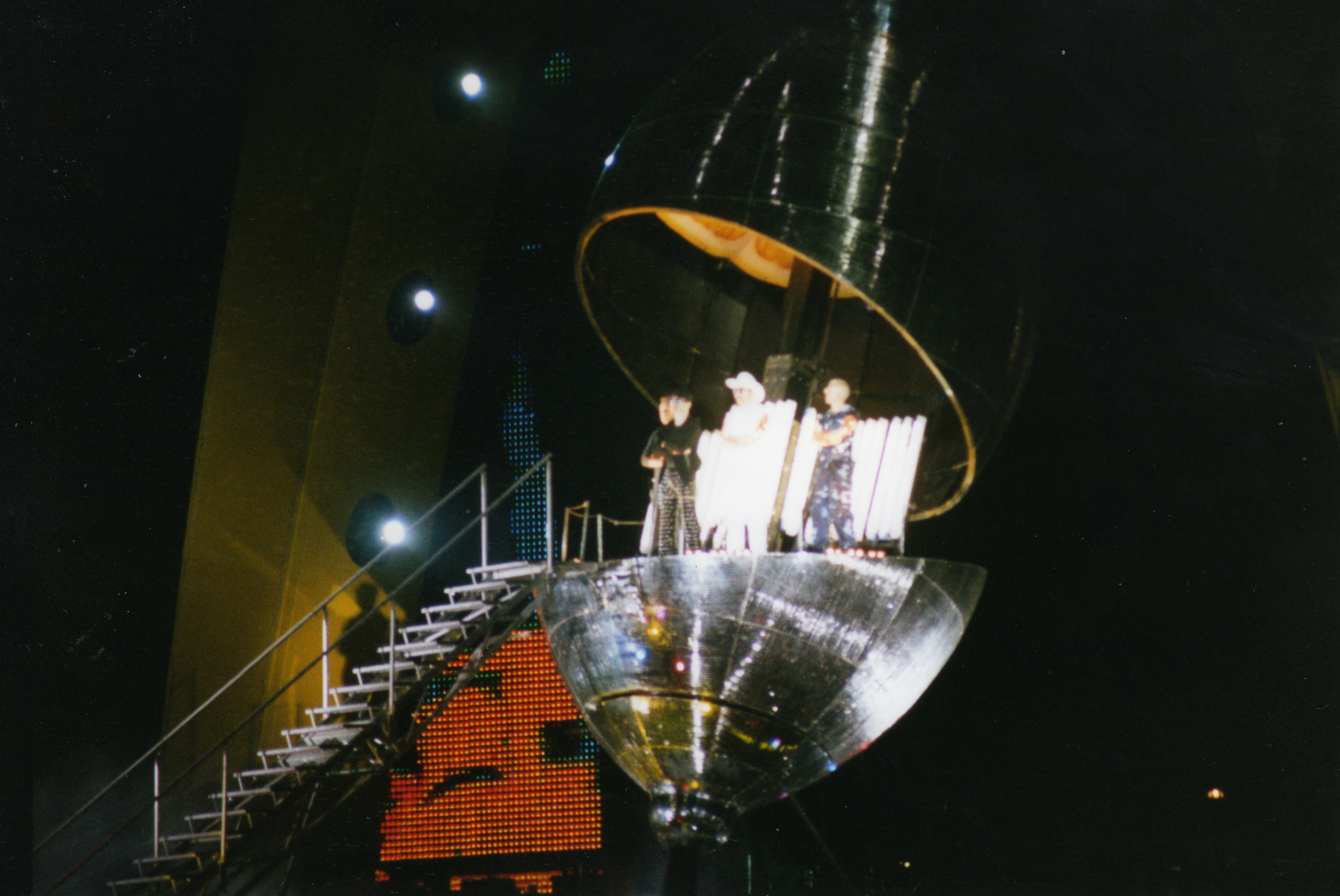
U2 on the PopMart Tour

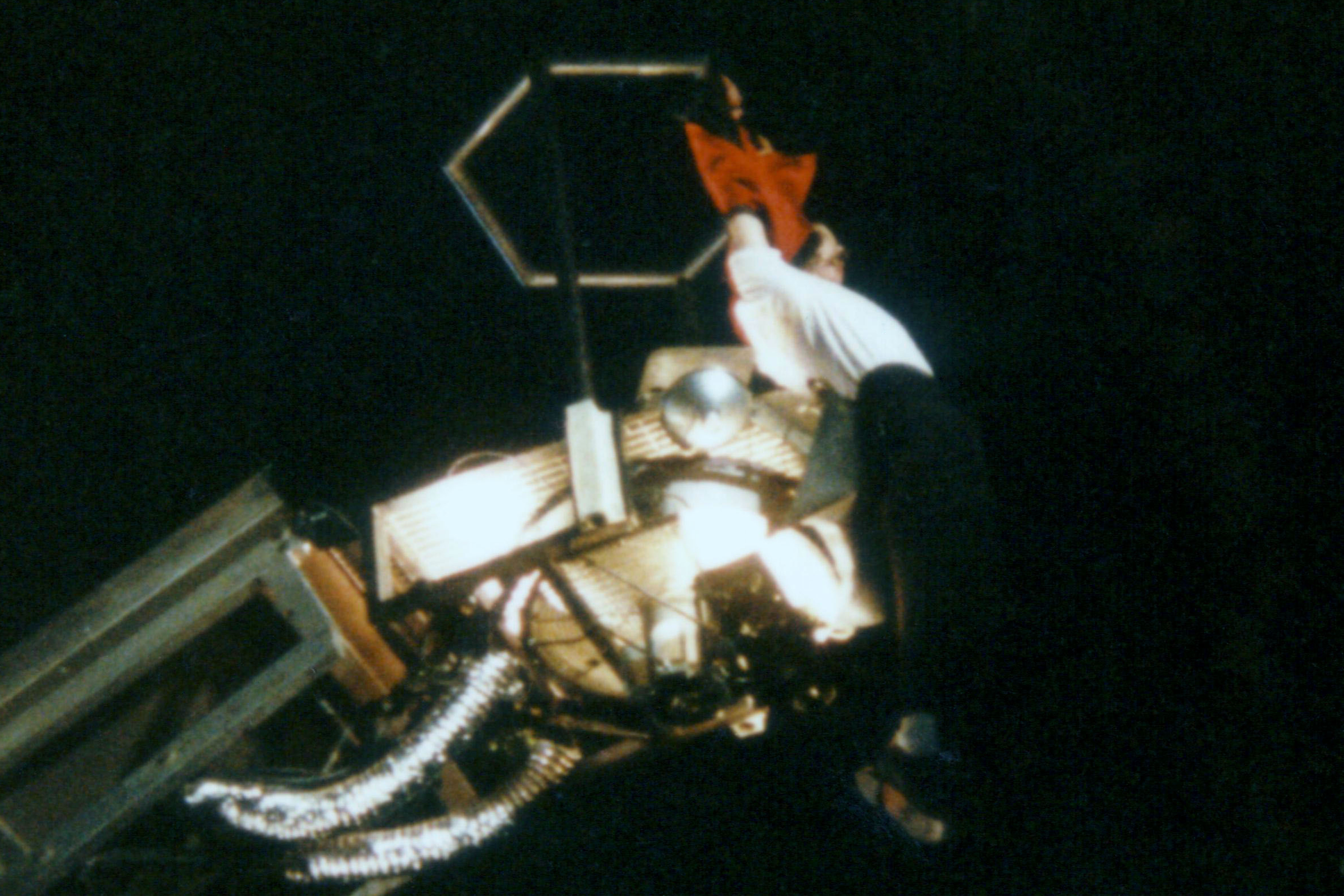
Michael Jackson on the HIStory World Tour

Top 10 highest-grossing tours of the 1990s
Rank	Actual gross	Adjusted gross (in 2025 dollars)	Artist	Tour title	Year	Shows	Average gross	Ref.
1	$320,000,000	$676,130,159	The Rolling Stones	Voodoo Lounge Tour	1994–1995	129	$2,480,620	
2	$274,000,000	$541,231,115	The Rolling Stones	Bridges to Babylon Tour	1997–1998	108	$2,537,037	
3	$250,000,000	$543,051,190	Pink Floyd	The Division Bell Tour	1994	110	$2,272,727	
4	$173,610,864	$344,314,933	U2	PopMart Tour	1997–1998	93	$1,866,783	
5	$165,000,000	$330,923,507	Michael Jackson	HIStory World Tour	1996–1997	83	$1,987,952	
6	$152,900,000	$313,878,103	Eagles	Hell Freezes Over Tour	1994–1996	122	$1,274,107	(Note: Eagles' Hell Freezes Over Tour grossed $79.4 million in 1994, $63.3 million in 1995, and $10.2 million in 1996.)
7	$151,000,000	$336,541,120	U2	Zoo TV Tour	1992–1993	157	$961,783	
8	$133,000,000	$257,046,544	Celine Dion	Let's Talk About Love World Tour	1998–1999	97	$1,371,134	
9	$130,000,000	$260,727,612	Tina Turner	Wildest Dreams Tour	1996–1997	255	$509,804	
10	$105,000,000	$207,406,084	Garth Brooks	The Garth Brooks World Tour	1996–1998	220	$477,273	

=== 2000s ===
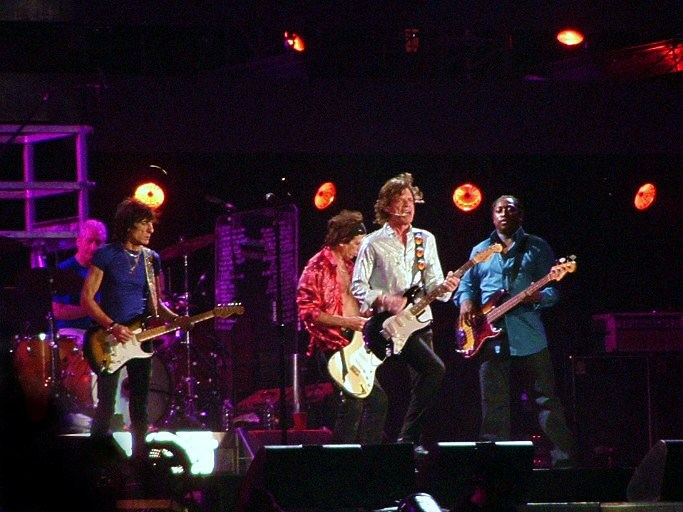
The Rolling Stones on the Bigger Bang Tour

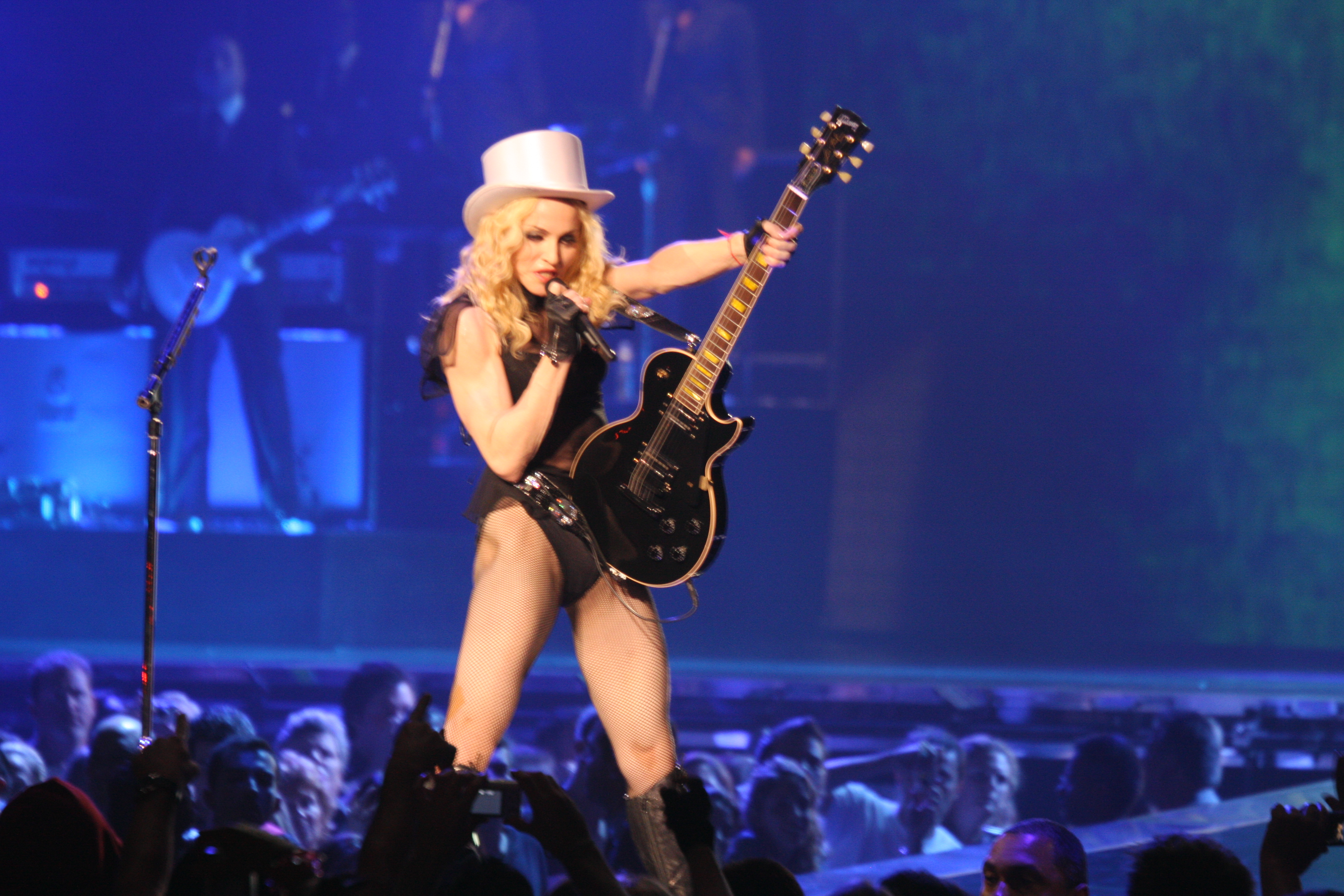
Madonna on the Sticky & Sweet Tour

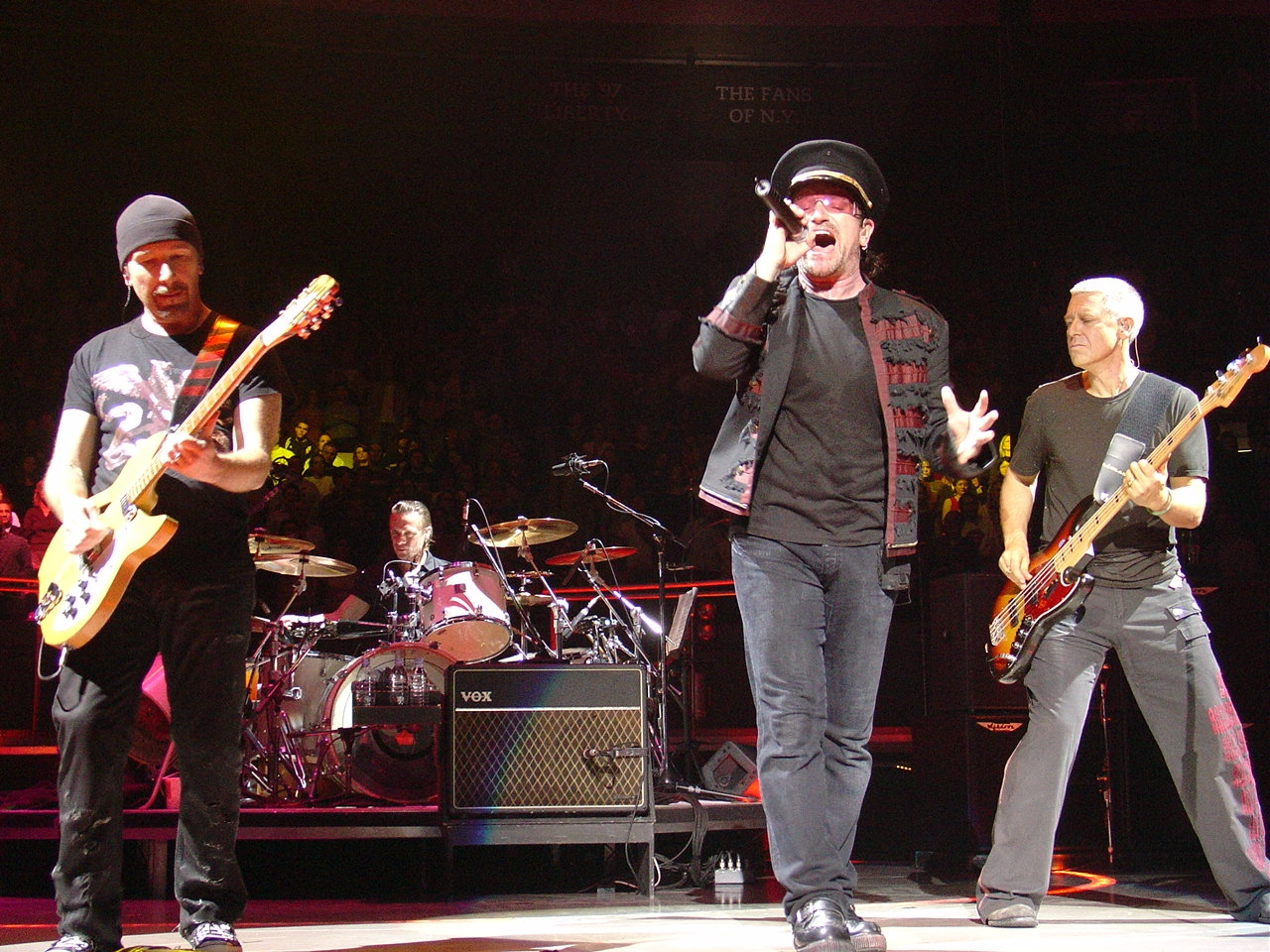
U2 on the Vertigo Tour

Top 10 highest-grossing tours of the 2000s
Rank	Actual gross	Adjusted gross (in 2025 dollars)	Artist	Tour title	Year	Shows	Average gross	Ref.
1	$558,255,524	$866,814,668	The Rolling Stones	A Bigger Bang Tour	2005–2007	144	$3,876,774	
2	$411,000,000	$616,786,878	Madonna	Sticky & Sweet Tour	2008–2009	85	$4,835,294	
3	$389,000,000	$621,257,016	U2	Vertigo Tour	2005–2006	131	$2,969,466	
4	$358,825,665	$536,574,700	The Police	Reunion Tour	2007–2008	146	$2,457,710	
5	$311,637,730	$467,674,118	U2	360° Tour	2009 *	44	$7,082,676	(Note: U2's 360° Tour grossed $311,637,730 in the 2000s decade (2009) and $424,783,856 in the 2010s (2010 and 2011).)
6	$311,000,000	$544,306,259	The Rolling Stones	Licks Tour	2002–2003	117	$2,658,120	
7	$279,200,000	$418,994,881	Celine Dion	Taking Chances World Tour	2008–2009	129	$2,164,341	(Note: Celine Dion's Taking Chances World Tour grossed $236.6 million in 2008 and $42.6 million in 2009.)
8	$264,100,000	$396,334,342	AC/DC	Black Ice World Tour	2008–2009 *	127	$2,079,528	(Note: Within the 2000s decade, AC/DC's Black Ice World Tour grossed $37.5 million in 2008 and $226.6 million in 2009.)
9	$250,000,000	$412,123,019	Cher	Living Proof: The Farewell Tour	2002–2005	325	$769,231	(Note: Cher's Living Proof: The Farewell Tour grossed $194,683,927 from 280 reported shows according to Billboard, bringing an average gross of $695,000 per show. Total gross for the tour's 325 dates is estimated between $200 million and $250 million.)
10	$235,000,000	$351,410,355	Bruce Springsteen · E Street Band	Magic Tour	2007–2008	104	$2,259,615	

=== 2010s ===
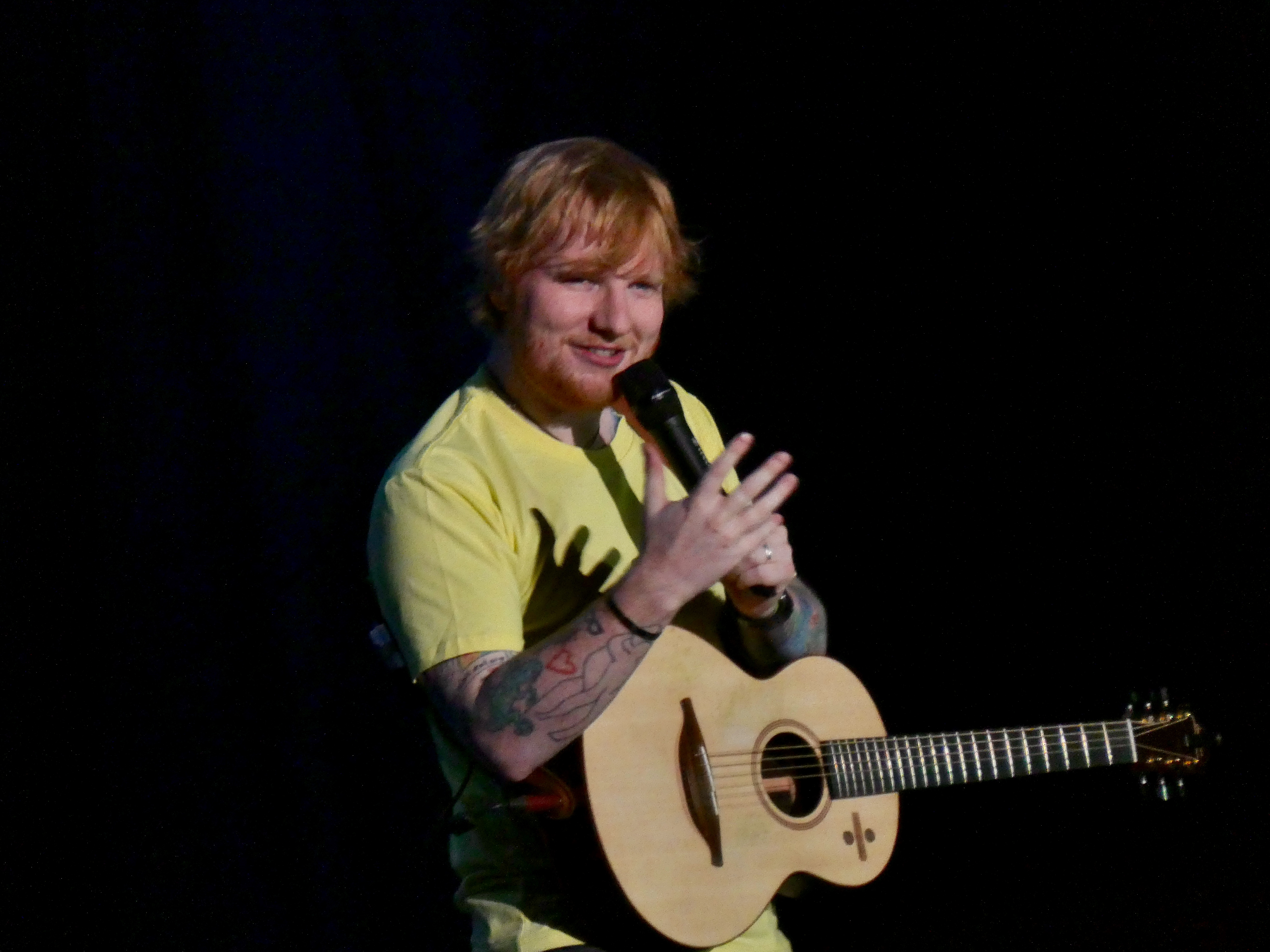
Ed Sheeran on the ÷ Tour

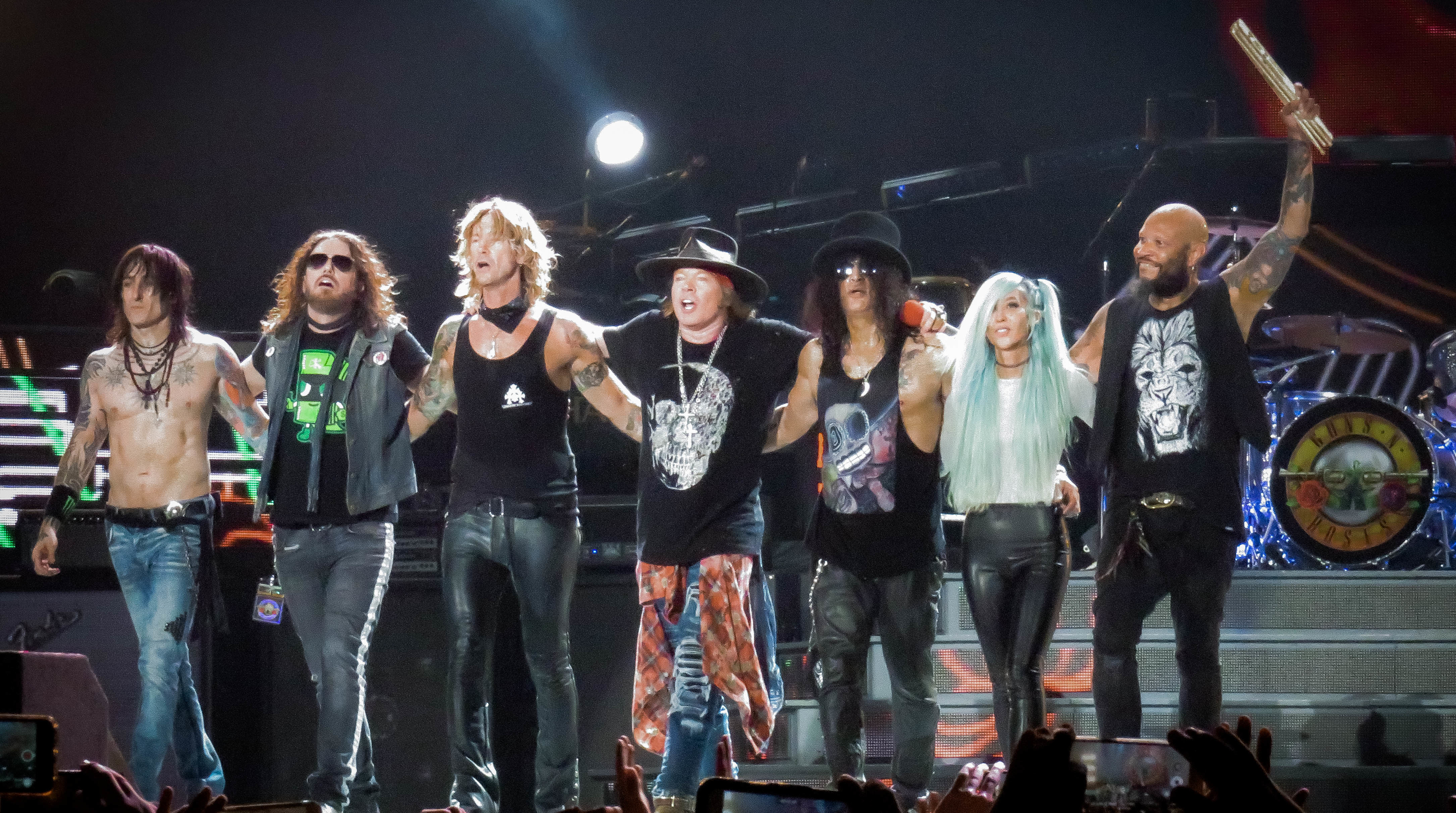
Guns N' Roses on the Not in This Lifetime... Tour

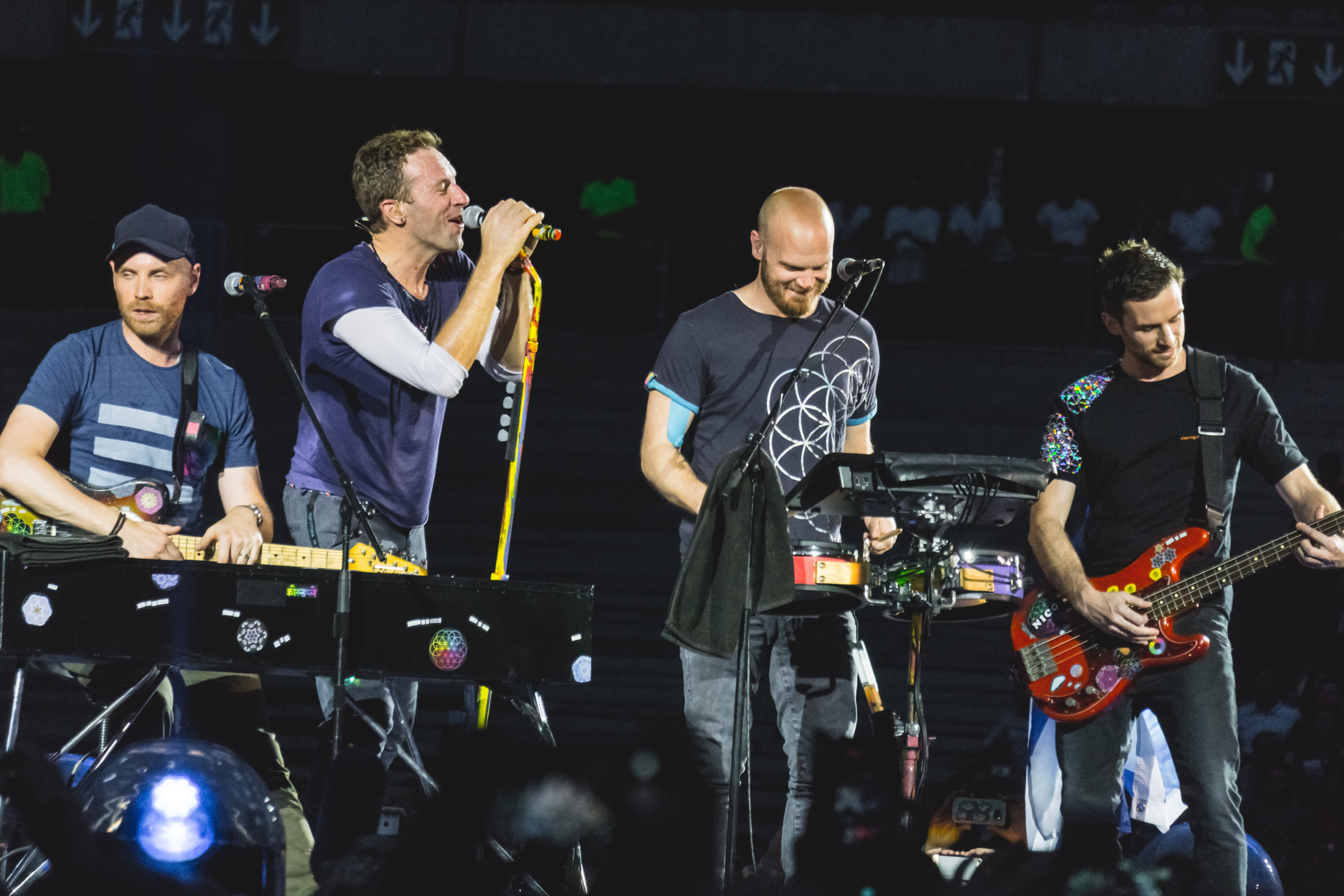
Coldplay on the Head Full of Dreams Tour

Top 10 highest-grossing tours of the 2010s
Rank	Actual gross	Adjusted gross (in 2025 dollars)	Artist	Tour title	Year	Shows	Average gross	Ref.
1	$776,200,000	$977,448,262	Ed Sheeran	÷ Tour	2017–2019	255	$3,043,922	
2	$584,200,000	$735,667,708	Guns N' Roses	Not in This Lifetime... Tour	2016–2019	158	$3,697,468	
3	$523,033,675	$686,987,620	Coldplay	A Head Full of Dreams Tour	2016–2017	114	$4,588,015	
4	$459,000,000	$634,403,571	Roger Waters	The Wall Live	2010–2013	219	$2,094,401	
5	$430,000,000	$541,487,700	Metallica	WorldWired Tour	2016–2019	143	$3,006,993	
6	$424,783,856	$607,956,184	U2	360° Tour	2010–2011 *	66	$6,436,119	
7	$415,600,000	$523,354,159	The Rolling Stones	No Filter Tour	2017–2019 *	44	$9,445,455	
8	$397,300,000	$500,309,449	Pink	Beautiful Trauma World Tour	2018–2019	156	$2,546,795	
9	$396,100,000	$507,854,161	Bruno Mars	24K Magic World Tour	2017–2018	191	$2,073,822	
10	$390,778,581	$492,097,198	U2	The Joshua Tree Tours 2017 & 2019	2017 · 2019	66	$5,920,888	

=== 2020s ===
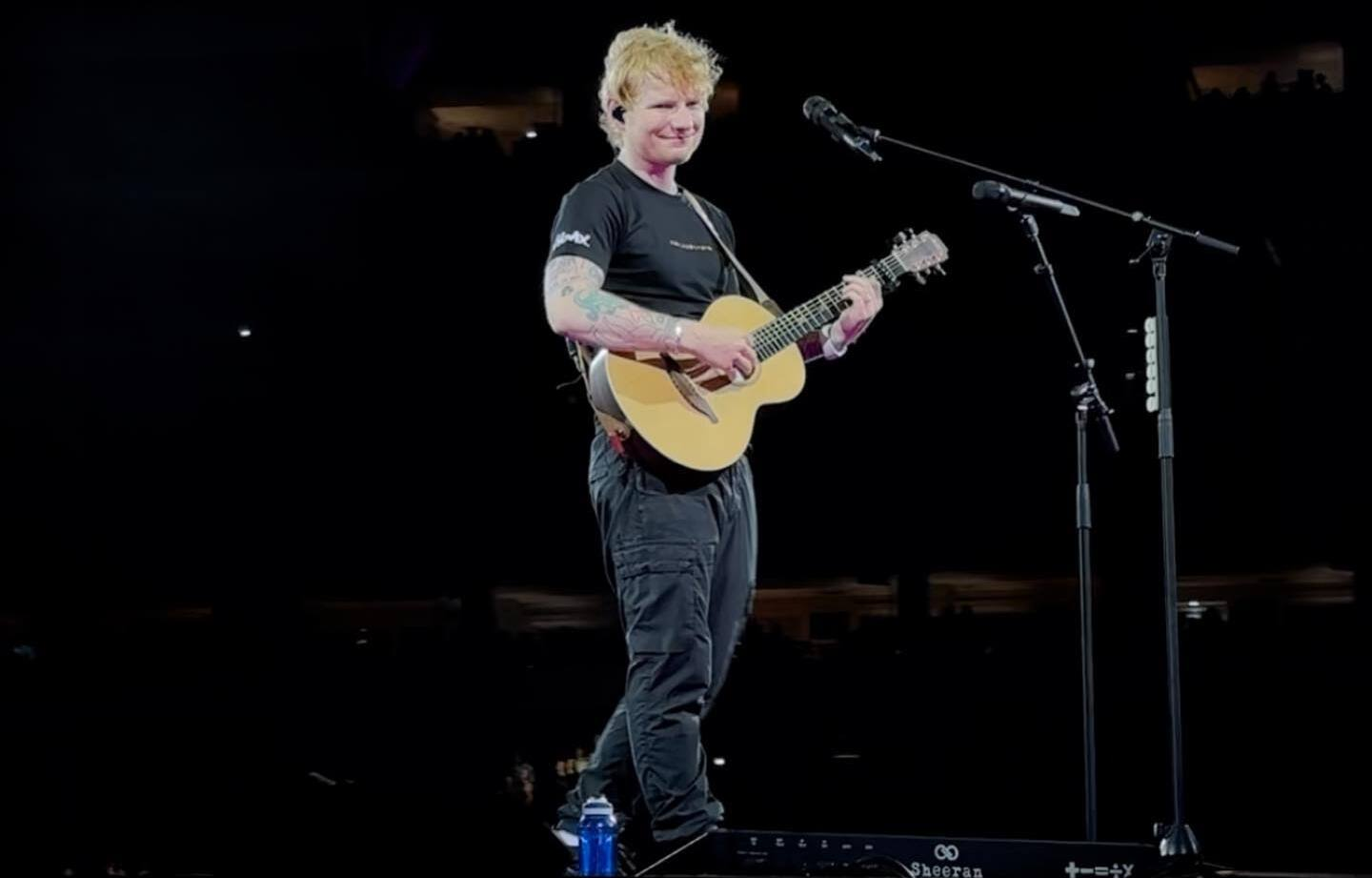
Ed Sheeran on the +−=÷× Tour

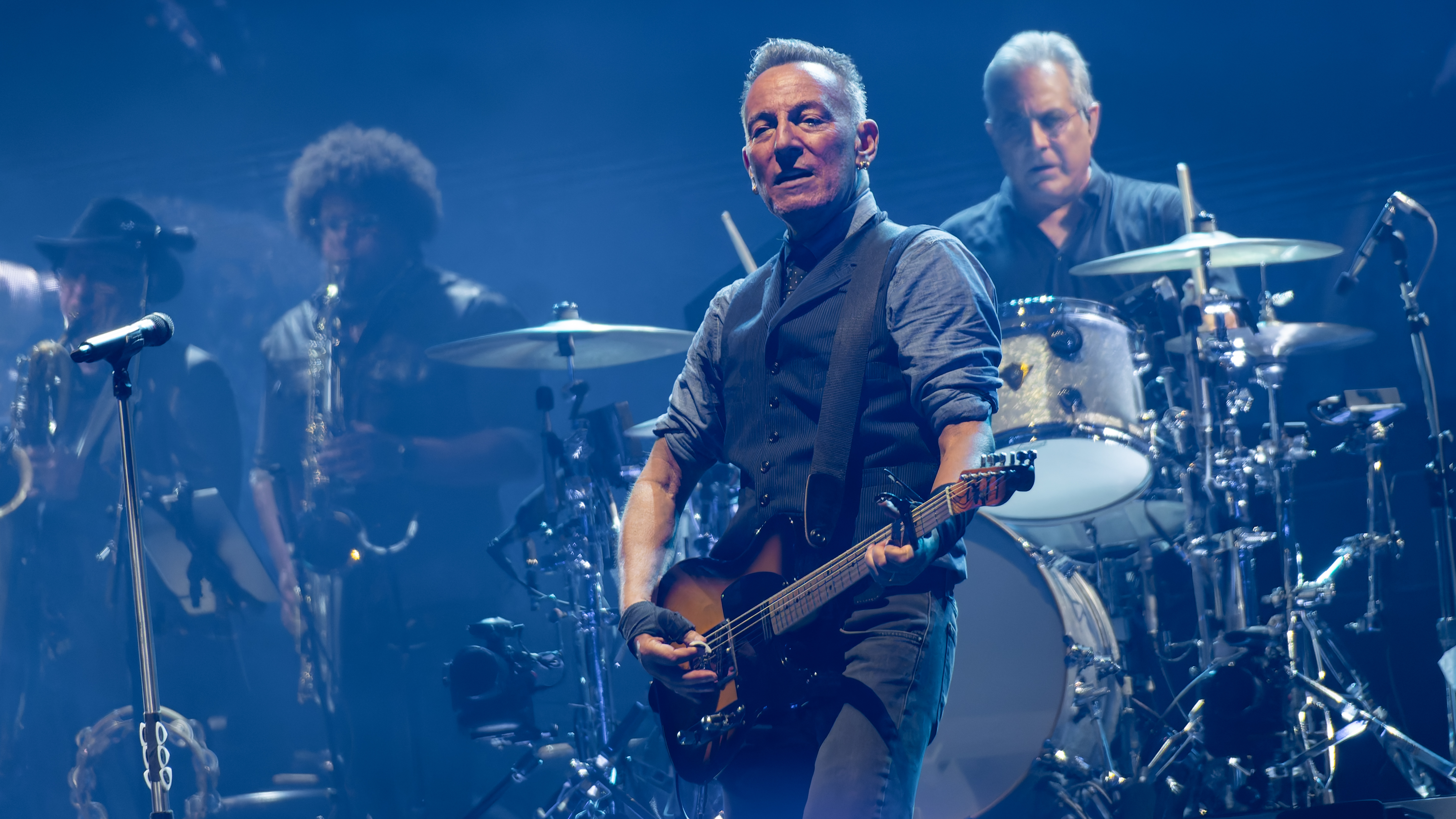
Bruce Springsteen and the E Street Band on the 2023–2025 Tour

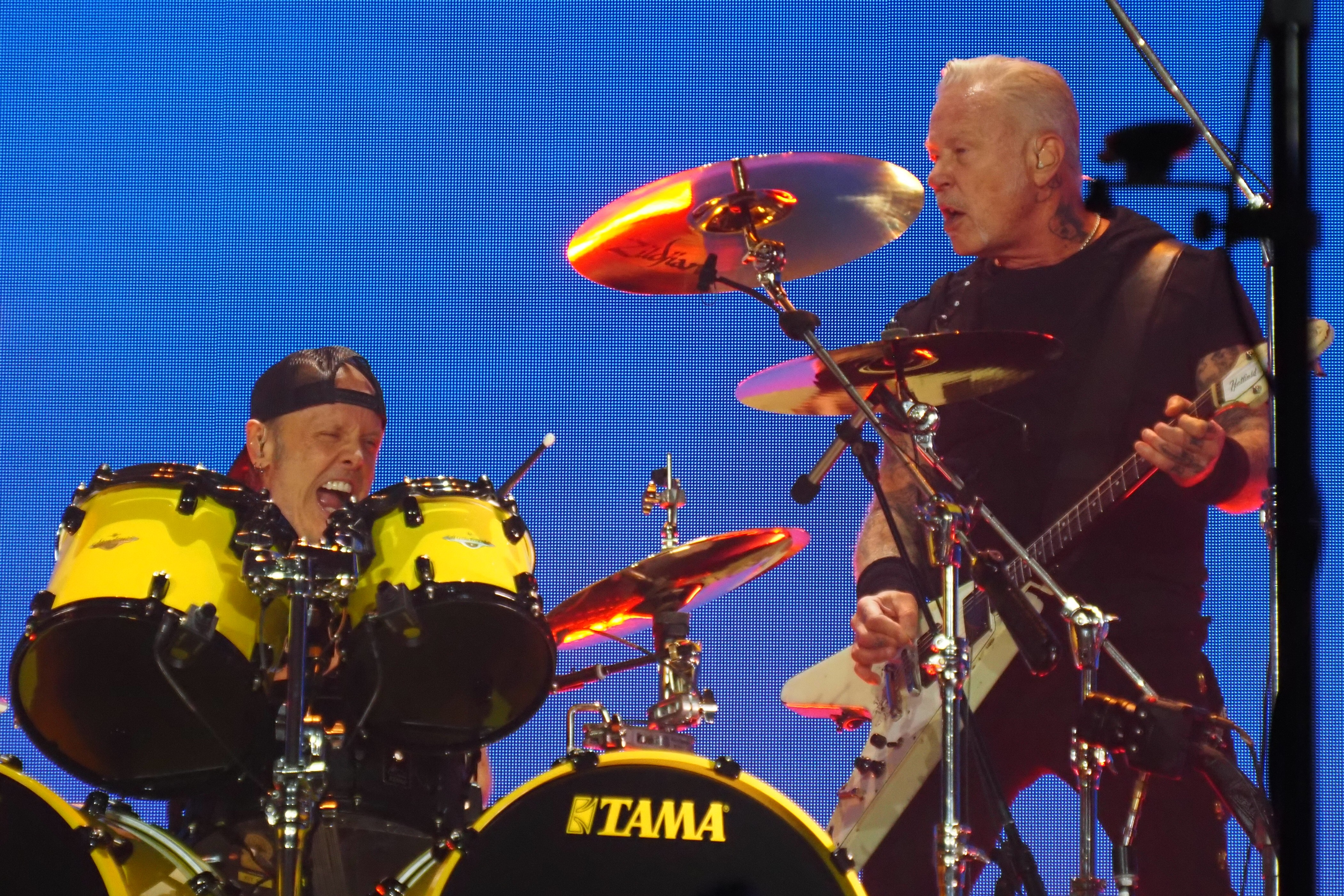
Metallica on the M72 World Tour

Top 10 highest-grossing tours of the 2020s
Rank	Actual gross	Adjusted gross (in 2025 dollars)	Artist	Tour title	Year	Shows	Average gross	Ref.
1	$2,077,618,725	$2,132,275,503	Taylor Swift	The Eras Tour	2023–2024	149	$13,943,750	
2	$1,524,423,018	$1,524,423,018	Coldplay	Music of the Spheres World Tour	2022–2025	223	$6,835,978	
3	$1,300,000,000	$1,300,000,000	The Weeknd	After Hours til Dawn Tour	2022–2026	176	$7,386,364	
4	$875,700,000	$875,700,000	Ed Sheeran	+–=÷× Tour	2022–2025	169	$5,181,657	
5	$729,700,000	$729,700,000	Bruce Springsteen · E Street Band	2023–2025 Tour	2023–2025	129	$5,656,589	
6	$668,400,000	$668,400,000	Metallica	M72 World Tour	2023–2026	86	$7,772,093	
7	$617,325,000	$652,317,538	Harry Styles	Love On Tour	2021–2023	169	$3,652,663	
8	$599,644,374	$633,634,701	Elton John	Farewell Yellow Brick Road	2020–2023 *	170	$3,527,320	(Note: Within the 2020s decade, Elton John's Farewell Yellow Brick Road grossed $55,259,351 in 2020 (21 shows), $334,385,023 in 2022 (84 shows), and $210,000,000 in 2023 (65 shows).)
9	$584,700,000	$600,081,945	Pink	Summer Carnival	2023–2024	97	$6,027,835	
10	$579,800,000	$612,665,465	Beyoncé	Renaissance World Tour	2023	56	$10,353,571	

== Highest-grossing tours by year ==
This list represents the top-grossing tour of each year according to data provided by either Pollstar or Billboard Boxscore (formerly Amusement Business). The two publications may differ on their annual figures due to different total of dates reported or different year-end tracking period. For example, Pollstar listed Madonna's Sticky & Sweet Tour as the top tour of 2008 with $281.6 million, but Billboard ranked it third on their year-end chart whose tracking period ended on November 11, 2008, thus excluding 20 shows by Madonna. In 2019, Billboard listed Ed Sheeran's ÷ Tour as the top tour of the year ($223.7 million), instead of Pink's Beautiful Trauma World Tour ($215.2 million) as reported by Pollstar. However, Billboard's figure included Sheeran's gross from November 2018 shows; therefore, Pollstar's figure is closer to accurate for the 2019 calendar year.

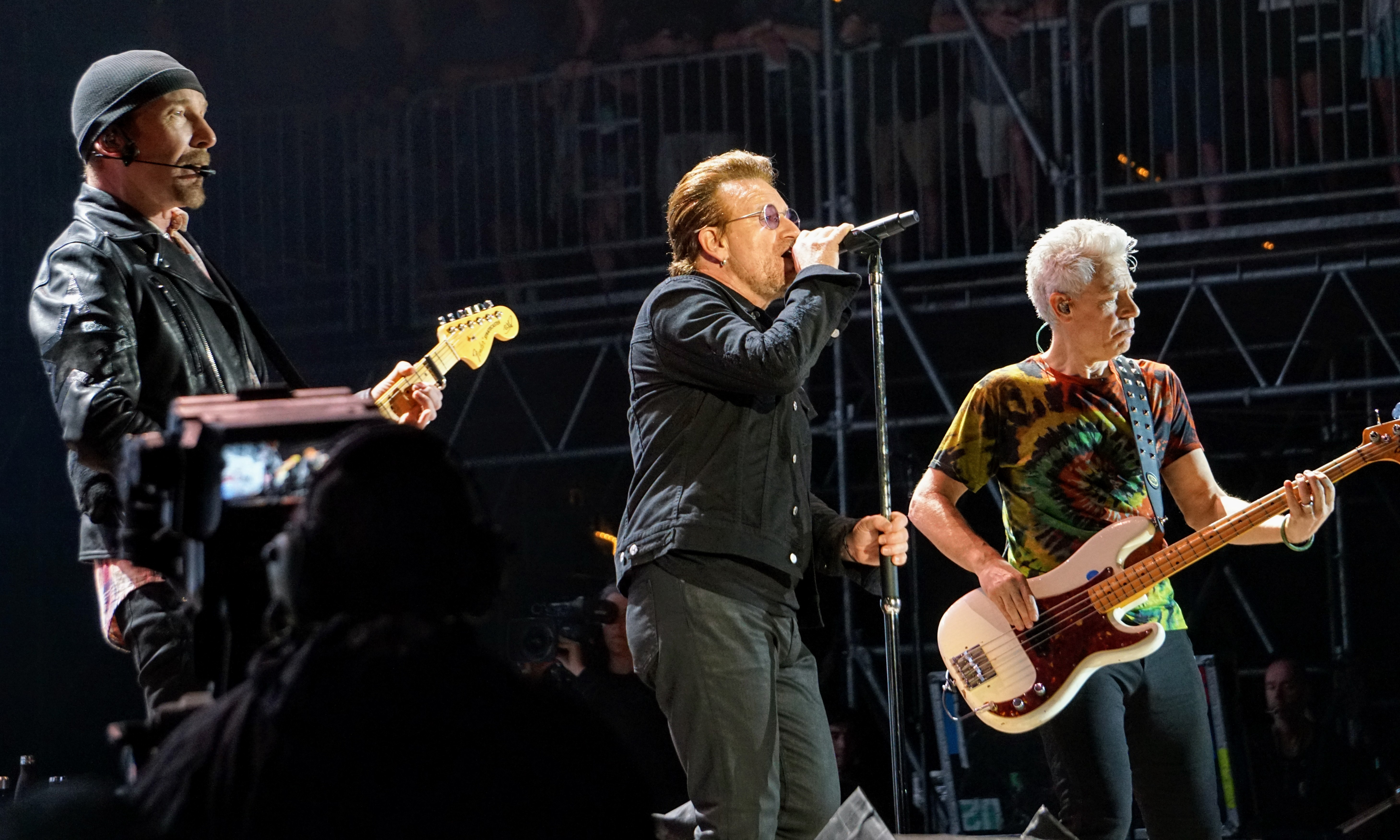
U2 on the Joshua Tree Tour 2017, the most recent of their eight that achieved highest-grossing tour of the year

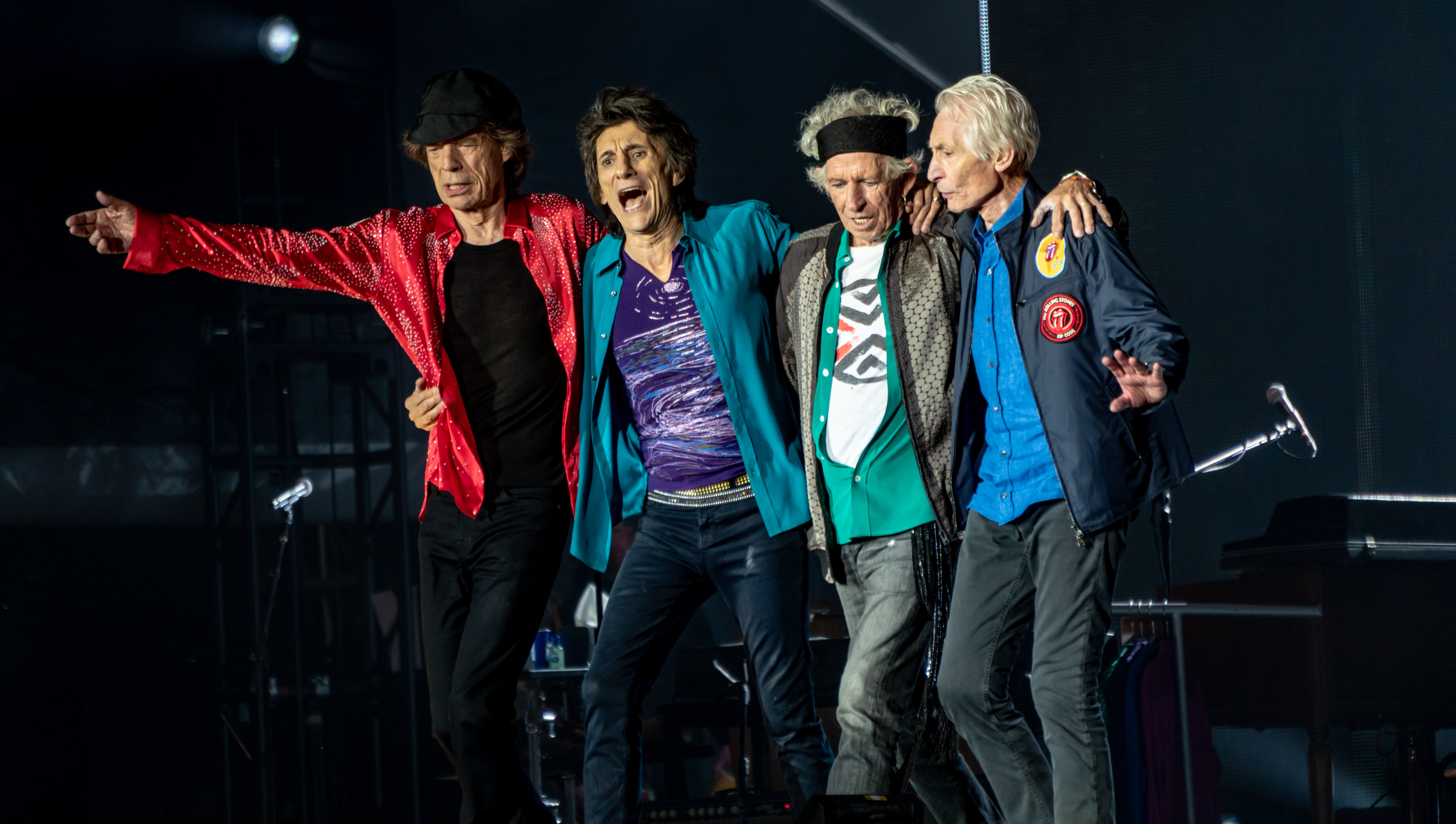
The Rolling Stones on the No Filter Tour, the most recent of their eight that achieved highest-grossing tour of the year

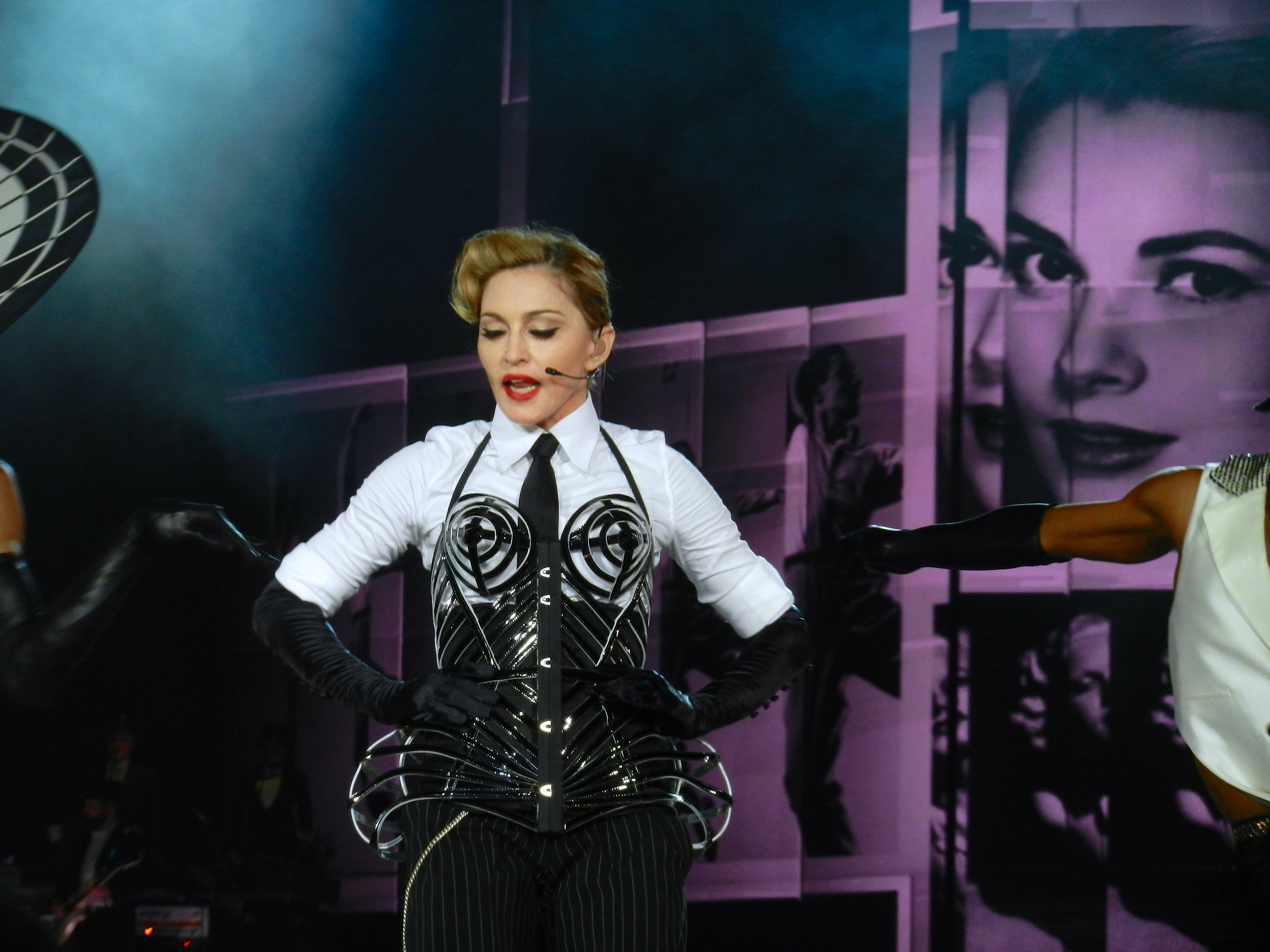
Madonna on the MDNA Tour, the most recent of her three that achieved highest-grossing tour of the year

Highest-grossing tours annually
Year	Actual gross	Adjusted gross (in 2025 dollars)	Artist	Tour title	Shows	Average gross	Ref.
1987	$35,100,000	$99,470,562	U2	The Joshua Tree Tour	79	$444,304	
1988	$27,600,000	$75,135,059	Pink Floyd	A Momentary Lapse of Reason Tour	35	$788,571	
1989	$98,000,000	$254,536,913	The Rolling Stones	Steel Wheels Tour	60	$1,633,333	
1990	$74,100,000	$182,607,616	New Kids on the Block	The Magic Summer Tour	152	$487,500	
1991	$34,700,000	$82,023,577	Grateful Dead	Summer Tour	76	$456,579	
1992	$67,000,000	$153,717,097	U2	Zoo TV Tour	73	$917,808	
1993	$45,600,000	$101,630,961	Grateful Dead	Grateful Dead Tour 1993	81	$562,963	
1994	$121,200,000	$263,271,217	The Rolling Stones	Voodoo Lounge Tour	60	$2,020,000	
1995	$225,668,374	$476,816,230	The Rolling Stones	Voodoo Lounge Tour	84	$2,686,528	
1996	$60,300,000	$123,785,805	Eagles	Hell Freezes Over Tour	45	$1,340,000	
1997	$138,500,000	$277,775,187	U2	PopMart Tour	78	$1,775,641	
1998	$193,350,000	$381,923,489	The Rolling Stones	Bridges to Babylon Tour	82	$2,357,927	
1999	$89,200,000	$172,395,126	The Rolling Stones	No Security Tour	45	$1,982,222	
2000	$122,500,000	$229,021,739	Tina Turner	Twenty Four Seven Tour	108	$1,134,259	
2001	$143,000,000	$260,012,216	U2	Elevation Tour	113	$1,265,487	
2002	$126,100,000	$225,720,167	Paul McCartney	Driving World Tour	58	$2,174,138	
2003	$299,520,230	$524,214,585	The Rolling Stones	Licks Tour	115	$2,604,524	
2004	$125,000,000	$213,068,182	Madonna	Re-Invention World Tour	56	$2,232,143	
2005	$260,000,000	$428,607,940	U2	Vertigo Tour	90	$2,888,889	
2006	$425,100,000	$678,910,944	The Rolling Stones	A Bigger Bang Tour	110	$3,864,545	
2007	$212,227,302	$329,529,634	The Police	Reunion Tour	66	$3,215,565	
2008	$281,600,000	$421,094,281	Madonna	Sticky & Sweet Tour	58	$4,855,172	
2009	$311,637,730	$467,674,118	U2	360° Tour	44	$7,082,676	
2010	$201,100,000	$296,908,668	Bon Jovi	The Circle Tour	80	$2,513,750	
2011	$293,281,487	$419,748,282	U2	360° Tour	44	$6,665,488	
2012	$305,158,363	$427,947,117	Madonna	The MDNA Tour	88	$3,467,709	
2013	$259,500,000	$358,666,071	Bon Jovi	Because We Can	102	$2,544,118	
2014	$290,000,000	$394,398,369	One Direction	Where We Are Tour	69	$4,202,899	
2015	$250,733,097	$340,564,750	Taylor Swift	The 1989 World Tour	85	$2,949,801	
2016	$268,300,000	$359,928,245	Bruce Springsteen · E Street Band	The River Tour 2016	76	$3,530,263	
2017	$316,990,940	$416,357,228	U2	The Joshua Tree Tour 2017	50	$6,339,819	
2018	$432,400,000	$554,395,706	Ed Sheeran	÷ Tour	94	$4,600,000	
2019	$215,200,000	$270,995,705	Pink	Beautiful Trauma World Tour	68	$3,164,706	
2020	$87,100,000	$108,357,014	Elton John	Farewell Yellow Brick Road	38	$2,292,105	
2021	$115,500,000	$137,229,829	The Rolling Stones	No Filter Tour	12	$9,625,000	
2022	$342,192,313	$376,473,804	Coldplay	Music of the Spheres World Tour	64	$5,346,755	
2023	$1,039,263,762	$1,098,173,536	Taylor Swift	The Eras Tour	60	$17,321,063	
2024	$1,043,421,552	$1,070,871,276	Taylor Swift	The Eras Tour	80	$13,042,769	
2025	$407,600,113	$418,323,018	Beyoncé	Cowboy Carter Tour	32	$12,737,504	

== See also ==
- List of highest-grossing live music artists
- List of highest-grossing concert tours by Latin artists
- List of highest-grossing concert tours by women
- List of highest-grossing concert series at a single venue
- List of highest-grossing benefit concerts
- List of most-attended concert tours
- List of most-attended concert series at a single venue
- List of most-attended concerts
