= Paradiso (Fiction Plane album) =

Video by Fiction Plane
- Released: 23 March 2009
- Genre: Alternative rock, indie rock
- Length: 85:12
- Label: XIII Bis Records
- Producer: Justin Kniest and Fabchannel.com

Fiction Plane chronology
| Left Side of the Brain (2007) | Paradiso (2009) | Sparks (2010) |

Paradiso is a live DVD released by the rock band Fiction Plane on 23 March 2009 through XIII Bis Records.

== Recording and production ==
The video was recorded on 7 December 2008 at the band's sold-out performance in Amsterdam at the Paradiso concert venue.

Paradiso was mixed by Ash Howes (Kylie Minogue, James Morrison, Eurythmics) and mastered by Andy Walters (U2, The Cure, Radiohead) at Abbey Road Studios. The cover art was contributed by Alex Lake, who, in addition to supplying the artwork for Fiction Plane's two previous releases Bitter Forces and Lame Race Horses (2005) and Left Side of the Brain (2007), has also worked with Keane, Rufus Wainwright, and Amy Winehouse.

== Release ==
Paradiso was released in two formats: a DVD, and a DVD with a two-CD album. A Blu-ray disc was also planned but never released due to a production error.

Special features on the DVD include the unedited version of the "It's a Lie" video, directed by Jake Sumner, who is the half-brother of Fiction Plane's Joe Sumner and the son of Sting, and a photo gallery of images taken during the band's tour.

The limited edition disc was sold only in France, the Netherlands and Belgium.

== Track list ==
CD 1
| No. | Title | Length |
|---|---|---|
| 1. | "Intro" | 1:14 |
| 2. | "Death Machine" | 3:12 |
| 3. | "Presuppose" | 4:00 |
| 4. | "Running the Country" | 4:33 |
| 5. | "It's a Lie" | 3:16 |
| 6. | "Left Side of the Brain" | 6:16 |
| 7. | "Put On Your Shoes" | 5:13 |
| 8. | "Sadr City Blues" | 6:23 |
| 9. | "Drink" | 6:35 |

CD 2
| No. | Title | Length |
|---|---|---|
| 1. | "Anyone" | 4:22 |
| 2. | "Cut Your Brakes" | 9:19 |
| 3. | "Hate" | 4:41 |
| 4. | "Cross the Line" | 7:20 |
| 5. | "Cigarette" | 8:30 |
| 6. | "Two Sisters" | 10:18 |

DVD
| No. | Title | Length |
|---|---|---|
| 1. | "Intro" | 1:14 |
| 2. | "Death Machine" | 3:10 |
| 3. | "Presuppose" | 4:01 |
| 4. | "Running the Country" | 4:05 |
| 5. | "It's a Lie" | 4:15 |
| 6. | "Left Side of the Brain" | 5:48 |
| 7. | "Put On Your Shoes" | 5:13 |
| 8. | "Sadr City Blues" | 6:19 |
| 9. | "Drink" | 6:35 |
| 10. | "Anyone" | 4:23 |
| 11. | "Cut Your Brakes" | 7:50 |
| 12. | "Hate" | 6:06 |
| 13. | "Cross the Line" | 7:23 |
| 14. | "Cigarette" | 10:04 |
| 15. | "Two Sisters" | 9:42 |

DVD Extras
| No. | Title | Length |
|---|---|---|
| 1. | "It's a Lie" (video uncut) | 3:31 |
| 2. | "It's a Lie" (behind the scenes) | 4:14 |
| 3. | "Photos and tour posters" | 2:08 |
