= Fiction Plane =

Rock band from England

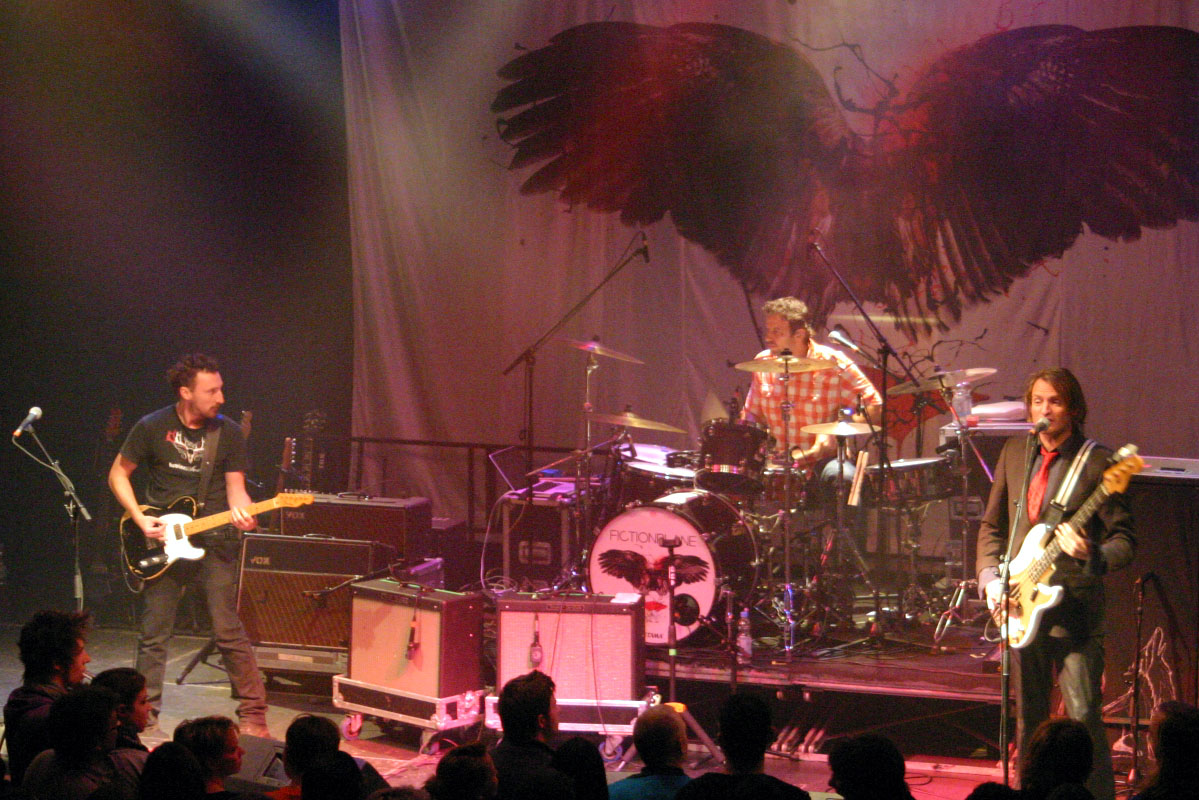
- Fiction Plane in Cologne, Germany in 2010

Background information
- Origin: London, England
- Genres: Alternative rock; post-grunge; indie rock
- Years active: 1999–present
- Labels: MCA; Bieler Bros.; XIII Bis; Roadrunner; Verycords
- Members: Joe Sumner; Seton Daunt; Pete Wilhoit
- Past members: Dan Brown
- Website: fictionplane.band

Fiction Plane are an English rock band consisting of lead vocalist and bass player Joe Sumner, guitarist Seton Daunt, and drummer Pete Wilhoit.

== History ==
When Sumner was a teenager in England, he was inspired to write songs after he heard Nirvana's album Nevermind. Sumner, having grown up around the music industry with his father Gordon “Sting” Sumner, already knew how to play guitar and drums, so he started a band with Dan Brown, a friend from school who played bass. Fiction Plane began to form in 1999 when they were joined by guitarist Seton Daunt.

At a live performance a few years later, they attracted the attention of David Kahne, a producer who escorted them into a studio to record their debut album, Everything Will Never Be OK. Lacking a full-time drummer, they invited Abe Laboriel Jr., a session musician who had played with them before. After the album was released, they hired Pete Wilhoit, a drummer from Bloomington, Indiana, and Fiction Plane was launched.

The band contributed the song "If Only" to the film Holes. The song's lyrics are mostly based on a recurring poem from the film and its source novel. The film's soundtrack album was released in April 2003, only a month after the release of Everything Will Never Be OK.

Following their debut, the band released Bitter Forces and Lame Race Horses (2005), Left Side of the Brain (2007), Paradiso (2009), Sparks (2010), and Mondo Lumina (2015).

Fiction Plane's popularity increased in 2007 when they were the opening act for The Police Reunion Tour - Joe Sumner is the son of Police lead singer Sting. Following a hiatus after the release of Mondo Lumina, the band announced new music in 2026 and joined Sting's Sting 3.0 Tour as special guests, with a six-night residency at the Brooklyn Paramount in November 2026.Fu, Eddie (2 March 2026). "Sting Announces 2026 Fall North American Tour Dates". Consequence of Sound.

== Discography ==
=== Studio albums ===
| Title | Album details | Peak chart positions | | |
| Title | Album details | FRA | NLD | US Heat. |
|---|---|---|---|---|
| Everything Will Never Be OK | Released: 11 March 2003; Label: MCA Records | — | — | — |
| Left Side of the Brain | Released: 22 May 2007; Label: Bieler Bros. Records | 111 | 9 | 46 |
| Sparks | Released: 10 May 2010; Label: Roadrunner Records | 147 | 22 | — |
| Mondo Lumina | Released: 13 November 2015; Label: VERYCORDS | — | — | — |

==== Extended plays ====
| Title | Album details |
|---|---|
| Bitter Forces and Lame Race Horses | Released: 11 July 2005; Label: Universal Records |

==== Live albums ====
| Title | Album details |
|---|---|
| Paradiso | Released: 23 March 2009; Label: XIII Bis Records; Formats: DVD, 2xCD+DVD |

== Band members ==
=== Current ===
- Joe Sumner – lead vocals, bass (1999–present)
- Seton Daunt – guitar (1999–present)
- Pete Wilhoit – drums (1999–present)

=== Former ===
- Dan Brown – bass, keyboards, backing vocals (1999–2006)
