= Seton Daunt =

- Born: Seton Daunt
- Origin: Hastings, Sussex, England
- Genres: Pop, rock, electronic
- Occupations: Guitarist, Songwriter, Producer
- Instruments: Guitar, bass
- Years active: 1998–present
- Labels: MCA records, Roadrunner Records, Geffen Records

Seton Daunt is an English guitar player and songwriter, best known as lead guitarist for the British rock band Fiction Plane.

== Guitarist ==
At 19 years old, Daunt met Dan Brown, who introduced him to Santa's Boyfriend. The band was playing the club circuit in London, and he was invited to join them for a few songs. He joined the band several years later.

In 1998, Daunt was a member of the London-based indie band Bok, which featured Matt Crutchlow (guitar, vocals), Andrew Holdsworth (bass, keyboards), and Richard Young (drums). The band released an EP called "Alarm in the Beehive", which received praise from BBC Radio jockey Steve Lamacq, as well as some positive reviews. Kerrang! gave the album three out of five stars, saying, "'Alarm in the Beehive' boasts the muscular exuberance of Ash with shed-loads of unconventional artistry, head-spinning high velocity twists and turns, and a gnashingly delivered lyric of utter lunacy. In short, this is a mind-warp of soul-stinging genius and definitely worth a look."

In 1999, he became a member of Fiction Plane who went on to record four studio albums, touring extensively with a wide range of acts including Snoop Dogg, The Police and The Bravery.

Daunt has also played guitar for Nelly Furtado, Kylie Minogue, Wilkinson, Sub Focus, Amy Macdonald, 5 Seconds of summer, Yungblud, Everyone you know, Black Honey, Ed Harcourt, Sophie Ellis Bextor, The Feeling, Gabrielle Aplin, Barns Courtney, Leona Lewis, Natalie Imbruglia, James Morrison, Goo Goo Dolls, Jack Savoretti, Newton Faulkner, Delta Heavy, Robin Thicke and One Direction amongst others.

== Songwriting ==
Daunt has co-written with the likes of Barns Courtney, Kylie Minogue, Dean Lewis, Gabrielle Aplin, 5 Seconds of Summer, James Bourne, Yungblud, Black Honey, Everyone You Know and Wilkinson.

== Santa's Boyfriend and Fiction Plane ==
In the spring of 2000, Daunt was asked to join Santa's Boyfriend. Between playing club shows and demoing original material, the band self-produced one album, "Swings and Roundabouts". In 2001, the band played its first US tour with The Funky Meters from New Orleans. At the close of the tour, Santa's Boyfriend performed at the Mercury Lounge in New York, where they began to receive major label interest.

A few months later, the band, under new moniker Fiction Plane, was signed to MCA/Universal. In the summer of 2002, Fiction Plane recorded its debut album, Everything Will Never Be OK with producer David Kahne and engineer Joe Barresi in Los Angeles. Fiction Plane spent 2003 and 2004 touring and promoting the album in the US and Japan until MCA folded into Geffen Records.

During the band's downtime, Daunt began to engage in session work (see Discography below).

In 2005, Fiction Plane recorded and released the Bitter Forces and Lame Race Horses EP for the Geffen imprint, Everybody's Records. The EP was produced by Paul Corkett, with whom the band continues to record to this day. The band promoted the release with a short UK tour as well as opening for Sting in America and Europe as part of his Broken Music tour. Rob Mccarthy

In 2007, Fiction Plane recorded and released Left Side of the Brain for indie label Bieler Bros. Records. The band proceeded to tour the world as the opener for The Police's anniversary reunion tour. They followed that up with tours with The Feeling, The Bravery, and the 2008 Summer Unity Tour with 311 and Snoop Dogg.

In 2009, Fiction Plane released the live album, Paradiso, and plans to record a brand new studio album later in the year.

== Solo work ==
Outside of Fiction Plane, Daunt works with The Daunting, a Desert Folk band, in which he collaborates with his wife, Halima. The band plays in and around London from time to time and plans to release an album. The Daunting's acoustic-based sound has been compared to Mazzy Star and Isobel Campbell.

Daunt has also produced a few tracks for his brother Will's band, The Molotovs. Songs produced included "City's Guest" and "In Conversation".

On 16 January 2009, Daunt performed with Icelandic singer Emiliana Torrini on the French television program Taratata, playing guitar on her single "Jungle Drum".

Daunt recorded guitars for the track "Hearts Collide" for UK artist Little Boots' debut album Hands, which was released in June 2009.

== Equipment ==
Daunt uses the following equipment live and in the studio: Guitars:

- Fender Nocaster Custom shop, Black with 59" neck pick-up & Fralin Bridge Pickup (used for touring 2007 – 2008)
- Fender Telecaster Custom Shop, Blonde (used on Left Side of the Brain)
- Fender Telecaster Custom Shop Rosewood
- Gibson Les Paul Standard, Black, (used on Everything Will Never Be OK and Bitter Forces and Lame Race Horses)
- First Act Modified Delia, Black, (used with The Daunting)
- Gibson Hummingbird Acoustic guitar

Amplification:

- Vox AC30, Top Boost
- 65 Amps, London

Effects:

- Pete Cornish Boost / Loop / Mute
- Pete Cornish G2
- Pete Cornish SS3
- DigiTech Whammy
- Lovepedal Eternity Overdrive
- Ibanez Tube Screamer by Analog Man
- Menatone Red Snapper
- Dunlop Wah Wah
- Eventide Timefactor Delay
- Eventide H9

Other:

- GHS Strings
- Pete Cornish Cables
- Evidence Audio Cables
- Apogee electronics

Equipment used in recording 2010 album Sparks:

- Fender Custom Shop Jaguar Baritone
- Way Huge Swollen Pickle
- MXR script Dyna Comp
- MXR tremolo
- Echoplex EP-3
- Pete Cornish P – 2
- Pete Cornish LP – 1

== Selected discography ==
- Alarm in the Beehive (1999) by Bok
- Swings & Roundabouts (2001) by Santa's Boyfriend
- Everything Will Never Be OK (2003) by Fiction Plane
- Holes motion picture soundtrack (2003) ~ contributed the song "If Only" by Fiction Plane
- Bitter Forces and Lame Race Horses (2005) by Fiction Plane
- Left Side of the Brain (2007) by Fiction Plane
- Paradiso (2009) by Fiction Plane

=== As session guitarist ===
- Everything's Eventual (2003) by Appleton
- Guilty (2003) by Blue
- Introduction (2004) by Alex Parks
- Some Day Soon (2004) by Kristian Leontiou
- Counting Down the Days (2005) by Natalie Imbruglia
- Honesty (2005) by Alex Parks
- Lee Ryan (2005) by Lee Ryan
- All Good Things single (2006) by Nelly Furtado
- Taller in More Ways (2006) by Sugababes
- In God's Hands single (2007) by Nelly Furtado
- This Is the Life (2007) by Amy MacDonald
- Lost Without U single (2007) by Robin Thicke
- Down on My Knees single (2007) by Ayọ
- X (2007) by Kylie Minogue
- Songs for You, Truths for Me (2008) by James Morrison
- Hands (2009) by Little Boots
- Golden (2018) by Kylie Minogue
