= Everything Will Never Be OK =

Studio album by Fiction Plane
- Released: 11 March 2003
- Genre: Alternative rock, indie rock
- Length: 53:51
- Label: MCA Records
- Producer: David Kahne

Fiction Plane chronology
Everything Will Never Be OK (2003)	Bitter Forces and Lame Race Horses (2005)

Professional ratings
Review scores
Source	Rating
AllMusic	4/5 stars
Entertainment Weekly	4/5 stars
Rolling Stone	2/5 stars

Everything Will Never Be OK is the debut album by the rock band Fiction Plane. The track "Wise" contains the hidden track "Bongo" after five minutes of silence (making the track's total running time 15:50).

== Track listing ==
All songs written by Fiction Plane.

1. "Listen to My Babe" – 2:43
2. "Everything Will Never Be OK" – 3:20
3. "Cigarette" – 3:28
4. "Hate" – 3:35
5. "Soldier Machismo" – 2:39
6. "I Wish I Would Die" – 3:38
7. "Fallow" – 4:09
8. "Real Real" – 3:57
9. "Everybody Lies" – 3:24
10. "Sickness" – 3:53
11. "Silence" – 3:21
12. "Wise" – 4:00 / "Bongo" (hidden track) – 6:50

== Personnel ==
- Joe Sumner – vocals, guitar, additional drums
- Dan Brown – bass, backing vocals, keyboards
- Seton Daunt – guitar
- Abe Laboriel Jr. - drums
