= Bitter Forces and Lame Race Horses =

EP by Fiction Plane
- Released: 11 July 2005
- Genre: Alternative rock
- Length: 17:13
- Label: Geffen, Everybody's Records
- Producer: Paul Corkett & Fiction Plane

Fiction Plane chronology
Everything Will Never Be OK (2003)	Bitter Forces and Lame Race Horses (2005)	Left Side of the Brain (2007)

Bitter Forces and Lame Race Horses is an EP by the rock band Fiction Plane, released on 11 July 2005.

== Critical reception ==
In a review for AllMusic, Mark Morton wrote that the EP is "darker in nature" than Fiction Plane's debut album, Everything Will Never Be OK (2003), and described it as a "soulful, somber, and acidic ... successful hybrid of alternative rock balladry and singer-songwriter affectation."

== Track listing ==
No.	Title	Length
1.	"American Standard"	3:43
2.	"Patience"	4:43
3.	"Author Lies"	3:59
4.	"Tolerate"	4:48

== Personnel ==
Fiction Plane

- Seton Daunt – guitar, piano, background vocals
- Joe Sumner – vocals, bass, guitar
- Pete Wilhoit – drums, background vocals

Additional personnel

- Paul Corkett – engineering, mixing, production
- Nick Joplin – engineering
- Mark "Spike" Stent – mixing
- Dan K. Brown – design, illustrations, photography
- Alex Lake – design, illustrations, photography
