= The Police Reunion Tour =

2007–2008 concert tour by the Police

- Tour by The Police
- Start date: 28 May 2007
- End date: 7 August 2008
- Legs: 9
- No. of shows: 152
- Supporting acts: Arno Carstens; The B-52s; Beck; The Charlatans; Counting Crows; Elvis Costello & the Imposters; Fergie; Fiction Plane; Foo Fighters; The Fratellis; KT Tunstall; Maroon 5; Maxïmo Park; Os Paralamas do Sucesso; Sloan; Starsailor
- Box office: US$362 million

The Police concert chronology
- A Conspiracy of Hope (1986); Reunion Tour (2007–2008); N/A

The Reunion Tour was a 2007–2008 worldwide concert tour by the Police, marking the 30th anniversary of their beginnings. At its conclusion, the tour became, at the time, the third highest-grossing tour in history, with revenues reaching over $360 million. The tour began in May 2007 to overwhelmingly positive reviews from fans and critics alike and ended in August 2008 with a final show at Madison Square Garden.

== History ==
On 24 January 2007, Rock101, a radio station in Vancouver, British Columbia, reported the trio was coming together again and had begun tour rehearsals in Vancouver. There were numerous sightings of the group and their entourage in the Vancouver area as expectation built of such a tour.

The reunited Police performed at the 49th Annual Grammy Awards on 11 February 2007 in Los Angeles. On 12 February, the Police held rehearsals and a press conference for the media at the Whisky a Go Go in Los Angeles, where they confirmed they would be undertaking the world tour starting in Vancouver in May. It was also announced the opening act for the North American and European legs of the tour would be Fiction Plane, a pop-rock band from England featuring lead singer and bass guitarist Joe Sumner, the son of Sting. In Philadelphia, Scottish rock band the Fratellis also joined Fiction Plane as an opening act. In addition, Maroon 5 joined the bill in Miami and Maxïmo Park joined the Police and Fiction Plane on the Twickenham dates, London.

Since concert tickets went up for sale worldwide, some concert dates were sold out in minutes. Tickets for the entire British tour, the band's first in 24 years, sold out within 30 minutes. Worldwide, they sold about 1.5m tickets with revenues reaching $168m.

The Police and Best Buy released a collector's set on 7 October 2008 entitled Certifiable: Live in Buenos Aires, which includes an entire concert recorded live in Buenos Aires, Argentina on the tour. The set came in the following packages: 2DVD/2CD, 1 Blu-ray Disc/2CD, and 3 premium 180-gram vinyl LPs with MP3 file key. The set also included bonus footage, including a documentary shot by Copeland's son Jordan entitled Better Than Therapy.

The tour was a finalist for the Billboard 2008 Touring Awards for Top Tour and Top Draw. The 2008 portions came in fourth in Billboard's grosses rankings for that year.

== The show ==
The first show was a preview concert in Vancouver, for 4,000 members of the band's fan club, on 27 May 2007. The first official show was on 28 May 2007 in front of 22,000 fans at one of two nearly sold-out shows. Opening with "Message in a Bottle", the band performed for roughly two hours, playing mostly hits with a smattering of fan favourites.

While the Vancouver concerts received overwhelmingly positive reviews from critics, drummer Stewart Copeland, in a forum posting on his official site, called the band's 29 May performance "lame" and took humorous pokes at himself and his bandmates. He called one of Sting's song-ending leaps that of a "petulant pansy instead of the god of rock", joked the band botched the key changes so thoroughly they ended up playing "avant-garde twelve-tone hodgepodges" of "Every Little Thing She Does Is Magic" and "Don't Stand So Close to Me", suggested that guitarist Andy Summers was "in Idaho" when he and Sting ended up half a bar out of sync with each other during opener "Message in a Bottle", and claimed he "made a hash" out of a fill he had worked out for in "Walking in Your Footsteps" by playing it in the wrong part of the song. In spite of these glitches, however, he said he was enjoying himself and after the set he and his bandmates fell into each other's arms backstage, laughing.

"It was a sincere criticism," Copeland explained. "If you read the piece in context, it wasn't that vitriolic. It was an acknowledgement that we were only human. And we were struggling to make it work, playing as if our lives depended on it, and we still had to get it right… When Sting and Andy first read it, they were like, 'Oww!' But then they got over it."

== Stage design ==
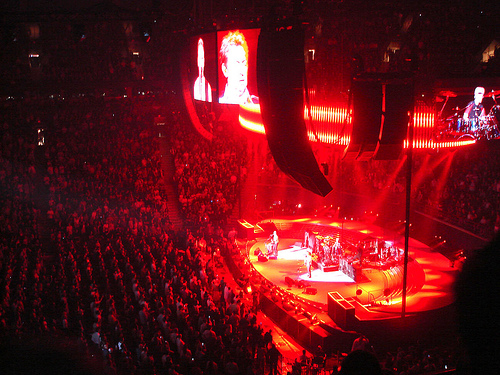
The Police performing "Roxanne" on 28 May 2007 at GM Place, Vancouver

The stage setup for the Police was a simple split-level oval design, ringed with blue lights. Above the stage were seven LED screens—three in the front of the stage, one on each side and two in the rear. The setup was not used during the show in The Woodlands on 20 May 2008 due to the smaller stage at the venue. In Marseille, France on 3 June 2008, the screens were used but not the split-level oval stage setup.

The placement of the band members echoed that of previous tours, with Sting and his bass equipment located stage-right, with Andy Summers and his guitar pedals and amps on stage-left. Stewart Copeland was located in the center rear. Behind him on a platform that could be raised and lowered, was a percussion setup consisting of various timpanis, hanging rotosounds, tuned percussion kits, and digital xylophone centered by a 60" gong used on various songs.

== Set list ==
This set list is representative of the performance in Mountain View on 14 July 2008. It does not represent all concerts for the duration of the tour.

1. "Message in a Bottle"
2. "Walking on the Moon"
3. "Demolition Man"
4. "Voices in My Head"
5. "When the World Is Running Down, You Make the Best of What's Still Around"
6. "Don't Stand So Close to Me"
7. "Driven to Tears"
8. "Hole in My Life"
9. "Every Little Thing She Does Is Magic"
10. "Wrapped Around Your Finger"
11. "De Do Do Do, De Da Da Da"
12. "Invisible Sun"
13. "Can't Stand Losing You"/"Reggatta de Blanc"
14. "Roxanne"
15. "King of Pain"
16. "So Lonely"
17. "Every Breath You Take"
18. "Next to You"

Other songs played throughout the tour were "Synchronicity II" and "Walking in Your Footsteps". Other songs played in 2007 were "Truth Hits Everybody", "The Bed's Too Big Without You", "Spirits in the Material World", "Dead End Job" and "Murder by Numbers". All were replaced by "Bring on the Night" in 2008.

Jimi Hendrix's "Purple Haze" and Cream's "Sunshine of Your Love" were added for the final concert on 7 August 2008 at Madison Square Garden.

== Tour dates ==
List of concerts, showing date, city, country, venue, opening act, tickets sold, number of available tickets and amount of gross revenue
Date	City	Country	Venue	Opening act	Attendance	Revenue
Leg 1 — North America
27 May 2007	Vancouver	Canada	General Motors Place	Fiction Plane	4,000 / 4,000 Fanclub Only Show	$200,000
28 May 2007	Vancouver	Canada	General Motors Place	Fiction Plane	37,018 / 37,018	$4,046,518
29 May 2007	Vancouver	Canada	General Motors Place	Fiction Plane	37,018 / 37,018	$4,046,518
2 June 2007	Edmonton	Canada	Commonwealth Stadium	Sloan; Fiction Plane	29,592 / 29,592	$3,216,118
6 June 2007	Seattle	United States	KeyArena	Fiction Plane	29,022 / 29,022	$3,314,875
7 June 2007	Seattle	United States	KeyArena	Fiction Plane	29,022 / 29,022	$3,314,875
9 June 2007	Denver	United States	Pepsi Center	Fiction Plane	33,736 / 33,736	$3,762,755
10 June 2007	Denver	United States	Pepsi Center	Fiction Plane	33,736 / 33,736	$3,762,755
13 June 2007	Oakland	United States	McAfee Coliseum	The Fratellis; Fiction Plane	47,202 / 47,202	$4,572,620
15 June 2007	Las Vegas	United States	MGM Grand Garden Arena	Fiction Plane	16,165 / 16,165	$2,863,954
16 June 2007	Manchester	United States	Bonnaroo Music and Arts Festival	—N/a	—N/a	—N/a
18 June 2007	Phoenix	United States	US Airways Center	Fiction Plane	16,710 / 16,710	$1,970,365
20 June 2007	Los Angeles	United States	Staples Center	Fiction Plane	17,036 / 17,036	$2,656,145
21 June 2007	Anaheim	United States	Honda Center	Fiction Plane	13,663 / 13,663	$2,059,675
23 June 2007	Los Angeles	United States	Dodger Stadium	Foo Fighters; Fiction Plane	55,623 / 55,623	$6,106,010
26 June 2007	Dallas	United States	American Airlines Center	Fiction Plane	33,708 / 33,708	$3,784,600
27 June 2007	Dallas	United States	American Airlines Center	Fiction Plane	33,708 / 33,708	$3,784,600
29 June 2007	Houston	United States	Toyota Center	Fiction Plane	16,651 / 16,651	$1,847,945
30 June 2007	New Orleans	United States	New Orleans Arena	Fiction Plane	15,992 / 15,992	$1,677,470
2 July 2007	St. Louis	United States	Scottrade Center	Fiction Plane	17,821 / 17,821	$1,872,140
3 July 2007	Saint Paul	United States	Xcel Energy Center	Fiction Plane	17,185 / 17,185	$1,943,310
5 July 2007	Chicago	United States	Wrigley Field	Fiction Plane	79,458 / 79,458	$9,494,248
6 July 2007	Chicago	United States	Wrigley Field	Fiction Plane	79,458 / 79,458	$9,494,248
7 July 2007	East Rutherford	United States	Giants Stadium (This concert was part of Live Earth)	—N/a	—N/a	—N/a
10 July 2007	Miami Gardens	United States	Dolphin Stadium	Maroon 5 Fiction Plane	46,105 / 46,105	$5,094,870
11 July 2007	Tampa	United States	St. Pete Times Forum	Fiction Plane	18,690 / 18,690	$2,064,875
14 July 2007	Louisville	United States	Churchill Downs	Fiction Plane	25,413 / 25,413	$2,899,375
16 July 2007	Cleveland	United States	Quicken Loans Arena	Fiction Plane	18,881 / 18,881	$1,885,040
17 July 2007	Auburn Hills	United States	The Palace of Auburn Hills	Fiction Plane	19,342 / 19,342	$2,069,428
19 July 2007	Philadelphia	United States	Citizens Bank Park	The Fratellis; Fiction Plane	42,599 / 42,599	$4,128,705
20 July 2007	Hershey	United States	Hersheypark Stadium	Fiction Plane	30,318 / 30,318	$3,101,630
22 July 2007	Toronto	Canada	Air Canada Centre	Fiction Plane	38,031 / 38,031	$4,456,636
23 July 2007	Toronto	Canada	Air Canada Centre	Fiction Plane	38,031 / 38,031	$4,456,636
25 July 2007	Montreal	Canada	Bell Centre	Fiction Plane	41,275 / 41,275	$4,571,063
26 July 2007	Montreal	Canada	Bell Centre	Fiction Plane	41,275 / 41,275	$4,571,063
28 July 2007	Boston	United States	Fenway Park	Fiction Plane	67,154 / 67,154	$7,644,400
29 July 2007	Boston	United States	Fenway Park	Fiction Plane	67,154 / 67,154	$7,644,400
31 July 2007	East Hartford	United States	Rentschler Field	Fiction Plane	32,450 / 32,450	$3,318,015
1 August 2007	New York City	United States	Madison Square Garden	Fiction Plane	37,487 / 37,387	$4,753,610
3 August 2007	New York City	United States	Madison Square Garden	Fiction Plane	37,487 / 37,387	$4,753,610
4 August 2007	Baltimore	United States	Virgin Festival	—N/a	—N/a	—N/a
5 August 2007	East Rutherford	United States	Giants Stadium	The Fratellis; Fiction Plane	55,247 / 55,247	$6,415,610
Leg 2 — Europe
29 August 2007	Stockholm	Sweden	Globe Arena	Fiction Plane	24,286 / 24,286	$2,098,632
30 August 2007	Stockholm	Sweden	Globe Arena	Fiction Plane	24,286 / 24,286	$2,098,632
1 September 2007	Aarhus	Denmark	Vestereng	Fiction Plane	38,000 / 45,000	—N/a
4 September 2007	Birmingham	England	National Indoor Arena	Fiction Plane	24,099 / 24,099	$3,579,363
5 September 2007	Birmingham	England	National Indoor Arena	Fiction Plane	24,099 / 24,099	$3,579,363
8 September 2007	Twickenham	England	Twickenham Stadium	Maxïmo Park; Fiction Plane	104,417 / 104,417	$15,369,280
9 September 2007	Twickenham	England	Twickenham Stadium	Maxïmo Park; Fiction Plane	104,417 / 104,417	$15,369,280
11 September 2007	Hamburg	Germany	AOL Arena	Fiction Plane	29,150 / 34,596	$3,191,128
13 September 2007	Amsterdam	Netherlands	Amsterdam Arena	Fiction Plane	93,211 / 93,790	$10,216,228
14 September 2007	Amsterdam	Netherlands	Amsterdam Arena	Fiction Plane	93,211 / 93,790	$10,216,228
16 September 2007	Geneva	Switzerland	Stade de Genève	Fiction Plane	21,878 / 21,878	$2,238,986
19 September 2007	Vienna	Austria	Wiener Stadthalle	Fiction Plane	15,463 / 15,463	$1,460,708
22 September 2007	Munich	Germany	Olympiastadion	Fiction Plane	44,740 / 44,740	$4,451,894
25 September 2007	Lisbon	Portugal	Estádio Nacional	—N/a	—N/a	—N/a
27 September 2007	Barcelona	Spain	Estadi Olímpic Lluís Companys	Fiction Plane	54,553 / 54,553	$5,554,320
29 September 2007	Paris	France	Stade de France	Fiction Plane	157,906 / 157,906	$15,319,076
30 September 2007	Paris	France	Stade de France	Fiction Plane	157,906 / 157,906	$15,319,076
2 October 2007	Turin	Italy	Stadio delle Alpi	Fiction Plane	62,604 / 62,604	$5,164,887
6 October 2007	Dublin	Ireland	Croke Park	Fiction Plane	81,640 / 81,640	$11,837,425
8 October 2007	Antwerp	Belgium	Sportpaleis	Fiction Plane	17,905 / 17,905	$2,002,164
19 October 2007	Cardiff	Wales	Millennium Stadium	The Fratellis; Fiction Plane	48,065 / 48,065	$5,964,008
20 October 2007	London	England	Wembley Arena	Fiction Plane	11,301 / 11,301	$1,852,912
Leg 3 — North America
31 October 2007	New York City	United States	Madison Square Garden	Fiction Plane	34,961 / 34,961	$4,530,450
2 November 2007	New York City	United States	Madison Square Garden	Fiction Plane	34,961 / 34,961	$4,530,450
4 November 2007	Atlantic City	United States	Boardwalk Hall	—N/a	12,394 / 12,394	$2,440,331
5 November 2007	Washington, D.C.	United States	Verizon Center	Fiction Plane	14,050 / 14,050	$1,676,406
6 November 2007	Charlottesville	United States	John Paul Jones Arena	Fiction Plane	10,496 / 10,496	$1,075,090
8 November 2007	Toronto	Canada	Air Canada Centre	Fiction Plane	31,286 / 31,286	$3,828,654
9 November 2007	Toronto	Canada	Air Canada Centre	Fiction Plane	31,286 / 31,286	$3,828,654
11 November 2007	Boston	United States	TD Banknorth Garden	Fiction Plane	14,256 / 14,256	$1,804,535
12 November 2007	Montreal	Canada	Bell Centre	Fiction Plane	12,615 / 12,615	$1,419,151
15 November 2007	Charlotte	United States	Charlotte Bobcats Arena	Fiction Plane	13,741 / 13,741	$1,523,560
17 November 2007	Atlanta	United States	Philips Arena	Fiction Plane	27,665 / 27,665	$3,249,155
18 November 2007	Atlanta	United States	Philips Arena	Fiction Plane	27,665 / 27,665	$3,249,155
20 November 2007	San Antonio	United States	AT&T Center	Fiction Plane	8,967 / 8,967	$978,905
Leg 4 — Latin America				Fiction Plane		
24 November 2007	Mexico City	Mexico	Foro Sol	Fiction Plane	47,027 / 58,374	$2,545,113
27 November 2007	Monterrey	Mexico	Arena Monterrey	Fiction Plane	12,552 / 12,552	$1,298,400
28 November 2007	Monterrey	Mexico	Arena Monterrey		12,552 / 12,552	$1,298,400
1 December 2007	Buenos Aires	Argentina	River Plate Stadium	Beck	87,967 / 87,967	$4,972,415
2 December 2007	Buenos Aires	Argentina	River Plate Stadium	Beck	87,967 / 87,967	$4,972,415
5 December 2007	Santiago	Chile	Estadio Nacional de Chile	Beck	48,725 / 48,725	$2,767,710
8 December 2007	Rio de Janeiro	Brazil	Maracanã Stadium	Os Paralamas do Sucesso	59,200 / 59,200	$5,410,606
11 December 2007	San Juan	Puerto Rico	Coliseo de Puerto Rico	Fiction Plane	11,089 / 11,089	$1,203,483
Leg 5 — Oceania
17 January 2008	Wellington	New Zealand	Westpac Stadium	Fergie; Fiction Plane	21,614 / 21,614	$2,156,344
19 January 2008	Auckland	New Zealand	Western Springs Stadium	Fergie; Fiction Plane	26,665 / 26,665	$2,397,286
22 January 2008	Brisbane	Australia	Suncorp Stadium	Fergie; Fiction Plane	25,928 / 25,928	$3,306,646
24 January 2008	Sydney	Australia	ANZ Stadium	Fergie; Fiction Plane	43,725 / 43,725	$4,840,514
26 January 2008	Melbourne	Australia	Melbourne Cricket Ground	Fergie; Fiction Plane	29,655 / 29,655	$3,865,205
28 January 2008	Adelaide	Australia	Adelaide Entertainment Centre	Fergie; Fiction Plane	13,950 / 13,950	$1,502,462
29 January 2008	Adelaide	Australia	Adelaide Entertainment Centre	Fergie; Fiction Plane	13,950 / 13,950	$1,502,462
1 February 2008	Perth	Australia	Members Equity Stadium	Fergie; Fiction Plane	36,518 / 36,518	$4,340,778
2 February 2008	Perth	Australia	Members Equity Stadium	Fergie; Fiction Plane	36,518 / 36,518	$4,340,778
Leg 6 — Asia
4 February 2008	Singapore		Singapore Indoor Stadium	Fiction Plane	10,690 / 10,690	$2,002,692
7 February 2008	Macau		Venetian Arena	Fiction Plane	7,416 / 7,416	$919,527
10 February 2008	Osaka	Japan	Osaka Dome	Fiction Plane	21,526 / 21,526	$2,763,164
13 February 2008	Tokyo	Japan	Tokyo Dome	Fiction Plane	56,706 / 56,706	$7,062,008
14 February 2008	Tokyo	Japan	Tokyo Dome	Fiction Plane	56,706 / 56,706	$7,062,008
Leg 7 — North America
16 February 2008	Honolulu	United States	Blaisdell Arena	Fiction Plane	16,444 / 16,444	$2,192,890
17 February 2008	Honolulu	United States	Blaisdell Arena	Fiction Plane	16,444 / 16,444	$2,192,890
1 May 2008	Ottawa	Canada	Scotiabank Place	Elvis Costello & The Imposters	10,509 / 10,509	$1,245,428
3 May 2008	Buffalo	United States	HSBC Arena	Elvis Costello & The Imposters	12,091 / 12,091	$1,146,350
4 May 2008	Columbus	United States	Nationwide Arena	Elvis Costello & The Imposters	11,438 / 11,438	$1,088,290
10 May 2008	Rosemont	United States	Allstate Arena	Elvis Costello & The Imposters	12,471 / 12,471	$1,589,480
11 May 2008	Grand Rapids	United States	Van Andel Arena	Elvis Costello & The Imposters	7,624 / 7,624	$690,620
13 May 2008	Kansas City	United States	Sprint Center	Elvis Costello & The Imposters	12,314 / 12,314	$1,378,942
14 May 2008	Omaha	United States	Qwest Center	Elvis Costello & The Imposters	10,701 / 10,701	$1,134,045
16 May 2008	Orlando	United States	Amway Arena	Elvis Costello & The Imposters	11,972 / 11,972	$1,378,670
17 May 2008	West Palm Beach	United States	Cruzan Amphitheatre	Elvis Costello & The Imposters	18,523 / 18,523	$1,416,930
20 May 2008	The Woodlands	United States	Cynthia Woods Mitchell Pavilion	Elvis Costello & The Imposters	11,624 / 11,624	$1,020,092
21 May 2008	Dallas	United States	SuperPages.com Center	Elvis Costello & The Imposters	10,305 / 10,305	$859,730
23 May 2008	Paradise	United States	MGM Grand Garden Arena	Elvis Costello & The Imposters	9,697 / 9,697	$1,694,228
24 May 2008	Phoenix	United States	Cricket Wireless Pavilion	Elvis Costello & The Imposters	10,765 / 10,765	$909,320
26 May 2008	Chula Vista	United States	Coors Amphitheatre	Elvis Costello & The Imposters	17,764 / 17,764	$1,681,110
27 May 2008	Los Angeles	United States	Hollywood Bowl	Elvis Costello & The Imposters	32,730 / 33,270	$3,854,713
28 May 2008	Los Angeles	United States	Hollywood Bowl	Elvis Costello & The Imposters	32,730 / 33,270	$3,854,713
Leg 8 — Europe
3 June 2008	Marseille	France	Stade Vélodrome	The Charlatans	47,337 / 47,337	$5,290,050
5 June 2008	Mannheim	Germany	SAP Arena	The Charlatans	13,735 / 13,735	$1,510,408
7 June 2008	Werchter	Belgium	TW Classic	The Charlatans		
8 June 2008	Düsseldorf	Germany	LTU Arena	The Charlatans	46,000 / 46,894	$5,139,564
10 June 2008	Saint-Étienne	France	Stade Geoffroy-Guichard		28,964 / 38,193	$2,721,354
12 June 2008	Zürich	Switzerland	Hallenstadion	Starsailor	8,896 / 8,896	$839,957
15 June 2008	Newport	England	Isle of Wight Festival	—N/a	—N/a	—N/a
17 June 2008	Manchester	England	Manchester Evening News Arena	Starsailor	35,603 / 35,603	$4,578,672
18 June 2008	Manchester	England	Manchester Evening News Arena	Starsailor	35,603 / 35,603	$4,578,672
20 June 2008	Belfast	Northern Ireland	Stormont Castle	KT Tunstall	10,588 / 15,000	$1,313,814
22 June 2008	Venice	Italy	Parco San Giuliano	—N/a	24,000 / 24,000	$1,575,246
24 June 2008	Belgrade	Serbia	Ušće	Counting Crows	27,104 / 35,000	$1,309,651
26 June 2008	Chorzów	Poland	Silesian Stadium	Counting Crows	47,693 / 47,693	$3,137,631
28 June 2008	Leipzig	Germany	Messehalle	Arno Carstens	17,544 / 17,544	$1,531,333
29 June 2008	London	England	Hard Rock Calling	—N/a	30,000 / 30,000	$3,239,956
2 July 2008	Valencia	Spain	Estadio Ciudad de Valencia	Starsailor	17,352 / 17,352	$2,193,508
4 July 2008	Bilbao	Spain	Bilbao BBK Live	—N/a	31,500 / 31,500	$4,392,327
5 July 2008	Madrid	Spain	Rock in Rio Madrid	—N/a	43,843 / 43,843	$3,881,852
Leg 9 — North America
11 July 2008	Ridgefield	United States	Amphitheater at Clark County	Elvis Costello & The Imposters	14,253 / 14,253	$1,195,200
12 July 2008	George	United States	The Gorge Amphitheatre	Elvis Costello & The Imposters	10,255 / 10,255	$1,150,923
14 July 2008	Mountain View	United States	Shoreline Amphitheatre	Elvis Costello & The Imposters	16,084 / 16,084	$1,301,091
16 July 2008	Concord	United States	Sleep Train Pavilion	Elvis Costello & The Imposters	11,673 / 11,673	$951,206
17 July 2008	Wheatland	United States	Sleep Train Amphitheatre	Elvis Costello & The Imposters	10,519 / 10,519	$810,149
19 July 2008	West Valley City	United States	USANA Amphitheatre	Elvis Costello & The Imposters	15,655 / 15,655	$1,142,350
21 July 2008	Morrison	United States	Red Rocks Amphitheatre	Elvis Costello & The Imposters	17,313 / 17,313	$2,520,256
22 July 2008	Morrison	United States	Red Rocks Amphitheatre	Elvis Costello & The Imposters	17,313 / 17,313	$2,520,256
25 July 2008	Milwaukee	United States	Marcus Amphitheater	Elvis Costello & The Imposters	15,042 / 23,000	$1,349,740
26 July 2008	Clarkston	United States	DTE Energy Music Theatre	Elvis Costello & The Imposters	14,696 / 14,696	$1,324,029
28 July 2008	Burgettstown	United States	Post-Gazette Pavilion	Elvis Costello & The Imposters	13,431 / 13,431	$867,200
29 July 2008	Philadelphia	United States	Wachovia Center	Elvis Costello & The Imposters	11,133 / 12,415	$1,270,215
31 July 2008	Mansfield	United States	Comcast Center	Elvis Costello & The Imposters	13,523 / 13,523	$1,352,730
1 August 2008	Saratoga Springs	United States	Saratoga Performing Arts Center	Elvis Costello & The Imposters	19,010 / 19,010	$1,504,138
3 August 2008	Holmdel	United States	PNC Bank Arts Center	Elvis Costello & The Imposters	16,857 / 16,857	$1,537,688
4 August 2008	Wantagh	United States	Nikon at Jones Beach Theater	Elvis Costello & The Imposters	27,089 / 27,089	$3,655,783
5 August 2008	Wantagh	United States	Nikon at Jones Beach Theater	Elvis Costello & The Imposters	27,089 / 27,089	$3,655,783
7 August 2008	New York City	United States	Madison Square Garden	The B-52's	18,348 / 18,348	$2,754,050
Total					3,361,794 / 3,403,419 (98%)	$361,956,184

== See also ==
- List of highest-grossing concert tours
