= The Stewart Copeland Anthology =

Compilation album by Stewart Copeland
- Released: August 14, 2007
- Genres: Pop, rock, world
- Length: 67:16
- Label: Koch
- Producer: Derek Power

Stewart Copeland chronology
La notte della Taranta (2004)	The Stewart Copeland Anthology (2007)	Gizmodrome (2017)

The Stewart Copeland Anthology is a compilation album by Stewart Copeland, released in 2007. It is the third anthological album about the solo work of a member of The Police after Sting's Fields of Gold: The Best of Sting 1984–1994 (1994) and Andy Summers' The X Tracks (2004).

== Critical reception ==
Professional ratings
Review scores
Source	Rating
Allmusic	(favourable)

Allmusic in praise of the album wrote, Ranging across Copeland's various projects, (this) gives a comprehensive and compelling look into the musical sensibility of this much-heralded percussionist...Copeland's skill with melody and arrangement are striking, but it's his yen for exotic rhythms, and his unparalleled skill on the skins, that makes this set a winner."

== Contents ==
The Stewart Copeland Anthology is a fairly comprehensive overview of Copeland's solo work. It features mostly film music as well as three singles Copeland has released over the course of his career ("Too Kool to Kalypso" from his studio albums Klark Kent: Music Madness from the Kinetic Kid; "Don't Box Me In" from Rumble Fish; and "Koteya" from The Rythmathist). A live version of "The Equalizer", originally released as a single form the album The Equalizer & Other Cliff Hangers is also included. The album features two previously unreleased songs, "Look Up" (with vocals by Martina Topley-Bird) and "Slither".

== Track listing ==
No.	Title	Original release	Length
1.	"Too Kool to Kalypso" (released under the name "Klark Kent")	Klark Kent	2:29
2.	"Don't Box Me In" (with Stan Ridgway)	Rumble Fish	4:38
3.	"Tulsa Tango"	Rumble Fish	3:40
4.	"Koteja" (with Ray Lema)	The Rhythmatist	3:32
5.	"Serengeti Long Walk"	The Rythmatist	4:28
6.	"Equalizer Main Title" (with The Orchestra Ueca)	Orchestralli	4:13
7.	"Anacott Steel"	Wall Street	2:55
8.	"Slither"	Previously unreleased	3:06
9.	"Night Drive"	Very Bad Things	1:21
10.	"Taxi Ride Home"	West Beirut	1:08
11.	"Bill is Dead"	The Pallbearer	4:03
12.	"Wield the Spade" (as Oysterhead)	The Grand Pecking Order	5:49
13.	"Look Up" (with Martina Topley-Bird)	Previously unreleased	3:04
14.	"Rain (Jacques)"	Spyro the Dragon	4:01
15.	"Childhood Friends"	The Leopard Son	1:42
16.	"Mud Lions"	The Leopard Son	2:11
17.	"Pizzica degli Ucci" (with Vittorio Cosma)	La Notte della Taranta	5:34
18.	"Chrystal/Drive Daisy/End Title"	Dead Like Me	2:31
19.	"George Trip/End Montage/End Title"	Dead Like Me	1:57
20.	"Big Drum Tribe" (with Cosma, Sabal-Lecco, Phil X, Refosco, NKishi)	Previously unreleased	3:55
21.	"Regret" (Stewart Copeland)	Metropolis	1:04
Total length:			67:16

== Personnel ==
- Stewart Copeland – vocals, drums, guitar, bass, keyboards, percussion
- Stan Ridgway - vocals and harmonica on "Don't Box Me In"
- Ray Lema – vocals on "Koteja"
- Michael Andreas – piano on "Slither"
- Michael Thompson – guitar on "Night Drive"
- Judd Miller – woodwinds on "Taxi Drive Home"/"Bill is Dead" and "George Trip"/"End Montage"
- Les Claypool - bass and vocals on "Wield the Spades"
- Trey Anastasio - guitar on "Wield the Spades"
- Martina Topley-Bird - vocals on "Look Up"
- Stanley Clarke - bass on "Childhood Friends"
- Charlie Bisharat - violin on "George Trip"/"End Montage"
- Vittorio Cosma - keyboards on "Pizzica degli Ucci" and "Big Drum Tribe"
- Mauro Refosco - percussions on "Big Drum Tribe"
- David Fiuczynski - guitar on "Big Drum Tribe"
- Armand Sabal-Lecco - bass on "Big Drum Tribe"
- The Orchestra Ueca on "Equalizer"
- Notte della Taranta Ensemble on "Pizzica degli Ucci"
- Recorded, mixed, and engineered by Jeff Seitz
- Mastering engineer: Howie Weinberg
- Album art and design: Eugenio Brambilla
- Vocal recording engineer on "Look Up": Alex McGowan at Space Eko East
