= Luluabourg =

Luluabourg or Lualuaburg was a Belgian colonial place name, derived from the Luluwa river, which may refer to:

- Luluabourg (city), now known as Kananga
- Luluabourg Province
