= List of renamed places in the Democratic Republic of the Congo =

Places renamed after independence

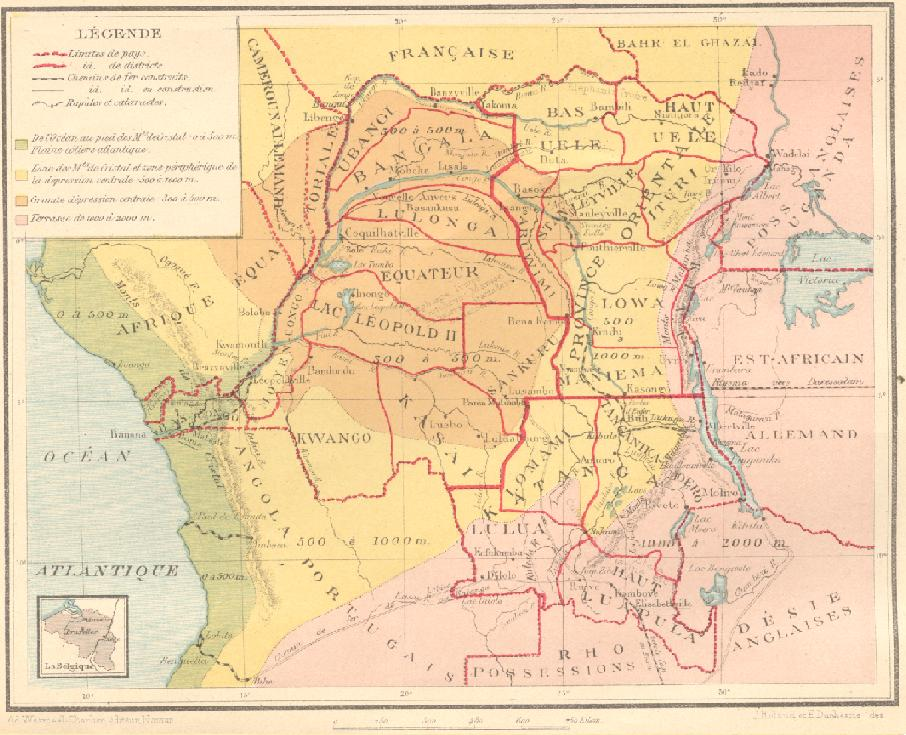
Map of the Belgian Congo, 1914

This is a list of place names of towns and cities in the Democratic Republic of the Congo which were subsequently changed after the end of Belgian colonial rule. Place names of the colonial era tended to have two versions, one in French and one in Dutch, reflecting the two main languages of Belgium. Many of these place names were chosen after local geography or eponymous colonial figures.

Many of the place name changes occurred under the authenticité programme in the 1960s and 1970s during the dictatorship of Mobutu Sese Seko. In some cases, the names had genuine pre-colonial usage or had already been used unofficially during the colonial period. Mobutu also changed the country's name from Congo to Zaire. Today, European speakers of both French and Dutch use the modern Congolese place names.

== Towns and cities ==
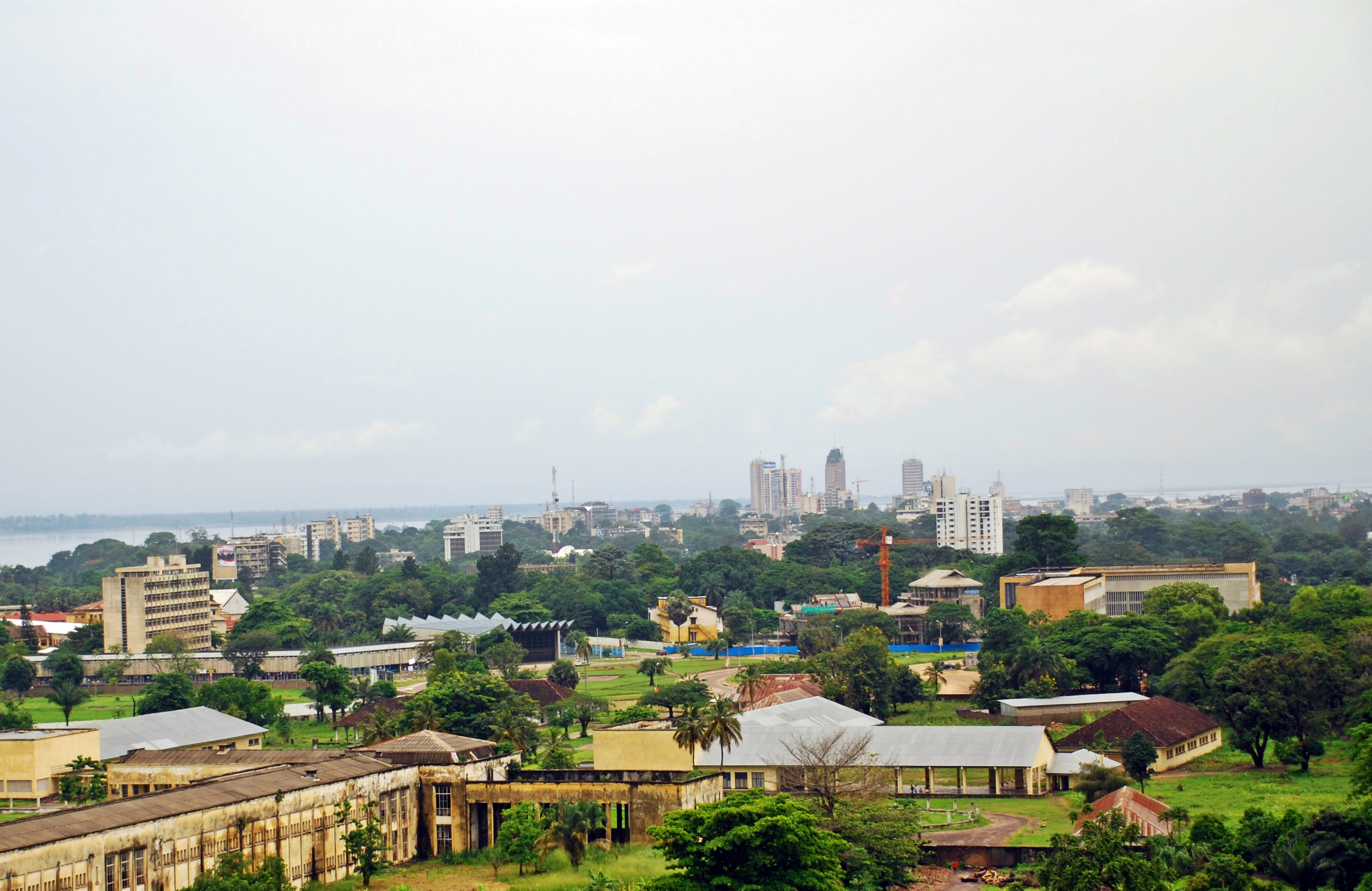
Kinshasa, formerly known as Léopoldville or Leopoldstad

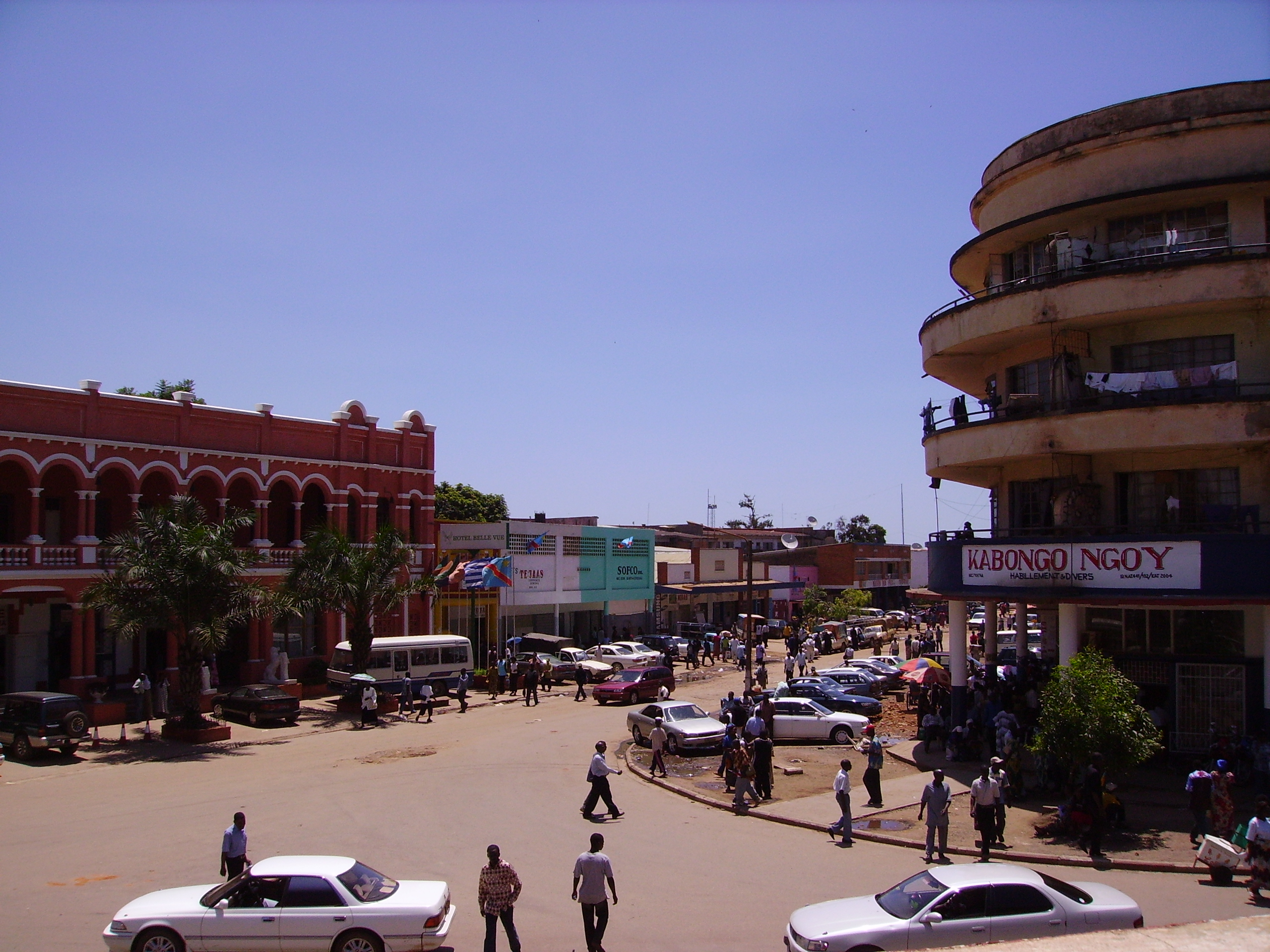
Lubumbashi, formerly known as Élisabethville or Elisabethstad

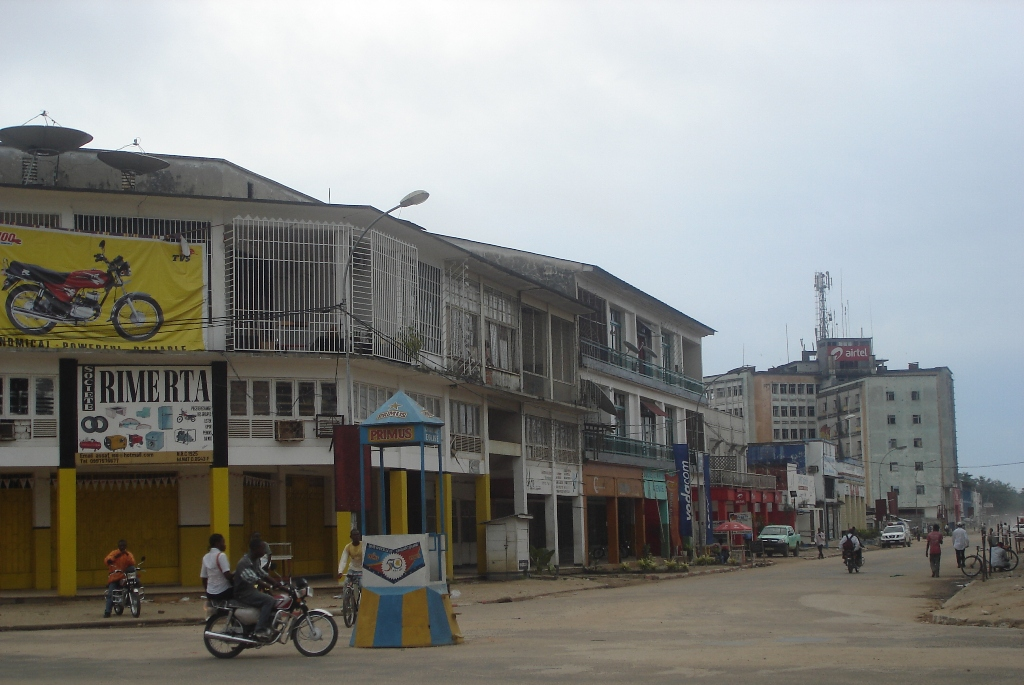
Kisangani, formerly known as Stanleyville or Stanleystad

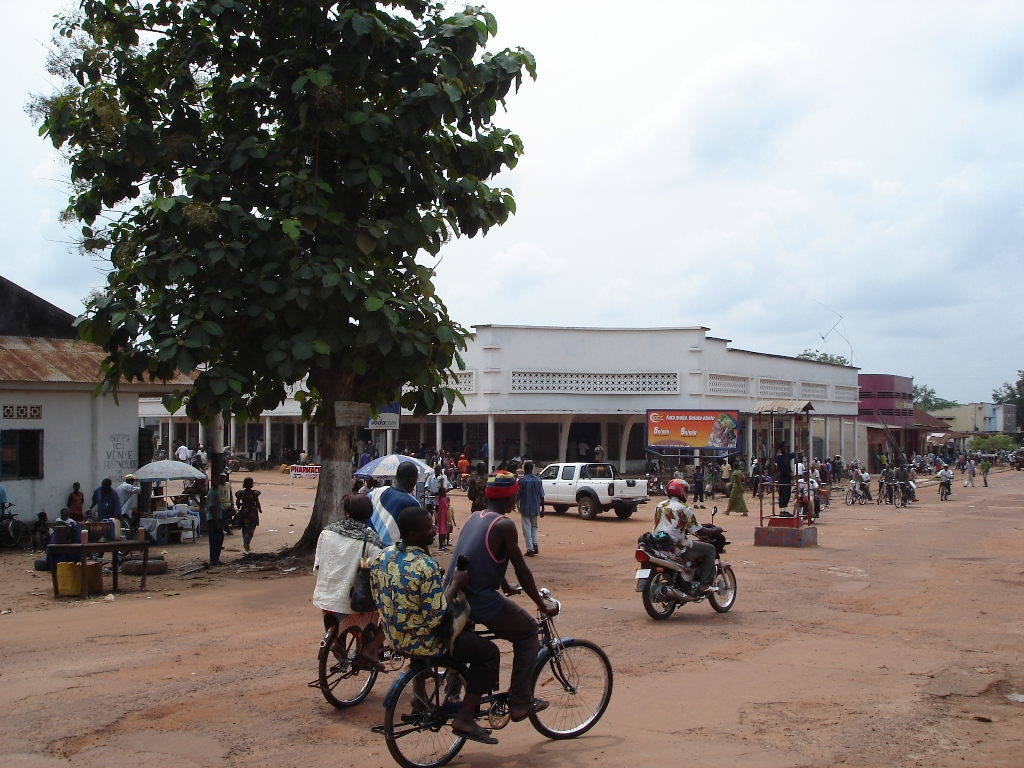
Mbandaka, formerly Coquilhatville or Cocquilhatstad

Current name	Former name in French	Former name in Dutch	Former namesake
Aketi	Aketi Port-Chaltin	Aketi-Chaltinhaven	Named in honour of Louis-Napoléon Chaltin, a colonial military officer of the Congo Free State
Andoma	Liénartville	Lienartstad	Named in honour of Charles-Victor Liénart, explorer and colonial military officer
Banalia	Sainte Élisabeth	Sint Elisabeth	Named after Elizabeth, mother of John the Baptist
Bandundu	Banningville	Banningstad	Named in honour of Émile Banning, influential Belgian civil servant and confidant of Leopold II
Bariki	Joseph		
Boteka	Flandria		Flanders, a region in Belgium
Bukavu	Costermansville	Costermansstad	Named in honour of Paul Costermans, colonial administrator in the Free State, in 1927
Bunkonde	Hemptinne-Saint-Benoît		Named in honour of Jean-Félix Hemptinne, a Belgian monk and the Order of Saint Benedict
Djokupunda	Charlesville	Charlesstad	
Ebabaka	Tursz		
Ebonda	Alberta		Named in honour of King Albert I
Epulu	Camp Putnam (Note: Renamed before the independence)		Named after Patrick Tracy Lowell Putnam, American anthropologist
Gombe (Kinshasa)	Kalina		Named in honour of E. Kalina, an Austrian soldier who died in 1883
Ilebo	Port-Francqui	Francquihaven	Named in honour of Émile Francqui, businessman and philanthropist
Isiro	Paulis		Named in honour of Albert Paulis
Kalemie	Albertville	Albertstad	Named in honour of King Albert I
Kananga	Luluabourg	Luluaburg	Named after the nearby Lulua river
Kanzenze	Liège Sacré-Cœur		Named after the Belgian city Liège and the Sacred Heart
Kasa-Vubu (Kinshasa)	Dendale		
Kasese	Ferme Cobelkat		
Kasongo	Saint-Charles		
Katana	Liège Saint-Lambert		Named after the Belgian city Liège and St Lambert of Maastricht
Katofio	Auberge		
Katubu	Salèssiene		Named after the Salesian Order
Kikwit	Poto-Poto (Note: From 1937. Before that, the city was known as Makaku or Makal.)		
Kindamba	Bailleux		Named in honour of Hector Bailleux, Belgian businessman
Kindu	Kindu Port-Émpain	Kindu Empain-Haven	Named in honour of Edouard Empain, Belgian industrialist
Kinshasa	Léopoldville	Leopoldstad	Named in honour of King Leopold II, King-Sovereign of the Congo Free State
Kirungu	Baudouinville	Boudewijnstad	Named in honour of Prince Baudouin, nephew (and intended successor) of Leopold II
Kisala-Mbati	Salamadie		
Kisangani	Stanleyville	Stanleystad	Named in honour of Henry Morton Stanley, explorer
Kwilu Ngongo	Moerbeke		Named after the Belgian hometown of Maurice Lippens, a major investor in the local sugar industry
Likasi	Jadotville	Jadotstad	Named in honour of Jean Jadot, businessman and industrialist
Lingwala (Kinshasa)	Saint-Jean		Named after St John the Apostle
Lubao	Sentery		
Lubumbashi	Élisabethville	Elisabethstad	Named in honour of Queen Elisabeth
Lufu-Toto	Cattier		Named in honour of Félicien Cattier, businessman
Luila	Wolter		
Lukutola Kivumo	Ferme Servranckx		
Lusaka	Lusaka Saint-Jacques		Named after St. James the Great
Lokandu	Riba-Riba		
Lokutu	Elisabetha		Named in honour of Queen Elisabeth
Lusanga	Leverville	Leverstad	Named after William Lever, British businessman and co-founder of Lever Brothers which owned a local subsidiary, Huileries du Congo Belge (HCB), which produced palm kernels
Makanza	Nouvelle-Anvers	Nieuw Antwerpen	Named after the Belgian port city of Antwerp
Makiso	Stanley		Named in honour of Henry Morton Stanley, explorer and namesake of Stanleyville
Manzonzi	Cipelo		
Mapangu	Brabanta		Named after Brabant in Belgium
Matonge (Kinshasa)	Renkin		Named in honour of Jules Renkin, Belgian politician, Colonial Minister (1908–18) and later Prime Minister (1931–32)
Mbandaka	Coquilhatville (Note: Previously known as "Équateurville")	Cocquilhatstad	Named in honour of Camille Coquilhat, colonial administrator and town's founder
Mbanza-Ngungu	Thysville	Thysstad	Named in honour of Albert Thys, Belgian colonist and businessman
Mobayi-Mbongo	Banzyville	Banzystad	
Mbuji-Mayi	Bakwanga		
Mombelaya	Saint-Trudon		Named after St. Trudo
Muluila	Greinerville	Greinerstad	
Mweke	Dethieu		
Ngaliema (Kinshasa)	Stanley		Named in honour of Henry Morton Stanley, explorer
Nkaw	Saint-Camille		Named after St. Camillus de Lellis
Nsiamfumu	Vista		
Nzoro	Vankerckhovenville	Vankerckhovenstad	Named in honour of Belgian explorer Willem Frans Van Kerckhoven
Sola	Bruges Saint-Donat		Named after the Belgian city Bruges and St. Donatus of Muenstereifel
Tongelo	Tongerlo-Saint-Norbert		Named after the Belgian town Tongerlo and St Norbert of Xanten
Tshilundu	Mérode-Salvador		Named after the House of Mérode
Ubundu	Ponthierville	Ponthierstad	Named in honour of Pierre Ponthier, colonial soldier

== Landmarks and geographic terms ==
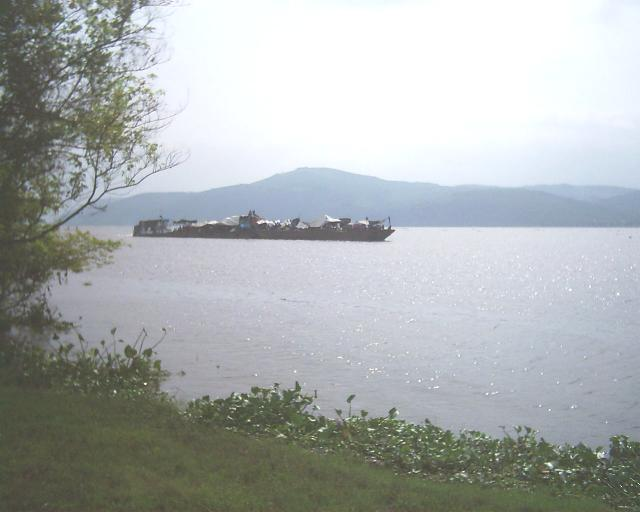
Pool Malebo, formerly Stanley Pool

Current name	Former name in French	Former name in Dutch	Former namesake
Boyoma Falls	Stanley Falls	Stanleywatervallen	Named in honour of Henry Morton Stanley, explorer
Lake Mai-Ndombe	Lac Léopold II	Leopold II Meer	Named in honour of King Leopold II, King-Sovereign of the Congo Free State
Pool Malebo	Stanley Pool		Named in honour of Henry Morton Stanley, explorer
Mayombe	Crystal		
Virunga National Park	Parc Albert	Albert Park	Named in honour of King Albert I

== See also ==
- Authenticité (Zaire)
- Belgian colonial empire
- Mount Stanley
