= Gizmodrome (album) =

Studio album by Gizmodrome
- Released: September 15, 2017
- Recorded: Summer 2016 – Spring 2017
- Studio: Officine Meccaniche, Milan
- Genre: Art rock, pop
- Length: 46:26
- Label: earMUSIC
- Producer: Claudio Dentes, Stewart Copeland

Gizmodrome chronology
Gizmodrome (2017)	Gizmodrome Live (2021)

Gizmodrome is the self-titled debut album by supergroup Gizmodrome, released in September 2017 on earMusic Records. The album peaked at No. 14 on the UK Independent Albums chart.

== Overview ==
As a band, Gizmodrome features members, Stewart Copeland (the Police, Curved Air), Vittorio Cosma (PFM, Elio e le Storie Tese), Mark King (Level 42), and Adrian Belew (Frank Zappa, David Bowie, King Crimson).

One song, "Amaka Pipa", was previewed on earMUSIC's official channel on 12 June 2017, three months before the release of the album. A videoclip of another song, "Man in the Mountain", featuring the band recording in the studio, was also uploaded to the same channel three days before the release of the album.

== Songs ==
"Stay Ready" and "Strange Things Happen", in much different arrangements, were originally released on Stewart Copeland's alter ego Klark Kent's "Kollected Works", with the latter also appearing on the soundtrack of The Texas Chain Massacre 2. "Zombies in the Mall" derives from a tune Copeland wrote for the soundtrack of Spyro the Dragon called "Louis". A song called "Stark Naked" was performed by Curved Air in 1975, during the time Copeland was part of the band, and released in 1995 on Live at the BBC but it bears little to no resemblance to the tune of the same name included in this album. Elio, the frontman of the Italian band Elio e le Storie Tese, in which Cosma is currently a touring member, guest stars as a lead vocalist and lyricist on "Zubatta Cheve".

== Critical reception ==
Professional ratings
Review scores
Source	Rating
Classic Rock	3.5/5 stars

Chris Roberts of Classic Rock claimed, "Supergroups aren’t supposed to sound this fresh. Stewart Copeland (ex-Police), Mark King (Level 42) and Adrian Belew (ex-almost everybody – King Crimson, Bowie, Talking Heads) join with Italian keyboard whizz Vittorio Cosma (ex-PFM) in a Milan studio and have a whale of a time...They occasionally skid off, but most of this album is playful, pugnacious and pleasingly unglued."

== Track listing ==
All music and lyrics written by Stewart Copeland except where noted.

No.	Title	Lyrics	Music	Length
1.	"Zombies in the Mall"			3:59
2.	"Stay Ready"			4:01
3.	"Man in the Mountain"	Copeland, Mark King	Copeland, Vittorio Cosma	3:43
4.	"Summer's Coming"		Cosma	3:30
5.	"Sweet Angels (Rule the World)"	Pat MacDonald, Copeland		2:56
6.	"Amaka Pipa"		Copeland, Adrian Belew	3:39
7.	"Strange Things Happen"			2:55
8.	"Ride Your Life"		King	3:43
9.	"Zubatta Cheve"	Copeland, Elio	Copeland, Cosma	4:01
10.	"Spin This"		King	6:09
11.	"I Know Too Much"		Cosma	3:47
12.	"Stark Naked" (instrumental)			4:07

== Personnel ==
Gizmodrome

- Vittorio Cosma – keyboards, backing vocals
- Adrian Belew – guitar, backing vocals
- Mark King – bass, backing vocals
- Stewart Copeland – drums, percussion, lead and backing vocals

Guest appearance

- Elio – vocals on "Zubatta Cheve"
