= Oysterhead =

American rock supergroup

- Genres: Alternative rock, neo-psychedelia
- Years active: 2000–2001, 2006, 2019–2022
- Spinoff of: Phish; The Police; Primus
- Members: Stewart Copeland; Les Claypool; Trey Anastasio
- Website: www.oysterhead.com

Oysterhead is an American rock supergroup featuring bassist Les Claypool of Primus, guitarist Trey Anastasio of Phish and drummer Stewart Copeland of The Police, with both Claypool and Anastasio providing vocals. The band's eclectic sound has been described as "alt-funk fusion".

In April 2000 Superfly Presents asked Claypool to assemble a band to perform during New Orleans Jazz Fest. Claypool contacted Anastasio and together they agreed on a mutual hero, Copeland. Oysterhead was originally intended to be a singular live performance at New Orleans Saenger Theatre on May 4, 2000. The band compiled a set of almost entirely original material for the show, practicing at Muskegon's Frauenthal Theatre. Tickets were scalped for up to $2,000 each; audience members included Francis Ford Coppola and Matt Groening. The band toured in 2001 and was scheduled to tour in 2020. Both times it has toured it has been interrupted due to significant disasters, in 2001 due to the September 11 attacks and in 2020 due to the COVID-19 pandemic. Oysterhead played at The Peach Music Festival in Scranton, PA in July 2021.

== The Grand Pecking Order ==
In 2001, Oysterhead reformed to record and release an album entitled The Grand Pecking Order, which featured nine new tracks in addition to four songs originally debuted in New Orleans. The album was released on October 2, 2001, and was supported by a North American tour, spanning from October 21 to November 18, 2001, accompanied by North Mississippi Allstars, Drums & Tuba, The Cancer Conspiracy, Lake Trout, Mark Ribot y Los Cubanos Postizos and New Orleans Klezmer Allstars. Two pre-tour warm-up shows had been booked at Toad's Place in New Haven, Connecticut for September 14, 2001 and the Irving Plaza in New York City, New York (as part of CMJ Music Marathon) for September 15, 2001, but were cancelled in the wake of the September 11 attacks. Oysterhead's 2001 tour saw the debut of the Matterhorn, a guitar played by Trey Anastasio featuring a full-size deer antler. On November 15, 2001, the band performed the song "Oz Is Ever Floating" on Late Night with Conan O'Brien.

== Reformation at Bonnaroo ==
On June 16, 2006, Oysterhead reunited to perform a two-hour set at the Bonnaroo Music Festival. The band performed music from The Grand Pecking Order during the set.

== Reformation in 2019 ==
In October 2019, Oysterhead created social media accounts on Instagram and Twitter and announced they would play two reunion shows in February 2020 at 1stBank Center in Broomfield, Colorado.

While the band went on to schedule additional 2020 tour dates in California and at several US festivals, only the two Colorado dates were performed before the other dates were disrupted by the COVID-19 pandemic. Oysterhead resumed touring in 2021.

When asked in March 2022 if the band planned to record a second album, Claypool said it was unclear: "We always talk about it when we're sitting around, but all three of us are so busy. We haven't really found the time to do it. It's an undertaking. You've got three guys that are all alpha dogs in the same room. It's more of an undertaking I think, but who knows. I've been talking to Stewart lately about trying to get together and just start jamming on some shit and see what happens."

== List of performances ==
Location	Venue	Date
2000
(Louisiana) New Orleans, LA	Saenger Theater	05/04/2000
2001
(Connecticut) New Haven, CT	Toad's Place	09/13/2001
(New York (state)) New York, NY	Irving Plaza	09/15/2001
(Vermont) Westford, VT	The Barn	09/15/2001
(Washington (state)) Seattle, WA	The Paramount	10/21/2001
(British Columbia) Vancouver, BC	Orpheum Theatre	10/23/2001
(Oregon) Salem, OR	Salem Armory	10/24/2001
(California) Berkeley, CA	Greek Theatre	10/26/2001
(California) Los Angeles, CA	Hollywood Palladium	10/27/2001
(Colorado) Denver, CO	The Fillmore	10/30/2001
(Colorado) Denver, CO	The Fillmore	10/31/2001
(Illinois) Chicago, IL	Aragon Ballroom	11/02/2001
(Indiana) West Lafayette, IN	Elliot Hall of Music	11/03/2001
(Michigan) Ann Arbor, MI	Hill Auditorium	11/04/2001
(Ohio) Cleveland, OH	Cleveland State Theatre	11/06/2001
(Ontario) Toronto, ON	Massey Hall	11/07/2001
(New York (state)) Utica, NY	Utica Memorial Auditorium	11/09/2001
(Massachusetts) Lowell, MA	Tsongas Arena	11/10/2001
(New Jersey) Camden, NJ	Tweeter Center	11/11/2001
(New York (state)) New York, NY	Roseland Ballroom	11/13/2001
(New York (state)) New York, NY	Roseland Ballroom	11/14/2001
(New York (state)) New York, NY	Studio 6A, NBC Studios	11/15/2001
(Washington, D.C.) Washington, DC	DAR Constitution Hall	11/16/2001
(North Carolina) Asheville, NC	Asheville Civic Center	11/17/2001
(Florida) Gainesville, FL	O'Connell Center	11/18/2001
2006
(Tennessee) Manchester, TN	Bonnaroo Music Festival	06/16/2006
2020
(Colorado) Broomfield, CO	1stBank Center	02/14/2020
(Colorado) Broomfield, CO	1stBank Center	02/15/2020
(California) Berkeley, CA	Greek Theatre	04/17/2020
(California) Stanford, CA	Frost Amphitheater	04/18/2020
(Illinois) Chicago, IL	Aragon Ballroom	04/22/2020
(Illinois) Chicago, IL	Aragon Ballroom	04/23/2020
(Georgia (U.S. state)) Atlanta, GA	Centennial Olympic Park	04/24/2020
(Georgia (U.S. state)) Atlanta, GA	Centennial Olympic Park	04/25/2020
(Georgia (U.S. state)) Atlanta, GA	Centennial Olympic Park	04/26/2020
(Tennessee) Manchester, TN	Bonnaroo Music Festival	06/13/2020
(Pennsylvania) Scranton, PA	Scranton Peach Festival	07/04/2020
(Tennessee) Manchester, TN	Bonnaroo Music Festival (1st reschedule)	09/26/2020
2021
(California) Berkeley, CA	Greek Theatre	04/17/2021
(Tennessee) Manchester, TN	Bonnaroo Music Festival (2nd reschedule)	06/18/2021
(Pennsylvania) Scranton, PA	Scranton Peach Festival	07/03/2021
2022
(Georgia (U.S. state)) Atlanta, GA	Centennial Olympic Park	05/01/2022
Key
Canceled due to September 11 Attacks
Canceled due to COVID-19 pandemic
Postponed due to COVID-19 pandemic
Make-up show
Television only
Private performance

== Discography ==
- The Grand Pecking Order (2001)
- 2020/02/14 Broomfield, CO (2020) (Live album)
- 2020/02/15 Broomfield, CO (2020) (Live album)
