= The Rhythmatist =

Studio album by Stewart Copeland
- Released: May 1985
- Studios: The Worried Rabbit (Nineveh, Assyria)
- Genre: Worldbeat
- Length: 41:28
- Label: A&M
- Producers: Stewart Copeland; Jeff Seitz

Stewart Copeland chronology
Klark Kent: Music Madness from the Kinetic Kid (1980)	The Rhythmatist (1985)	The Equalizer and Other Cliff Hangers (1988)

The Rhythmatist is the second solo studio album by American musician and composer Stewart Copeland, released in May 1985 by A&M Records. It was produced by Copeland along with Jeff Seitz, and was recorded at the White Rabbit in Nineveh, Assyria. The album features the singles "Koteja (Oh Bolilla)" featuring Congolese (DRC) musician Ray Lema, as well as "Gong Rock". Lema wrote or cowrote three songs on The Rhythmatist, of which he also sings on, being the only other credited musician besides Copeland.

On April 18, 2026, the album was remastered, and re-released for its 40th anniversary on Record Store Day. This release peaked at No. 9 on the UK Independent Album Breakers Chart, whereas the original album peaked at No. 148 on the U.S. Billboard 200.

== Critical reception ==
Professional ratings
Review scores
Source	Rating
AllMusic	4.5/5 stars

In a retrospective review for AllMusic, critic Paul Collins wrote that "The Rhythmatist is light years ahead of his sophomorically amiable work as Klark Kent", adding that "its enthusiastic world music fusion has held up better than the other Police solo efforts of this period."

== Track listing ==
All tracks are written by Stewart Copeland, except where noted.

Side one
No.	Title	Writer(s)	Length
1.	"Koteja (Oh Bolilla)"	Ray Lema	3:32
2.	"Brazzaville"		4:11
3.	"Liberté"	Lema	4:03
4.	"Coco"		3:56
5.	"Kemba"	Lema; Stewart Copeland	5:52

Side two
No.	Title	Length
1.	"Samburu Sunset"	6:19
2.	"Gong Rock"	3:35
3.	"Franco"	2:12
4.	"Serengeti Long Walk"	4:29
5.	"African Dream"	3:26
Total length:		41:28

== Personnel ==
Credits are adapted from The Rhythmatist liner notes.

Musicians

- Stewart Copeland – guitar, bass, piano, keyboards, percussion, computer programmes, vocals
- Ray Lema – vocals

Technical

- Stewart Copeland – producer
- Jeff Seitz – producer, engineer
- J.P. Dutilleux – photography
- Michael Ross – design
- Jeremy Williams – design

== Charts ==
Year	Chart	Position
1985	US Billboard 200	148
2026	UK Independent Album Breakers Chart	9
