= Ray Lema =

Congolese musician (born 1946)

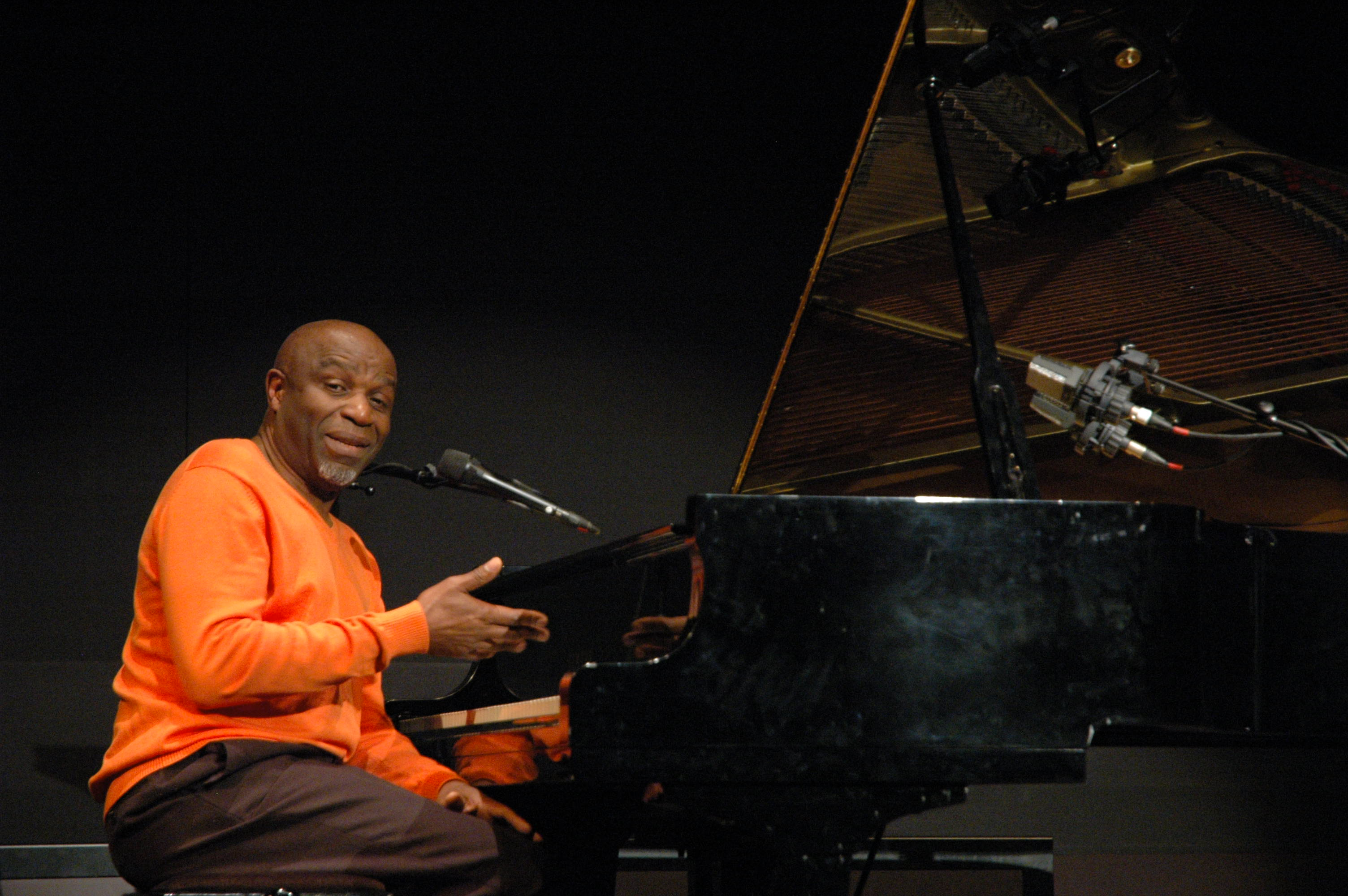
- Lema at the Cinémathèque française in Paris, France, 2008

Background information
- Born: Raymond Lema A'nsi Nzinga; 30 March 1946 (age 80); Cattier, Belgian Congo (modern-day Lufu-Toto, DR Congo)
- Education: University of Kinshasa
- Genres: World music
- Occupations: Musician; songwriter
- Instruments: Piano; guitar
- Label: Island
- Website: raylema.com

Raymond Lema A'nsi Nzinga (born 30 March 1946), known as Ray Lema, is a Congolese (DRC) musician. A pianist, guitarist, and songwriter, he settled in France in 1982.

== Biography ==
Lema was born in Lufu-Toto, Bas-Congo Province. As a child, he wanted to be a Catholic priest and in 1957, at the age of 11, he entered a seminary with the White Fathers, where his talent for music was recognized. He began learning the organ and piano, within a European classical canon that included Gregorian chants, Mozart and Chopin; his concert debut was Beethoven's Moonlight Sonata.

Lema left the seminary in 1962 and subsequently attended the University of Kinshasa, where he studied chemistry. He became interested in popular music from outside Africa and after learning to play guitar he began his involvement with the Kinshasa music scene. He became a performer in clubs and was a fan of musicians such as Jimi Hendrix and Eric Clapton.

In the early 1970s, Lema went round the country recording as an ethnomusicologist. In 1974, he became music director for two years of the National Ballet of Zaire. Over the years, he has played with the bands of Tabu Ley Rochereau, Joseph Kabasele and Franco, and in 1978 his own band, Ya Tupas, won the French Maracas d'Or award.

In 1979, he was invited by the Rockefeller Foundation to the United States, where he recorded his first album, Koteja (1982). He then moved to Europe, settling in 1982 in France. His album Kinshasa-Washington DC-Paris was released in 1983. His mostly electronic album Medecine was recorded in London with producer Martin Meissonnier and featured Tony Allen on the song "Peupleyo". Lema's first recordings in the early 1980s were for Celluloid Records, and by 1989 he had international success signing with the Island Records subsidiary, Mango.

Lema has become a major figure in world music, performing at numerous music festivals, and has also worked as a film composer. He has also been involved with various international collaborations. He appears as a vocalist (and composer on three tracks) on Stewart Copeland's 1985 album, The Rhythmatist. Guests on Lema's 1989 album Nangadeef include Courtney Pine and the Mahotella Queens. In 1992, Lema spent time in Abidjan, Côte d'Ivoire, writing the opera Un Touareg s’est marié avec une pygmée with Cameroonian Werewere Liking, and also that year worked with German pianist Joachim Kuhn to record Euro African Suites. In 1997, Lema recorded the album Bulgarian Voices with the choir of the Pirin Folk Ensemble, and composed The Dream of the Gazelle for a Swedish chamber orchestra. In 2000, he worked with Moroccan band Tyour Gnaoua and brought out the CD Saf.

In 2002, Lema appeared on a track titled "No Agreement" on the Red Hot Organization's tribute album to Fela Kuti, Red Hot and Riot, alongside Res, Tony Allen, Baaba Maal, Positive Black Soul and Archie Shepp.

He was awarded the "Django d'Or" in October 2003, and in 2013 the Charles Cros Grand Prix de la Musique.

== Selected discography ==
- 1983: Kinshasa, Washington D.C. Paris
- 1985: Medecine
- 1989: Nangadeef
- 1990: Gaia
- 1995: Tout Partout
- 1996: Green Light
- 1997: Stoptime
- 1998: The Dream Of The Gazelle
- 2004: Mizila
- 2012: V.S.N.P.
- 2016: Headbug
- 2016: Riddles: duet with Laurent de Wilde
- 2021: Riddles: duet with Laurent de Wilde
