= Everyone Stares =

2006 film by Stewart Copeland

- DVD cover
- Directed by: Stewart Copeland
- Produced by: Miles Copeland III
- Starring: Stewart Copeland; Sting; Andy Summers
- Narrated by: Stewart Copeland
- Edited by: Mike Cahill
- Music by: The Police
- Release date: 2006
- Running time: 74 minutes
- Countries: United Kingdom; United States
- Language: English

Everyone Stares: The Police Inside Out is a rockumentary film made by Stewart Copeland, drummer of the band The Police. The film premiered at the 2006 Sundance Film Festival and was released on DVD in September 2006. The title of the film is a reference to his song "Does Everyone Stare", from Reggatta de Blanc. It was re-released in 2019 on DVD and Blu-Ray, with different cover artwork.

For this film, Stewart Copeland used material he shot himself with a Super-8 camera he bought in 1978.

== Plot ==
The first part of the film is a slideshow of photos before Copeland acquired his film camera. This includes the era with Henry Padovani and the arrival of Andy Summers. The film then follows the band as they try to find success in America, joined by Copeland's childhood friend Kim Turner as their tour manager.

The band then return to Europe, performing at various festivals. They then got their first taste of fame when a mob of fans wait for them in Birmingham after a show. This is followed by number one singles on both sides of the Atlantic and the band's explosive shoot to success. However, they collaborate less and less on songs as Sting brings in almost finished songs. It ends with The Police headlining the US Festival in 1982 and their eventual breakup.

== Track list ==
- The First Two Years [3:44]
- I Got This Movie Camera [5:31]
- And It May Sound Strange [3:50]
- Europe Summer Festivals [4:40]
- Next to You at Lorelei [2:27]
- First Frenzy [3:50]
- Chat to Camera During Show [3:51]
- Andy at the Blue Boar [4:33]
- Blonde Life [2:53]
- Newsreels [1:18]
- Zenyatta [8:22]
- Back to America Huge [:59]
- Doo Doo Inna Snow Snow [3:36]
- Getting Disconnected [6:35]
- Montserrat [3:48]
- World Conquest [4:37]
- No Sleep Till Hammersmith [2:45]
- US Festival — From the Front [3:28]
- End Titles [2:42]
