= Vittorio Cosma =

Italian musician (born 1965)

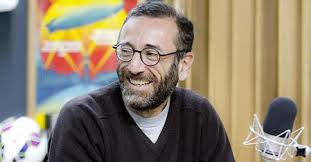
- Cosma in 2011

Background information
- Born: 11 March 1965 (age 61); Varese, Italy
- Genres: Jazz; jazz fusion; rock
- Occupations: Musician; record producer
- Instrument: Piano
- Years active: 1980s–present

Vittorio Cosma (born 11 March 1965) is an Italian pianist, record producer, conductor, and arranger.

== Life and career ==
Born in Varese, Cosma studied piano at the Milan Conservatory and later jazz piano under Patrizio Fariselli and Franco D'Andrea. He made his professional debut as keyboardist in the bands Volpini Volanti and Premiata Forneria Marconi, with whom he made four tours and recorded Miss Baker.

His activities as composer, arranger, and producer began in the late 1980s for Eugenio Finardi's album Il vento di Elora. He also curated several compilation albums of jazz and fusion music, and composed scores for films, TV series, and commercials.

Cosma is a longtime collaborator with the musical group Elio e le Storie Tese. His collaborations also include Pino Daniele, Ornella Vanoni, Renato Zero, Ivano Fossati, Stewart Copeland, Roberto Vecchioni, Ricchi e Poveri, Mike Francis, Enrico Ruggeri, Teresa De Sio, Nino Buonocore, Grazia Di Michele.

In 2017, he formed the supergroup Gizmodrome with Stewart Copeland, Adrian Belew, and Mark King, with whom he recorded a studio album and a live album.
