= Lufu-Toto =

Locality in the Democratic Republic of the Congo

Coordinates: 5°26′00″S 14°45′0″E

Lufu-Toto, formerly known as Cattier after Félicien Cattier, is a locality in the Democratic Republic of the Congo. It is part of the Mbanza-Ngungu territory, in the province of Kongo Central. It is located approximately 260 km (160 mi) from the port of Matadi.

It is a secondary station on the Matadi-Kinshasa railway line, housing the depots of the Office National des Transports (ONATRA).

Soybeans are grown in Lufu-Toto.

The musician Ray Lema was born in Lufu-Toto while his mother was traveling through the town by train.
