= Gizmodrome =

Rock supergroup

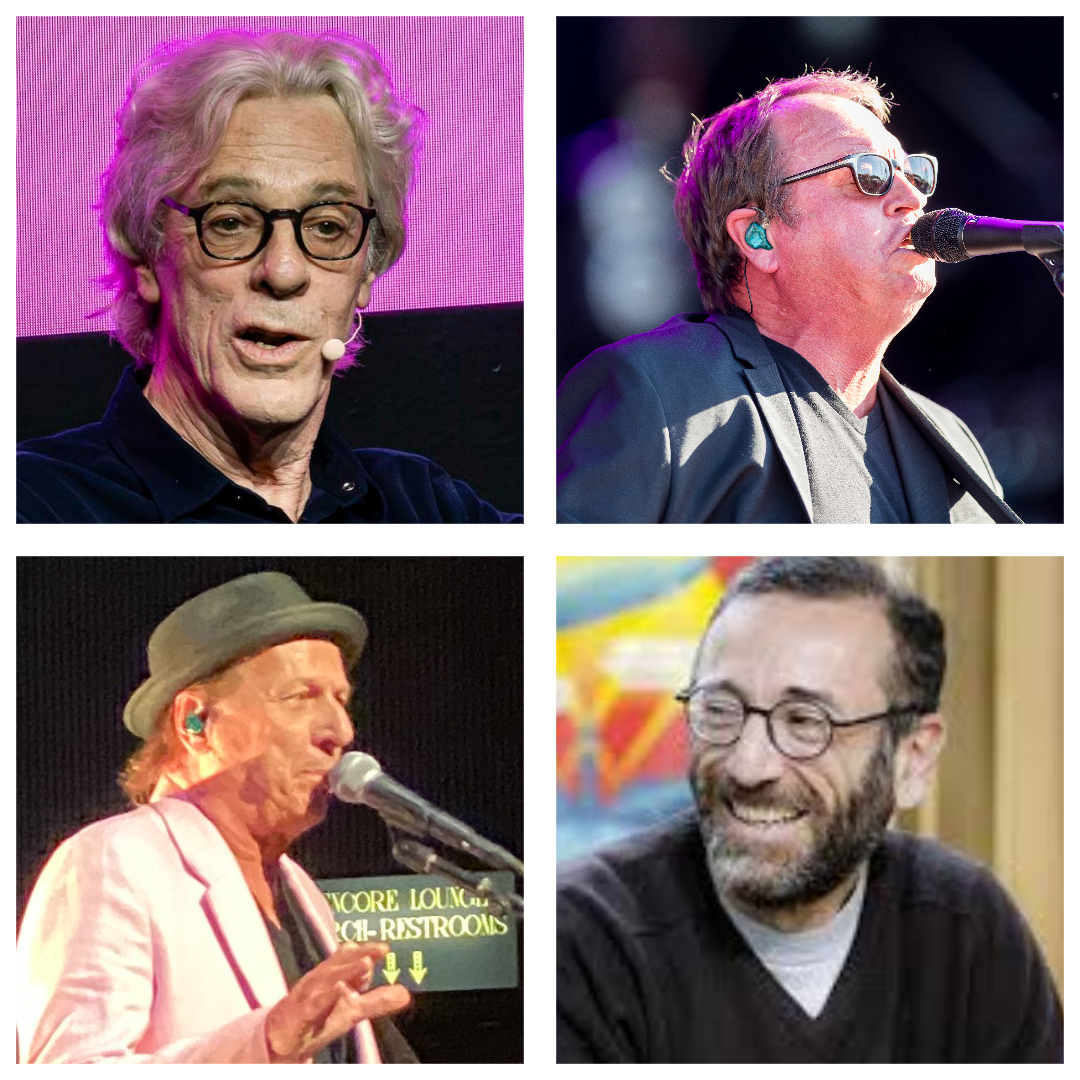
- Lineup of Gizmodrome. Clockwise from top left: Stewart Copeland, Mark King, Vittorio Cosma, Adrian Belew

Background information
- Also known as: Copeland, King, Cosma & Belew
- Origin: Milan, Italy
- Genres: Art rock
- Years active: 2017–present
- Members: Stewart Copeland; Mark King; Vittorio Cosma; Adrian Belew

Gizmodrome (sometimes known as Copeland, King, Cosma & Belew) is a British-Italian-American rock supergroup formed in Milan, Italy in 2017. The four-piece band consists of Police drummer Stewart Copeland, Level 42 bassist Mark King, Italian keyboardist Vittorio Cosma, and guitarist Adrian Belew who played for Frank Zappa, King Crimson, Talking Heads, David Bowie and many others.

== History ==
The group's debut album, Gizmodrome, was released on September 15, 2017. It was recorded in Milan over two weeks in summer 2016 and spring 2017. The album peaked at No. 14 on the UK Independent Albums chart.

== Band members ==
- Stewart Copeland – vocals, drums, guitar (2017–present)
- Mark King – bass, vocals (2017–present)
- Vittorio Cosma – keyboards, vocals (2017–present)
- Adrian Belew – guitar, vocals (2017–present)

== Discography ==
=== Albums ===
- Gizmodrome (2017)
- Gizmodrome Live (2021)

=== EPs ===
- Riff Tricks - The Instrumentals Vol. 1 (2017, limited edition to only 1000 copies)
