= Félicien Cattier =

Belgian banker and financier

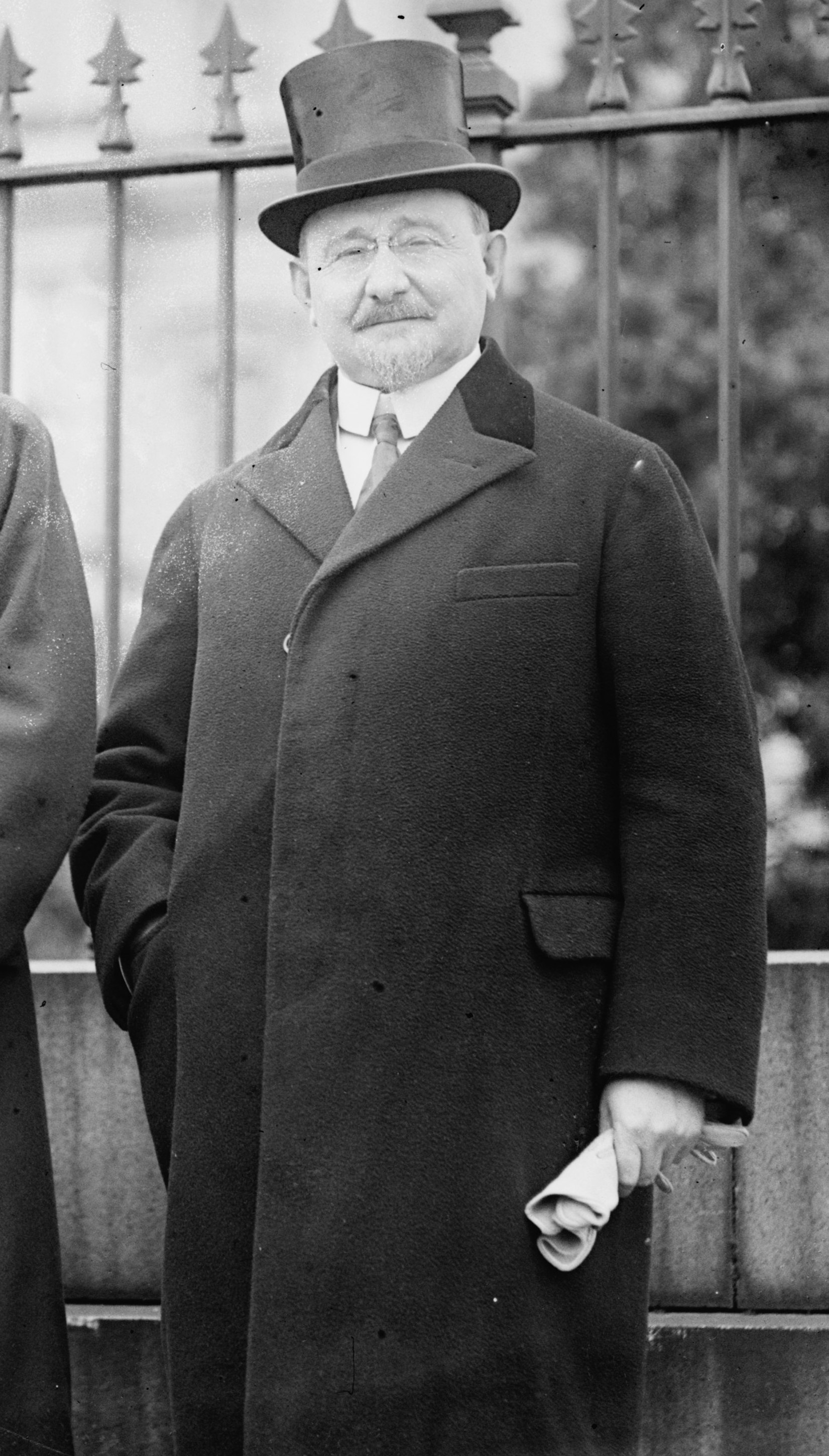
Félicien Cattier (1921)

Félicien Cattier (1869–1946) was a prominent Belgian banker, financier and philanthropist. He was also professor of law at the Free University of Brussels. He was governor of the powerful trust, the Société Générale de Belgique and chairman of the Union minière du-Haut-Katanga amongst many other companies.

== Life ==
Félicien Cattier was born in Cuesmes on 4 March 1869. A member of the Royal Academy of Belgium, Felicien Cattier made a career in finance and banking. He was a close associate of the Belgian King Albert I, Emile Francqui, Adolphe Stoclet, Paul Errera, politician Emile Vandervelde, US President Herbert Hoover and the Prime Minister and Minister of State Henri Jaspar.

== Professor ==
Starting in 1897, he began a career as a professor at the Université libre de Bruxelles (ULB), where he served as Dean of the Faculty of Law from 1909 to 1911, before resigning in 1918, having become absorbed by his other professional activities. However, he remained closely connected to the academic world. He served on the Board of Directors of ULB and maintained deep involvement in the academic and scientific research community throughout his life. Together with Émile Francqui, he was one of the key thinkers behind the creation of the University Foundation and the National Fund for Scientific Research (FNRS). He was also a member of the École de Bruxelles, a school of legal philosophy and jurisprudence, President of the Francqui Foundation, Honorary President of the Belgian American Educational Foundation, and a board member of the Queen Elisabeth Egyptological Foundation .

== Lawyer ==
After completing his law studies, Félicien interned under Edmond Picard, then became legal advisor to the King of Siam, working alongside Gustave Rolin-Jaequemyns at the end of the 19th century. Upon returning to Belgium, Cattier became one of the first to openly oppose King Leopold II's policies in the Congo. In 1897, he condemned the Congolese human zoo displayed during the Brussels World's Fair. In the years that followed, he denounced the Atrocities in the Congo Free State, then the personal property of Leopold II. His 1906 publication, Study on the Situation of the Congo Free State, played a key role in the eventual annexation of the Congo by the Belgian state. He wrote:

“The Congo State is not a colonizing state, barely even a state: it is a financial enterprise (…) The colony was administered neither in the interest of the natives nor even in the economic interest of Belgium: the driving force was to provide the Sovereign King with maximum resources.”

Following the annexation, he helped draft the Colonial Charter of 1908 and became a member of the Colonial Council.

== Financier ==
At the turn of the 20th century, Félicien Cattier turned toward a career in finance and business. He became Secretary of the Compagnie Internationale d’Orient and managing director of the Banque d'Outremer. During World War I, he opposed the arbitrary policies imposed by the Germans in occupied Belgium. He was deported with Henri Pirenne to Germany and placed under house arrest in Hildesheim from November 1915 to November 1918. After the war, he was appointed President of both the Financial Section and the Public Funds Subcommittee of the Committee for the Defense of Belgian Interests in Russia, and became Chairman of the Banque d’Outremer. He also took leadership of the Chinese Engineering and Mining Company and the Chinese Central Railway.

In 1928, following the merger of the Banque d’Outremer with the Société Générale de Belgique, he became Director, and later Vice-Governor in 1935. He oversaw and chaired several major colonial companies of the group, including Union Minière du Haut-Katanga, Forminière, BCK (railway), the Compagnie Maritime Belge, and the Banque du Congo Belge. He was also a leading figure in the Committee for the Protection of Belgian Diamond Trade and Industry based in Antwerp. He was offered the position of Governor of the National Bank of Belgium, but declined. Upon reaching retirement age in 1939, he was named Honorary Vice-Governor of the Société Générale de Belgique. In 1944, after the assassination of Alexandre Galopin, he served interim as Governor of the Société Générale.

== Diplomat ==
Cattier was also very active in international financial circles and used his legal expertise and diplomatic skills to play significant roles in several major global financial initiatives and international conferences of Genes and Washington in 1922. He significantly contributed to the Young Plan, led by American banker Owen D. Young, tasked with revising Germany's reparations payments following World War I. Following the development of the Young Plan, Cattier participated at the international negotiations that took place in The Hague to finalise and implement the Young Plan's terms, which eventually led to the establishment of the Bank for International Settlements.

== Honours ==
He died 4 February 1946 in Funchal, Madeira.

The Congolese community of Lufu-Toto, then in the Belgian Congo, and the ore Cattier cattierite, were named in his honor, and one of the congolese mineral is called Cattierite. A conference room of the University Foundation bears his name.

== Family ==
Jean Cattier, one of Félicien's sons, was a notable investment banker, financial chief of the Marshall Plan for West Germany, and a member of the Council on Foreign Relations, and the prestigious Links Club. Jean Cattier studied at Ecole Polytechnique of Brussels University and, from 1921 to 1925, embark in banking career, working in Vienna, Budapest, Amsterdam and London, before travelling to New York in 1926. He worked in Wall Street and joined White, Weld & Co., a prestigious investment bank, as partner, director and chairman, and he also served as director and then chairman of the Euro-American Banking Corporation which included the Deutsche Bank, the Societe Generale, Midland Bank, Amsterdam-Rotterdam Bank N.V., the Societe Generale de Banque and the Credit Bankverein. During World War 2, he was lieutenant colonel and a member of the OSS, earning military decoration from the American government, the French Croix de Guerre with gold star and the insignia of the grand Officer in the Order of the Crown. In the early 1950s, he was Chief of the Economic Cooperation Administration Special Mission to West Germany and head of the Office of Economic Affairs at the U.S. High Commission for Germany. Cattier was instrumental in overseeing financial operations and economic policy implementation during the early 1950s. In the late 1960s he was ranked as one of the most influential figures of the United States.

One of Felicien's daughters, Marie Louise Cattier, married Marcel Godfrey Isaacs, son of Godfrey Isaacs, managing director of the Marconi's Wireless Telegraphy Company, the man behind the creation of the BBC, and the brother of Rufus Isaacs, 1st Marquess of Reading and Viceroy of India.

Pierre Cattier, his second son, was General Manager of the Compagnie Maritime Belge, and Agence Maritime Belge and, during the Second World War, a member of the management committee of the Forminière, the International Forestry and Mining Company of the Congo.

Sylva Cattier, third son of Félicien, Doctor of Law and graduate of the University of Brussels, was a jurist and commercial law attorney at the Brussels Bar, as well as a specialist in hunting law, and author of the Handbook of Belgian Hunting Law. He married one of the descendant of Lieven Bauwens.

John Cattier one of Felicien's grand son, a Yale graduated, was an investment banker. From 1957 to December 1984, Mr. Cattier was associated with White Weld & Co., investment bankers, serving as a general partner, and with Credit Suisse White Weld (which subsequently became Credit Suisse First Boston). He was also known for being one of a team of Eurobond professionals that made White Weld for a period in the 1960s the leading company in the market. Cattier has also been credited with planting the idea of a system for Eurobond ‘clearances’ and he played a significant role in the development of Euroclear, serving on its initial board and executive committee after its establishment in 1968.

== Works ==
- Evolution du droit pénal germanique en Hainaut jusqu'au XVe siècle (Evolution of the German criminal law in Hainaut until the fifteenth century), 1893
- Premier registre aux plaids de la cour féodale du comté de Hainaut (1333 à 1405) (First register of pleas at the feudal court of the Count of Hainaut, 1333 to 1405), 1893
- Droit et Administration de l'Etat Indépendant du Congo (Law and administration of the Independent State of Congo), 1898
- Étude sur la situation de l'État Indépendant du Congo (Study of the situation of the Independent State of Congo), 1906

== Sources ==
- Gouverner la Société Générale de Belgique, Brussels: De Boeck, 1996.
- Le nouveau dictionnaire des Belges, Brussels: Le Cri, 1992.
- Dictionnaire des Patrons de Belgique, Brussels: De Boeck. 1996.
- New York Times
- fr:Plan Young
- https://www.nytimes.com/1990/02/12/obituaries/jean-cattier-88-dies-led-bank-consortium.html
- https://www.trumanlibrary.gov/library/oral-histories/harkortg
- https://history.state.gov/historicaldocuments/frus1951v03p2/persons
- https://whorulesamerica.ucsc.edu/power/bohemian_grove_appendix.html
- Links Club
- https://onlinelibrary.wiley.com/doi/pdf/10.1002/9781119206293.app3
- https://www.nytimes.com/1973/02/26/archives/end-of-us-capital-curbs-seen-hurting-eurobonds-end-of-the-us.html
