= Stewart Copeland =

American drummer and composer (born 1952)

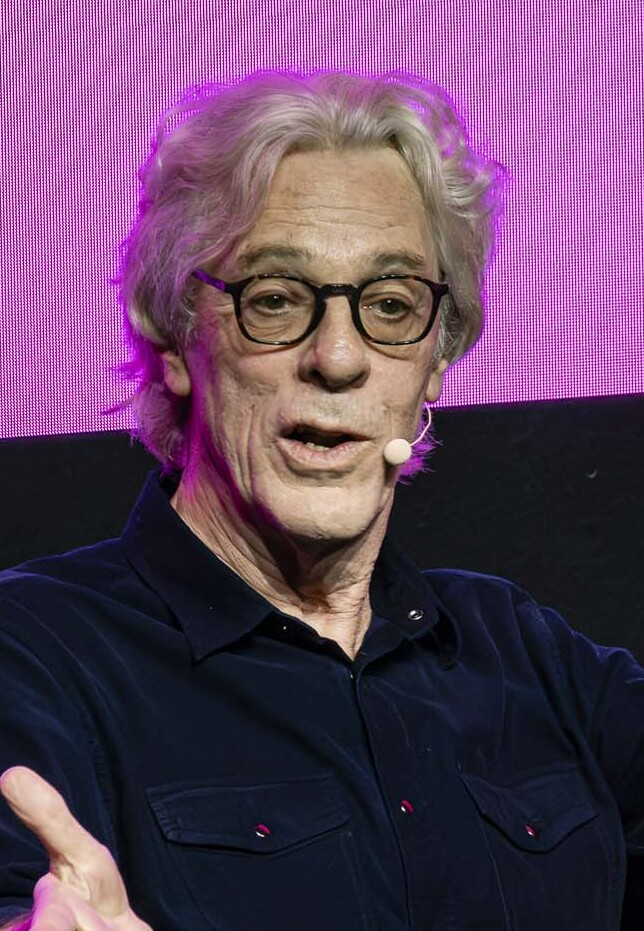
- Copeland in 2025

Background information
- Also known as: Klark Kent
- Born: Stewart Armstrong Copeland; July 16, 1952 (age 74); Alexandria, Virginia, U.S.
- Genres: Rock; pop; new wave; film score; contemporary classical
- Occupations: Musician; composer
- Instruments: Drums; percussion
- Years active: 1974–present
- Member of: Animal Logic; Oysterhead; Gizmodrome
- Formerly of: Curved Air; The Police
- Website: stewartcopeland.net

YouTube information
- Channel: Stewart Copeland
- Genre: Music
- Subscribers: 136 thousand
- Views: 22.7 million
- Last updated: August 13, 2026

Stewart Armstrong Copeland (born July 16, 1952) is an American musician and composer who was the drummer of the English rock band the Police (1977–1984, 1986, 2007–2008). Before the Police, he played drums with the progressive rock band Curved Air (1975–1976).

As a composer, Copeland's work includes the scores of the films Wall Street (1987), Men at Work (1990), Good Burger (1997), and We Are Your Friends (2015); the theme music for television shows The Equalizer, The Amanda Show, and Dead Like Me; and the scores for video games in the Spyro series and Alone in the Dark: The New Nightmare. He has also written pieces for ballet, opera, and orchestra.

According to MusicRadar, Copeland's "distinctive drum sound and uniqueness of style has made him one of the most popular drummers to ever get behind a drumset". He was ranked the 10th-best drummer of all time by Rolling Stone in 2016. He was inducted into the Rock and Roll Hall of Fame as a member of the Police in 2003, the Modern Drummer Hall of Fame in 2005, and the Classic Drummer Hall of Fame in 2013.

== Early life ==
Stewart Armstrong Copeland was born in Alexandria, Virginia, on July 16, 1952, the youngest of four children of British archaeologist Lorraine Copeland (née Adie; 1921–2013) and American espionage officer Miles Copeland Jr. (1916–1991). His mother was born in London, while his father was from Alabama. His father was, according to his own 1989 biography and files released by the CIA in 2008, a key intelligence operative in Britain during the Second World War and a founding member of the Central Intelligence Agency. Stewart's mother was also an espionage veteran, serving in the British Special Operations Executive.

Miles Copeland was assigned CIA duties in the Middle East and the family moved to Cairo a few months after Stewart's birth. When Stewart was five years old the family moved to Beirut, where he attended the American Community School. He started taking drumming lessons at age 12 and was playing drums for school dances within a year. He later moved to England, attending the American School in London and Millfield boarding school in Somerset from 1967 to 1969. He went to college in California, enrolling at Alliant International University and the University of California, Berkeley. His eldest brother, Miles Copeland III (born 1944), founded I.R.S. Records and became the Police's manager. He has also overseen Copeland's interests in other music projects. His other brother, Ian Copeland (1949–2006), was a pioneering booking agent who represented the Police and many others.

== Career ==
=== Curved Air (1975–1976) ===
Returning to England, Copeland worked as road manager for the progressive rock band Curved Air's 1974 reunion tour, and then as drummer for the band during 1975 and 1976. The band kicked off with a European tour, which started poorly. Band leader Darryl Way, a notorious perfectionist, grew impatient with the struggling of his bandmates, especially novice drummer Copeland. Then, for reasons no one could pinpoint, the musicians suddenly "clicked" with each other and the band caught fire, quickly becoming a popular and acclaimed live act.

Eventually, Way left the band, and after months of gradually losing steam, Curved Air broke up so quietly that, by singer Sonja Kristina's recollections, most of the music press wrote off the band's absence as a "sabbatical". Copeland went on to form the Police, and Kristina and Way both pursued solo careers. Kristina and Copeland maintained the close personal relationship they'd formed while bandmates and were married in 1982.

=== The Police (1977–1986) ===
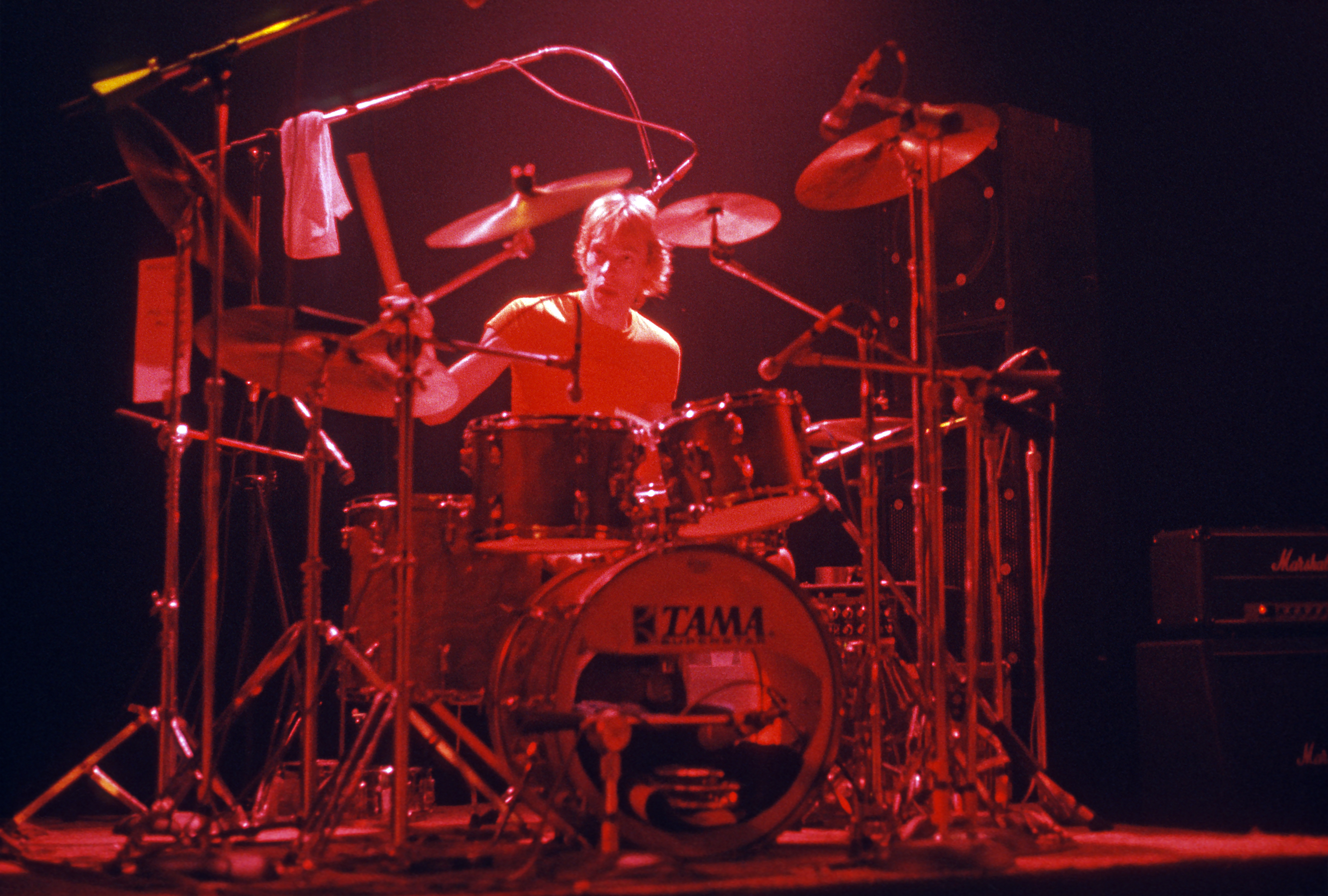
Copeland performing with the Police in 1979

In early 1977, Copeland founded the Police with lead singer-bass guitarist Sting and guitarist Henry Padovani (who was soon replaced by Andy Summers), and they became one of the top bands of the late 1970s and early 1980s. Copeland was the youngest member of the band. The Police's early track list (before their album debut) was largely Copeland compositions, including the band's first single "Fall Out" (Illegal Records, 1977) and the B-side "Nothing Achieving". Though Copeland's songwriting contribution was reduced to a couple of songs per album as Sting started writing more material, he continued to co-arrange all the Police's songs together with his two bandmates. Amongst Copeland's most notable songs are "On Any Other Day" (where he also sang lead vocals), "Does Everyone Stare" (later to be used as the title of his documentary on the band Everyone Stares: The Police Inside Out), "Contact", "Bombs Away", "Darkness" and "Miss Gradenko". Copeland also co-wrote several songs with Sting, including "Peanuts", "Landlord", "It's Alright for You", and "Re-Humanize Yourself".

Copeland also recorded under the pseudonym Klark Kent, releasing several UK singles in 1978 with one ("Don't Care") entering the UK singles chart that year, along with an eponymous 10-inch album on green vinyl released in 1980. Recording at Nigel Gray's Surrey Sound Studios, Copeland played all the instruments and sang the lead vocals himself. Kent's "Don't Care", which peaked at No. 48 UK in August 1978, actually predates the first chart single by the Police by several months ("Can't Stand Losing You", issued in October 1978) as "Don't Care" was released in early June 1978.

In 1982, Copeland was involved in the production of a WOMAD benefit album called Music and Rhythm. Copeland's score for Rumble Fish secured him a Golden Globe nomination in 1983. The film, directed and produced by Francis Ford Coppola from the S. E. Hinton novel, also had a song released to radio on A&M Records "Don't Box Me In" (UK singles chart n. 91)—a collaboration between Copeland and singer-songwriter Stan Ridgway, leader of the band Wall of Voodoo—that received significant airplay upon release of the film that year.

The Rhythmatist record of 1985 was the result of a pilgrimage to Africa and its people, and it features local drums and percussion, with more drums, percussion, other musical instruments and occasional lead vocals added by Copeland. The album was the official soundtrack to the movie of the same name, which was co-written by Stewart. Copeland is seen in the film playing the drums in a cage with lions surrounding him. The Police attempted a reunion in 1986, but the project fell apart.

=== Solo projects and film soundtracks (1987–1998) ===
After the Police disbanded, Copeland established a career composing soundtracks for films (Airborne, Talk Radio, Wall Street, Riff Raff, Raining Stones, Surviving the Game, See No Evil, Hear No Evil, Highlander II: The Quickening, She's Having a Baby, The First Power, Fresh, Taking Care of Business, West Beirut, I am David, Riding the Bus with My Sister, Good Burger), television (The Equalizer, Dead Like Me, Star Wars: Droids, the pilot for Babylon 5 (1993), Nickelodeon's The Amanda Show, The Life and Times of Juniper Lee), operas (Holy Blood and Crescent Moon, commissioned by Cleveland Opera) and ballets (Prey' Ballet Oklahoma, Casque of Amontillado, Noah's Ark/Solcheeka, commissioned by the Seattle Symphony Orchestra, King Lear, commissioned by the San Francisco Ballet Company, Emilio). In 1996, Copeland provided the score for The Leopard Son, Discovery Channel's first commercially released full-length feature film, made by wildlife filmmaker Hugo van Lawick.

Copeland also occasionally played drums for other artists. Peter Gabriel employed Copeland to perform on his songs "Red Rain" and "Big Time" from his 1986 album So because of his "hi-hat mastery". That year he also teamed with Adam Ant to record the title track and video for the Anthony Michael Hall film Out of Bounds. In 1989, Copeland formed Animal Logic with jazz bassist Stanley Clarke and singer-songwriter Deborah Holland. The trio had success with their first album and world tour but broke up as the members wanted to pursue other projects. He has also played on albums by Mike Rutherford and Tom Waits.

In 1993 he composed the music for Channel 4's Horse Opera and director Bob Baldwin, and in 1999, he provided the voice of an additional American soldier in the animated musical comedy war film South Park: Bigger, Longer & Uncut (1999).

=== Spyro the Dragon soundtracks (1998–2002, 2018) ===
Copeland was commissioned by Universal Interactive and Insomniac Games in 1998 to make the musical score for the PlayStation game Spyro the Dragon. He would play through the levels first to get a feel for each one before composing the soundtrack. He also stayed with the project to create the musical scores for the remaining Insomniac sequels Spyro 2: Ripto's Rage! (1999) and Spyro: Year of the Dragon (2000). Universal Interactive had different developers handle the fourth title, Spyro: Enter the Dragonfly (2002), which would be Copeland's last outing with the series. While the soundtracks never saw commercial release, the limited edition of the fourth game came packaged with a bonus CD, containing unused tracks. The soundtracks were very well received, and one track would later appear on the 2007 compilation album The Stewart Copeland Anthology. Copeland composed a new title theme for Spyro Reignited Trilogy (2018).

This period also saw Copeland compose the soundtrack for Alone in the Dark: The New Nightmare (2001), his only video game soundtrack outside of the Spyro franchise to date.

=== Collaborations (2002–2006) ===
In 2000, he combined with Les Claypool of Primus (with whom he produced a track on the Primus album Antipop) and Trey Anastasio of Phish to create the band Oysterhead. That same year, he was approached by director Adam Collis to assemble the score for the film Sunset Strip.

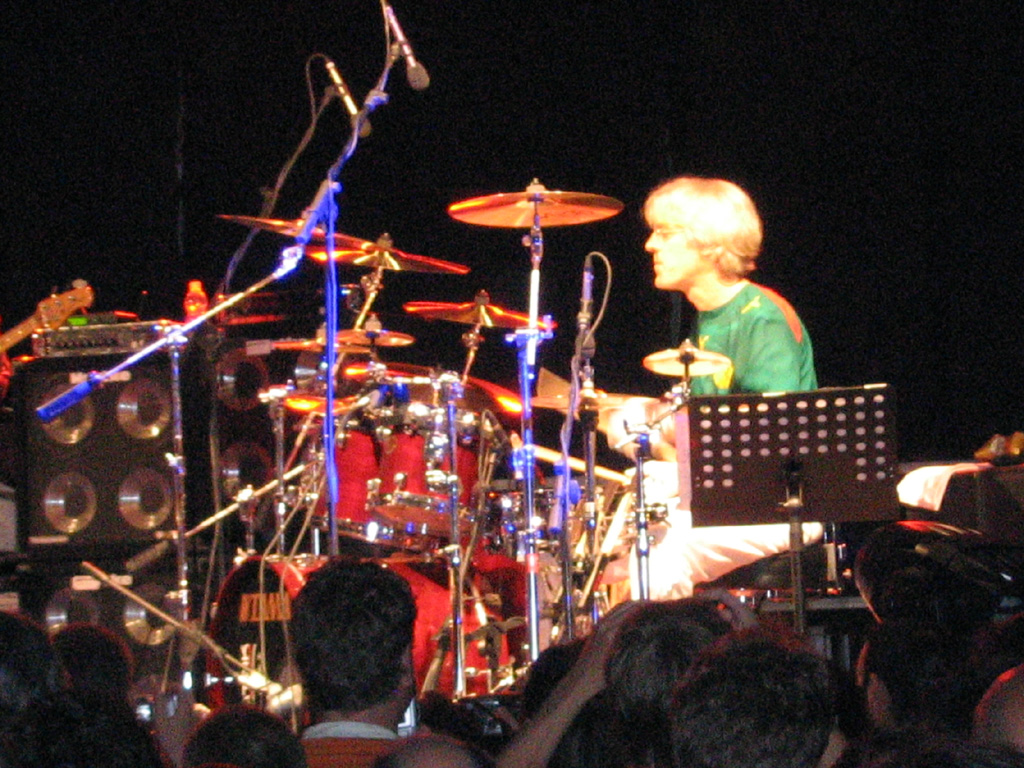
Copeland performing in 2006

In 2002, Copeland was hired by Ray Manzarek and Robby Krieger of the Doors to play with them for a new album and tour, but the tour was cut short.

In 2005, Copeland released "Orchestralli", a live recording of chamber ensemble music which he had composed during a short tour of Italy in 2002. Also in 2005, Copeland started Gizmodrome, a new project with avant-garde guitarist David Fiuczynski, multi-instrumentalist Vittorio Cosma, singer Raiz and bassist Max Gazzè. The band made their U.S. debut on September 16, 2006, at the Modern Drummer Drum Festival. In January 2006, Copeland premiered his film about the Police called Everyone Stares: The Police Inside Out at the Sundance Film Festival. In February and March, he appeared as one of the judges on the BBC television show Just the Two of Us (a role he later reprised for a second series in January 2007).

=== The Police reunion (2007–2008) ===
At the 2007 Grammy Awards, Copeland, Andy Summers and Sting performed the song "Roxanne" together again as the Police. This marked the band's first public performance since their induction into the Rock and Roll Hall of Fame in 2003. One day later, the band announced that in celebration of the Police's 30th anniversary, they would be embarking on what turned out to be a one-off reunion tour on May 28, 2007. During the tour, Copeland also released his compilation album The Stewart Copeland Anthology, which was composed of his independent work.

In 2007, the French government appointed Copeland (along with Police bandmates Summers and Sting) a Chevalier of the Ordre des Arts et des Lettres.

The group performed 151 dates across five continents, concluding with a final show in August 2008 at Madison Square Garden, New York.

=== Projects (Since 2008) ===
In 2008, RIM commissioned Copeland to write a "soundtrack" for the BlackBerry Bold smart phone. He created a highly percussive theme of one minute's length from which he evolved six ringtones and a softer 'alarm tone' that are preloaded on the device.

In March 2008, he premiered his orchestral composition "Celeste" at "An Evening with Stewart Copeland", part of the Savannah Music Festival. The performance featured classical violinist Daniel Hope. His appearance at Savannah included a screening of Everyone Stares: The Police Inside Out and a question and answer session. Also in 2008, he was commissioned by the Dallas Symphony Orchestra to create a percussion piece involving primarily Indonesian instruments. "Gamelan D'Drum" was first performed in Dallas on February 5, 2012, and had its European Premiere at the Royal Academy of Music in London in July 2012.

On August 21, 2009, at SummerFest 2009, Copeland unveiled the composition "Retail Therapy", which was commissioned by the Music Society. He performed three more original works: "Kaya", "Celeste", and "Gene Pool", the last accompanied by San Diego–based percussion ensemble red fish blue fish. He attended a composer's roundtable and a question and answer discussion in conjunction with the festival. Copeland wrote the score for a theatrical presentation of Ben-Hur, which premiered on September 17, 2009, at the O2 Arena in London. He provided English-language narration of the production, which is performed in Latin and Aramaic. His memoir Strange Things Happen: A Life with The Police, Polo, and Pygmies was released by HarperCollins in September 2009. The book chronicles events in his life from childhood through his work with the Police and to the present. In October 2009, he was a guest on Private Passions, the biographical music discussion program on BBC Radio 3.

On May 24, 2011, he started a YouTube channel devoted to his videos and project updates. On this channel, he uploads performances with various musicians, including Primus, Andy Summers, Jeff Lynne, Snoop Dogg, and others in his home studio, which he refers to as the Sacred Grove. On August 24, 2011, he was a featured soloist on the Late Show with David Letterman, as part of their second "Drum Solo Week".

On January 10, 2012, he appeared on an episode of the A&E reality series Storage Wars to appraise a drum set for Barry Weiss, buying a Turkish cymbal from the set for $40. In July he reunited with former Animal Logic bandmate Stanley Clarke for a European tour.

In May 2013, he and the Long Beach Opera premiered The Tale Tell Heart, an opera based on the short story by Edgar Allan Poe.

On November 26, 2013, he appeared in the first episode of The Tim Ferriss Experiment.

In 2017, he reformed Gizmodrome as a supergroup with Adrian Belew, Vittorio Cosma, and Mark King and released an album of the same name. That album peaked at No. 14 on the UK Independent Albums chart.

Ricky Kej and Copeland previously worked together on a song in 2016. During a pause in concerts and overall activity due to the COVID-19 pandemic, Kej reached out to Copeland. The duo eventually collaborated on a studio album entitled Divine Tides. This album was released in 2021 alongside eight music videos shot in locations ranging from the Himalayas in India, to forests in Spain.

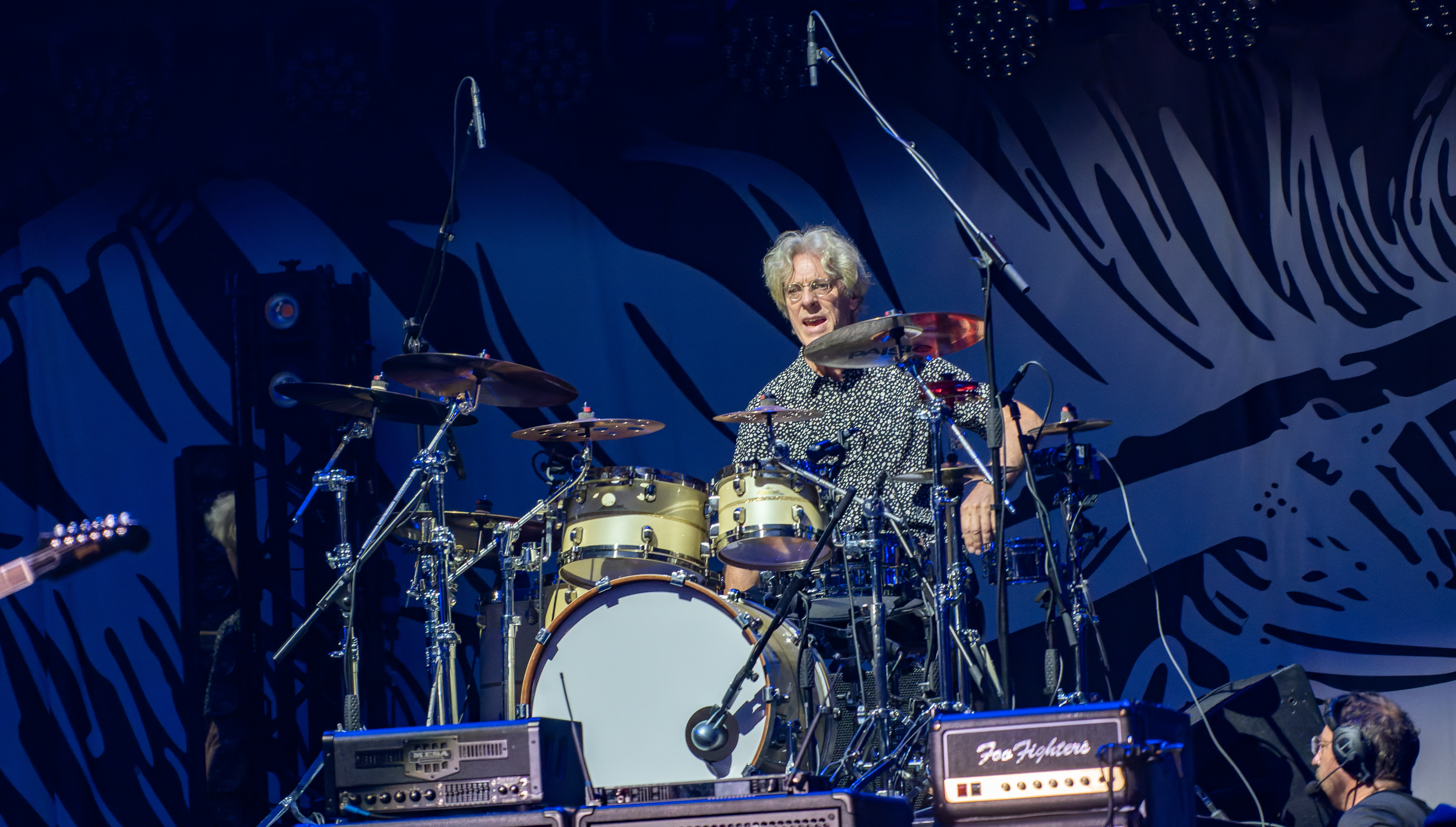
Copeland performing in 2022

On September 5, 2021, the opera Electric Saint about the life of Nikola Tesla by Copeland with libretto by Jonathan Moore premiered at the National Theater of Weimar.

In 2022, he was appointed a Visiting Scholar at McGill University in the laboratory of Dr. Daniel J. Levitin, during which time they co-wrote the chapter "What Can the Performing Arts Learn from Empirical Time Research? Timing, Tempo and Rhythm: Evidence from the Laboratory and the Concert Stage" for the Oxford University Press book "Performing Time: Synchrony and Temporal Flow in Music and Dance."

On February 6, 2023, the album Divine Tides brought Copeland his seventh Grammy Award and Ricky Kej his third Grammy Award in the 65th Annual Grammy Awards in the category of Best Immersive Audio Album.

In 2025, Copeland collaborated with British audio naturalist Martyn Stewart on Wild Concerto, an album featuring Stewart's audio recordings of animals.

== Personal life ==
In 1974, Copeland became romantically involved with Curved Air vocalist Sonja Kristina; they were married from 1982 to 1991. He adopted her son from a previous relationship, and they had two sons of their own. In 1981, he fathered a son with Marina, the daughter of Irish author Desmond Guinness and Mariga Guinness. He currently lives in Los Angeles with his second wife Fiona, with whom he has three children.

Copeland's hobbies include rollerskating, cycling along the beach in Santa Monica, filmmaking, and playing polo. He is also active on his YouTube channel, where he uploads videos of himself and other musicians during jam sessions in his studio, the Sacred Grove.

== Drumming style ==
Copeland grew up listening to a combination of Lebanese music, rock and roll, jazz, and reggae, but he selected from these styles what he needed rather than imitating them. In the 1980s, when many musicians were looking for bigger sound from bigger drums, he added Octobans. Invented by Tama Drums in 1978, Octobans consisted of eight six-inch drums in the shape of narrow tubes. He used another innovation, a splash cymbal based on a toy that he owned and that he helped Paiste design. He relied heavily on his 13" hi-hats.

== Equipment ==
Copeland's equipment includes Tama drums, Paiste cymbals, Remo drum heads, and Vater signature drum sticks.

=== Original live kit set-up (1984) ===
- Tama Imperialstar Mahogany Drums (9-ply) and Paiste Cymbals:
- Drums – Midnight Blue
  - 10x8" Rack Tom
  - 12x8" Rack Tom
  - 13x9" Rack Tom
  - 16x16" Floor Tom
  - 14x5" Pearl B4514 Chrome over Brass Snare Drum
  - 22x14" Bass Drum
  - Tama Octobans Low Pitch (x4)
  - Cowbell
  - Wood Blocks
- Cymbals – Paiste
  - 13" Formula 602 Medium Hi-Hats
  - 16" 2002 Crash
  - 8" 2002 Bell
  - 7.5 Ufip Ictus Bell
  - 8" 2002 Splash (x2)
  - 11" 2002 Splash
  - 14" (or 16") Rude Crash/Ride
  - 16" (or 18") Rude Crash/Ride
  - 18" 2002 Medium
  - 24" Rude Ride/Crash
  - 20" 2002 China
  - Simmons (x2) Pads (to his left)
  - Assorted Percussion
  - Stewart also used Calato Regal Tip Rock Wood Tipped Drumsticks

=== The Police Reunion (2007–2008) tour kit ===
- Tama Starclassic Maple Drums and Paiste Cymbals:
- Drums – Custom Police Blue Sparkle Maple Wood
  - 10x8" Tom
  - 12x8" Tom (To the left of his snare drum)
  - 13x9" Tom
  - 16x16" Floor Tom
  - 18x16" Floor Tom
  - 20x14" Tama Gong Drum
  - 22x18" Bass Drum
  - 14x5" Tama SC145 Stewart Copeland Signature Snare
  - Tama Custom Police Blue Sparkle Octobans (x4) (custom made for Copeland)
- Cymbals – Paiste
  - 12" Prototype Micro Hi-Hats
  - 16" Signature Full Crash
  - 17" Signature Fast Crash
  - 18" Signature Fast Crash
  - 18" Signature Full Crash
  - 18" 2002 Flat Ride (prototype)
  - 22" Signature Blue Bell Ride
  - 10" Signature Splash
  - 8" Signature Bell
  - 8" Signature Prototype Splash
  - Assorted percussion
- Stewart also uses his own Vater Stewart Copeland Standard Sticks.

== Discography ==
=== Studio albums ===
- 1980: Klark Kent: Music Madness from the Kinetic Kid (as Klark Kent)
- 1985: The Rhythmatist
- 1988: The Equalizer and Other Cliff Hangers
- 1995: Kollected Works (as Klark Kent)
- 2003: La Notte della Taranta (Live in Melpignano 17.08.2003)
- 2005: Orchestralli (live album)
- 2007: The Stewart Copeland Anthology (compilation)
- 2009: Music from Ben Hur Live
- 2023: Police Deranged for Orchestra
- 2023: Klark Kent Deluxe Edition (as Klark Kent)
- 2025: Wild Concerto

=== Curved Air ===
- 1975: Midnight Wire
- 1976: Airborne

=== The Police ===
- Outlandos d'Amour (1978)
- Reggatta de Blanc (1979)
- Zenyatta Mondatta (1980)
- Ghost in the Machine (1981)
- Brimstone and Treacle (1982)
- Synchronicity (1983)
- Every Breath You Take: The Singles (1986)
- Message in a Box: The Complete Recordings (1993)
- Live! (1995)
- The Police (2007)
- Certifiable: Live in Buenos Aires (2008)

=== Animal Logic ===
- Animal Logic (1989)
- Animal Logic II (1991)

=== Oysterhead ===
- The Grand Pecking Order (2001)
- 2020/02/14 Broomfield, CO (2020)
- 2020/02/15 Broomfield, CO (2020)

=== Gizmodrome ===
- Gizmodrome (2017)
- Gizmodrome Live (2021)

=== Collaborations ===
- 1977: Strontium 90: Police Academy by Strontium 90
- 1982: Acting Very Strange by Mike Rutherford
- 1986: So by Peter Gabriel
- 1989: Mr. Doubles by Moon on the Water
- 1990: One World One Voice by Various
- 2002: Alice by Tom Waits
- 2002: Blood Money by Tom Waits
- 2005: Crossing Times And Continents by Eberhard Schoener & Friends (with Sting and Andy Summers)
- 2021: Divine Tides with Ricky Kej
- 2023: Police Beyond Borders with Ricky Kej

=== Film scores ===
Title	Year	Director	Notes
Rumble Fish	1983	Francis Ford Coppola	
The Rhythmatist	1985	Jean-Pierre Dutilleux	Documentary, also actor
Out of Bounds	1986	Richard Tuggle	
Wall Street	1987	Oliver Stone	
Talk Radio	1988	Oliver Stone	
She's Having a Baby	1988	John Hughes	
The Jogger	1988	Robert Resnikoff	
See No Evil, Hear No Evil	1989	Arthur Hiller	
Taking Care of Business	1990	Arthur Hiller	
The First Power	1990	Robert Resnikoff	
Men at Work	1990	Emilio Estevez	
Hidden Agenda	1990	Ken Loach	
Riff Raff	1991	Ken Loach	
Highlander II: The Quickening	1991	Russell Mulcahy	
Murder in High Places	1991	John Byrum	TV movie
Final Verdict	1991	Jack Fisk	TV movie
Fugitive Among Us	1992	Michael Toshiyuki Uno	TV movie
Laws of Gravity	1992	Nick Gomez	
Afterburn	1992	Robert Markowitz	TV movie
Lorenzo's Oil	1992	George Miller	
Horse Opera	1993	Bob Baldwin	TV movie
Wide Sargasso Sea	1993	John Duigan	
Airborne	1993	Rob Bowman	
Raining Stones	1993	Ken Loach	
Bank Robber	1993	Nick Mead	
Surviving the Game	1994	Ernest Dickerson	
Decadence	1994	Steven Berkoff	
Rapa-Nui	1994	Kevin Reynolds	
Fresh	1994	Boaz Yakin	
Silent Fall	1994	Bruce Beresford	
Judgement	1995	David Winkler	Short
White Dwarf	1995	Peter Markle	TV movie
Tyson	1995	Uli Edel	TV movie
The Assassination File	1996	John Harrison	TV movie
The Leopard Son	1996	Hugo van Lawick	Documentary
SubUrbia	1996	Richard Linklater	
Boys	1996	Stacy Cochran	
The Pallbearer	1996	Matt Reeves	
Gridlock'd	1997	Vondie Curtis-Hall	
Anna Karenina	1997	Bernard Rose	
Four Days in September	1997	Bruno Barreto	
Good Burger	1997	Brian Robbins	
Kiss Me, Guido	1997	Tony Vitale	
Little Boy Blue	1997	Antonio Tibaldi	
Two Girls and a Guy	1997	James Toback	
Welcome to Woop Woop	1997	Stephan Elliott	Special thanks
The Taking of Pelham One Two Three	1998	Félix Enríquez Alcalá	TV movie
Sour Grapes	1998	Larry David	
Your Friends & Neighbors	1998	Neil LaBute	
Pecker	1998	John Waters	
Futuresport	1998	Ernest R. Dickerson	TV movie
Legalese	1998	Glenn Jordan	TV movie
West Beirut	1998	Ziad Doueiri	
Very Bad Things	1998	Peter Berg	
Simpatico	1999	Matthew Warchus	
She's All That	1999	Robert Iscove	
Boys and Girls	2000	Robert Iscove	
More Dogs Than Bones	2000	Michael Browning	
3 Strikes	2000	DJ Pooh	
Sunset Strip	2000	Adam Collis	
Skipped Parts	2001	Tamra Davis	
The Center of the World	2001	Wayne Wang	
On the Line	2001	Eric Bross	
Deuces Wild	2002	Scott Kalvert	
Me and Daphne	2002	Rebecca Gayheart	
I Am David	2003	Paul Feig	
Evel Knievel	2003	John Badham	TV movie
Amazon Forever	2004	Jean-Pierre Dutilleux	
Love Wrecked	2005	Randal Kleiser	TV movie
Riding the Bus with My Sister	2005	Anjelica Huston	TV movie
Fish Eye	2005	Jordan Copeland	Short
National Lampoon's Pucked	2006	Arthur Hiller	With Kat Green, Billy Lincoln and Rich McCulley
Everyone Stares	2006	Stewart Copeland	Documentary, also director, producer and narrator
We Are Your Friends	2015	Max Joseph	
Under the Volcano	2021	Gracie Otto	Documentary

=== TV series ===
Title	Year	Notes
The Young Ones	1984	1 episode ("Cash"). Appears as a member of Ken Bishop's Nice Twelve.
The Equalizer	1985	
Star Wars: Droids	1985	Theme music only, co-written with Derek Holt
Shalom Salaam	1989	Miniseries
Long Ago and Far Away	1989	1 episode ("Noah's Ark"), was also released as an audiobook.
Babylon 5	1994	Pilot only
Insiders	1997	Miniseries
The Amanda Show	1999–2002	
Brutally Normal	2000	
Breaking News	2002	
Dead Like Me	2003–2004	
Desperate Housewives	2004	1 episode ("Who's That Woman?")
The Life and Times of Juniper Lee	2005–2007	Co-wrote theme music with Rob Cuariclia, David Lehner and Rob Lehner
Amas de Casa Desesperadas	2008	1 episode ("¿Quién es esa mujer?")
Stewart Copeland's Adventures in Music	2020	TV mini-series, presenter

=== Video games ===
Title	Year	Producer(s)/Developer(s)	Notes
Urban Strike	1994	Electronic Arts, Granite Bay Software, Foley Hi-Tech	Special thanks
Spyro the Dragon	1998	Universal Interactive, Insomniac Games	
Spyro 2: Ripto's Rage!	1999	Universal Interactive, Insomniac Games	
Spyro: Year of the Dragon	2000	Universal Interactive, Insomniac Games	With Ryan Beveridge
Alone in the Dark: The New Nightmare	2001	Infogrames, Darkworks	With Thierry Desseaux
Spyro: Enter the Dragonfly	2002	Universal Interactive, Check Six Studios, Equinoxe Digital Entertainment	With Peter Neff and Kenneth Burgomaster
Guitar Hero: World Tour	2008	Activision, Neversoft	Music thanks
Spyro Reignited Trilogy	2018	Activision, Toys for Bob	Original music, main theme, assisted with remastered tracks

== See also ==
- List of drummers
- Membranophone (list of drums)
