= Klark Kent (album) =

1980 EP by Klark Kent

EP by Klark Kent
- Released: 1980
- Studio: Surrey Sound Studios
- Genres: New wave, pop, rock
- Length: 24:44
- Label: A&M
- Producers: Stewart Copeland, Nigel Gray

Klark Kent chronology
Klark Kent (1980)	Rumble Fish (1983)

Klark Kent is the debut solo album by Stewart Copeland, and the first solo album recorded by any band member of the Police. The album was released in June 1980 as a 10-inch EP on green vinyl. It was later re-released on black vinyl as a 12 inch with a grey and black sleeve. It includes the song "Don't Care", which had entered the UK Top 50 two years earlier.

== Background ==
Copeland originally intended to record "Don't Care" with the Police. However, Sting had difficulties identifying with the lyrics and felt he could not do it justice. Sensing that the song had potential, Copeland later recorded it himself, playing all the instruments and singing. In order not to disrupt the career of The Police, which at the time was an emerging band, Copeland chose to record under the pseudonym Klark Kent. Released as a single by A&M in 1978, "Don't Care" reached number 48 in the UK Singles Chart When Klark Kent was subsequently invited to Top of the Pops to perform the song, Copeland, Sting, Andy Summers, Kim Turner, Florian Pilkington-Miksa and Miles Copeland showed up wearing masks to disguise their identity. Copeland's voice could not be heard through the mask, which was also deemed as particularly scary by the show's producers, so he eventually had to drop it in favour of heavy make-up and shades, making his real identity quite clear.

The success of "Don't Care" prompted Copeland to record and release three other singles - "Too Kool to Kalypso", "Away from Home" and "Ritch in a Ditch". Promotional videos were shot for "Away from Home" and "Too Kool to Kalypso". Eventually the project solidified in an album comprising eight tracks. The "t" from "Ritch in a Ditch" was omitted from the album version. Like the first two of The Police's albums, Klark Kent was recorded on a minimal budget at Surrey Sound Studios in Leatherhead, with Nigel Gray engineering. Some of the music and themes in the album reflect Copeland's songwriting for The Police. They are normally in an upbeat tempo and address with sarcasm issues like suburban living and Third World politics. The song "Guerrilla" features some Arabic words Copeland learned while growing up in Beirut. The main riff of the song "Excess" would be re-used later for the soundtrack of the feature film Rumble Fish. "Theme from Kinetic Ritual" would later be used by MTV as the opening theme of the show The Cutting Edge (which was produced by I.R.S. Records, run by Stewart Copeland's brother Miles Copeland. Stewart Copeland disseminated a few hints about his real identity in the design of the album. In the inner sleeve there is a collage of pictures where a photograph of the Police performing with Henry Padovani is visible. In all the pictures in the album Copeland can be seen wearing a black and yellow sweater with hooped stripes in reference to how Sting originally earned his nickname. The single "Don't Care" also includes the line "You know I'm fooling with my fake I.D./So you don't need to check my history".

Klark Kent was released on CD in Japan in 1986, and re-issued in 1991 on the Pony Canyon imprint. For unknown reasons, these were released with the name "Klerk Kant". Rumours suggest that this was due to potential litigation with DC Comics, owners of the "Clark Kent" name. All eight tracks on the EP were later collected in the 1995 album Kollected Works, with all of the Klark Kent single-only tracks.

== Reception ==
Professional ratings
Review scores
Source	Rating
Allmusic	2/5 stars
Smash Hits	7/10

When the Klark Kent album came out, the Police had just released Zenyatta Mondatta and were at the peak of their success, and as such it got a lot of media attention. It was widely assumed that this was Copeland working under a pseudonym. Copeland initially denied being Klark Kent, stating that Kent was just a friend and that he helped him produce the album. In an interview on Australian TV in 1981 he stated that Kent was a young Hungarian ballet instructor trained by the CIA. Eventually he admitted his involvement. Reviewing the album for Smash Hits in 1980, Red Starr described the album as "unpretentious" and "light-hearted" and the songs as "energetic, utterly straightforward and reasonably tuneful, if a bit lacking in the lyrical department". He went on to say the musicianship was "excellent" and "relaxed and inventive".

== Track listing ==
All songs written by Klark Kent.

Side one

1. "Don't Care" – 2:08
2. "Away from Home" – 2:55
3. "Ritch in a Ditch" – 2:46
4. "Grandelinquent" – 3:09

Side two

1. "Guerilla" – 3:32
2. "My Old School" – 2:44
3. "Excess" – 3:12
4. "Theme for Kinetic Ritual" – 4:18

== Releases ==
1980. AMLE 68511. A&M Records. UK

1980. SP 70600. IRS Records. US

1986. D32Y3130. A&M Records. Japan

1991. PCCY-10276. A&M Records. Japan

== Kollected Works ==
Kollected Works

Compilation album by Klark Kent
- Released: 1995
- Recorded: 1978–1995
- Genres: New wave, rock music, pop
- Length: 37:26
- Label: Capitol
- Producers: Stewart Copeland, Nigel Gray

Klark Kent chronology
Talk Radio/Wall Street (1988)	Kollected Works (1995)	Orchestralli (2004)

Kollected Works is a compilation of songs that Stewart Copeland wrote under the pseudonym Klark Kent released on CD in 1995. It includes all the songs from Klark Kent, four "Klark Kent" non-album single tracks ("Too Kool to Kalypso", "Office Girls", "Thrills" and "Office Talk"), a new version of "Love Lessons", a song originally recorded by Colts (Stewart Copeland and Derek Holt) in 1986, and two previously unreleased tracks, "Strange Things Happen" and "Stay Ready". "Strange Things Happen" had been recorded around the time of Copeland's journey to Africa prior to producing his LP and film The Rhythmatist (1985). It was left off the album and an alternative, slightly longer version was given to the soundtrack album of The Texas Chainsaw Massacre 2 in 1986. Like the new version of "Love Lessons", "Stay Ready" uses a drum machine instead of drums. Both previously unreleased tracks were recorded at The Worried Rabbit Studio in Assyria. Copeland recorded another track "Yo Ho Ho" under the pseudonym Klark Kent. The song was released on the I.R.S. Records compilation album Just in Time for Christmas in 1990. "Too Kool to Kalypso" would eventually find its way onto Copeland's album The Stewart Copeland Anthology, marking the first release of a song originally recorded as Klark Kent under his real name.

In the Police's 1993 box set Message in a Box: The Complete Recordings, Sting commented for the first time on his decision not to sing "Don't Care" and why he thought the song was a better fit for Copeland, stating, "Stewart is good at being arrogant in a funny way. As in the Klark Kent's line 'If you don't like my arrogance, you can suck my socks'".

== Reception ==
Professional ratings
Review scores
Source	Rating
Allmusic	4.5/5 stars

In a retrospective review, Paul Collins of Allmusic panned the Klark Kent album, arguing that Copeland only recorded it for ego-driven reasons, and that his vocals make the songs unbearable. He concluded "the album only really succeeds when Copeland sticks to instrumentals". Despite this, Allmusic also made Kollected Works an album pick and published a review by Richard Foss declaring it to be "inventive new wave pop of the highest order" and "a record that combined the musical sensibilities of the Police and the lyrical concerns of Weird Al Yankovic". Foss applauded the album's humor and eccentricity, while contending that the tracks also have plenty of musical depth to make them hold up to repeated listens.

== Personnel ==
- Stewart Copeland – Vocals, drums, guitar, bass guitar, piano, typewriter, kazoo, synthesizer, drum machine on "Stay Ready" and "Love Lessons".
