= Love & Life (Mary J. Blige album) =

Studio album by Mary J. Blige
- Released: August 26, 2003
- Genre: R&B
- Length: 70:41
- Label: Geffen
- Producers: Mary J. Blige; Andy C.; Sean "Diddy" Combs; Malik Crosby; D-Dot; D-Nat; Dr. Dre; Mike Elizondo; Ron Feemster; Sean Foote; Majid Hasan; Mechalie Jamison; Stevie J; Kay Gee; Kipper; Donald Lawrence; Herb Middleton; Cecil Sanchez; Sting; Mario Winans

Mary J. Blige chronology
No More Drama (2001)	Love & Life (2003)	The Breakthrough (2005)

Singles from Love & Life
- 1. "Love @ 1st Sight" Released: June 20, 2003; 2. "Ooh!" Released: August 25, 2003; 3. "Whenever I Say Your Name" Released: November 10, 2003; 4. "Not Today" Released: November 24, 2003; 5. "It's a Wrap" Released: October 29, 2004

Love & Life is the sixth studio album by American R&B recording artist Mary J. Blige. It was released by Geffen Records on August 26, 2003. The album marked Blige's debut on the Geffen label, following the absorption of her former record company MCA Records. In addition, it saw her reuniting with Sean "Diddy" Combs, executive producer of her first two studio albums What's the 411? (1992) and My Life (1994), who wrote and executive produced most of Love & Life with his Bad Boy in-house production team The Hitmen, including Mario Winans, D-Dot, and Stevie J.

Love & Life was released to positive reception from music critics, who applauded Blige's vocal performances and her collaboration with Combs on most of the songs. Commercially, it became her second album to debut at the top of the US Billboard 200 chart with 285,298 copies. Though less successful than its predecessor No More Drama (2001), the album was eventually certified platinum by the RIAA. Internationally, it entered the top ten in Canada, Sweden, Switzerland, and the United Kingdom. Love & Life also received numerous accolades, earning Blige her first nomination for Best Contemporary R&B Album at the 46th Grammy ceremony.

In support of the album, five singles from the album were released. Lead single "Love @ 1st Sight", a collaboration with rapper Method Man, and second single "Ooh!" both reached the top thirty of the US Billboard 100 chart and peaked within the top forty on most charts they appeared on. "Not Today" featuring rapper Eve, "Whenever I Say Your Name", a duet with singer Sting, and final single "It's a Wrap" were less successful. In April and May 2004, Blige promoted Love & Life in her Love & Life concert tour, which visited several cities throughout the United States.

== Background ==
Citing creative differences, Blige and mentor Sean "Diddy" Combs parted ways after the release of her multi-platinum second album My Life (1994). The pair reconnected in 2001, when Combs was consulted to produce a remix for Blige's single "No More Drama" from her album of the same name. Following its release, they decided to join forces on Blige's No More Drama Tour, during which Blige and Combs performed a few of their hit singles from What's the 411? (1992) and 1994’s My Life (1994). The warm reception from the tour led them to believe that Blige’s next project was the perfect opportunity to try and recapture the magic of previous collaborations.

Combs, who declared Love & Life a continuation of My Life, consulted The Hitmen, the in-house production team of his Bad Boy label, including Stevie J., D-Dot, and Mario Winans, to work with Blige and him on the album, with Dr. Dre being the main outlier. Additional producers include Theron Feemster, Kay Gee, Kipper, and Donald Lawrence, while guest appearances were provided by rappers Method Man, 50 Cent, Jay Z, and Eve, with singer Sting appearing on reissue bonus track "Whenever I Say Your Name," initially recorded with Blige for his 2003 album Sacred Love.

== Critical reception ==
Professional ratings
Aggregate scores
Source	Rating
Metacritic	72/100
Review scores
Source	Rating
AllMusic	3.5/5 stars
Blender	3/5 stars
Encyclopedia of Popular Music	3/5 stars
Entertainment Weekly	B−
LAUNCH	8/10 stars
Los Angeles Times	3/4 stars
Q	2/5 stars
Rolling Stone	3/5 stars
Slant Magazine	3.5/5 stars
Vibe	3.5/5

Love & Life received generally positive reviews from critics. At Metacritic, which assigns a normalized rating out of 100 to reviews from mainstream publications, the album received an average score of 72, based on 10 reviews. AllMusic editor Andy Kellman wrote that while the positive attitude of Love & Life creates a "distance that holds the album back from being one of her best [...] at least half a dozen cuts will vie for slots on a future best-of." Rolling Stone writer Ernest Hardy believed that with Love & Life, Blige "solidifies her standing as the hood Oprah, offering songs of faith and affirmation [...] Her lyrics are confessional, with scant use of metaphor or simile, and little of the creative risk-taking of poetry – the point with Blige is relating, not memorable tunes."

PopMatters felt that with Love & Life, "Mary continues her trendsetting path, understanding that what works best for her is doing her, in whatever life stage she may be experiencing at the moment." Michael Paoletta from Billboard found the album "spirited, if uneven," and noted that it was "home to funky sensations, hip-hop attitude, and loved-up lyrics." Vibe editor Dimitri Ehrlich wrote that on Blige's "sixth studio album, it's the songs of sadness and anger that work best." In The Village Voice, Robert Christgau argued that the album's "selling point is a reborn P. Diddy overseeing a catchy set husbanded by many co-producers. It peaks in the middle, and [...] ends stronger than No More Drama. Up against What's the 411? Mary sounds older yet still girlish, rounder and smoother and pitch-improved but praise Shirley Brown not perfect yet."

Neil Drumming was more critical in Entertainment Weekly, focusing on the abundance of melancholy-heavy ballads and Combs' decision to rely on heavy sampling for most tracks, which he called "shallow, trebly echoes of their former selves." He noted that "despite her signature heartache-inducing voice," Blige could not "save Love & Life from her heavy-handed songwriting" and found that the lyrics to be "soggy with relationships" and lacking subtlety. Jonah Weiner of Blender commented that "practically every song sounds as though we've heard it before – because, well, we have." Q panned the record as mostly "a procession of syrupy ballads with added self-help litanies."

== Commercial performance ==
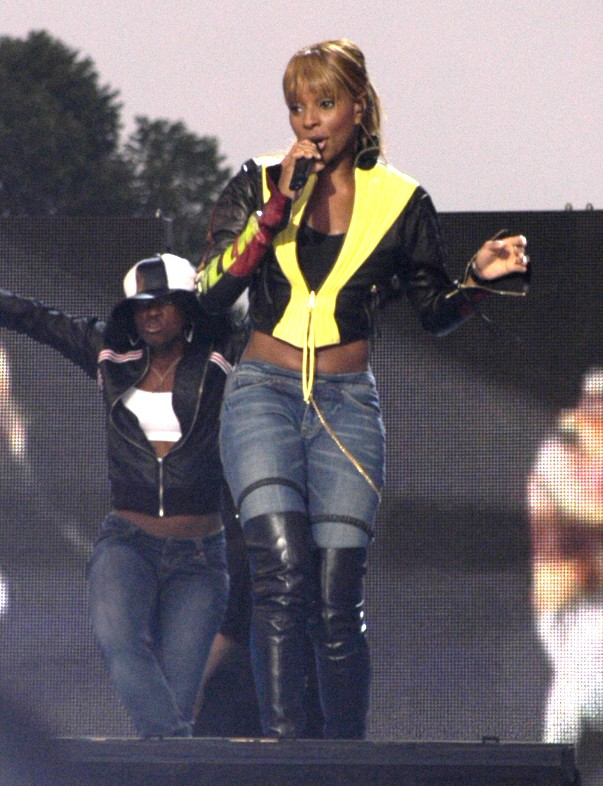
In the US, Love & Life became Blige's second number-one album.

In the United States, Love & Life debuted at number one on the Billboard 200 albums chart, selling 285,298 copies in first week. It became Blige's second number-one album on the chart, following 1997's Share My World. The album also opened at the top spot on Billboard's R&B/Hip-Hop Albums chart, marking Blige's sixth consecutive album to top the latter chart. MTV News noted that this feat lifted Blige "among music's most consistent artists on the albums chart," since from "her last four albums, three debuted in the top two slots, and the fourth took number nine. All of Blige's three most recent releases "each sold between 240,000 and 294,000 copies in the weeks they debuted". In October 2003, Love & Life was eventually certified platinum by the Recording Industry Association of America (RIAA), and as of 2009 the album has sold 1 million copies.

In the United Kingdom, Love & Life became Blige's fourth consecutive album to reach the top ten of the UK Albums Chart, debuting at number eight. In November 2003, it was certified silver by British Phonographic Industry (BPI), indicating sales of more than 60,000 units. Elsewhere, the album reached the top twenty in Denmark, France, Norway, and the Wallonian region of Belgium, and peaked at number six on the Canadian Albums Chart. Love & Life also entered the top three in Sweden and Switzerland, where it ranks among Blige's highest-charting albums as of 2016.

== Accolades and impact ==
Love & Life and its singles earned Blige numerous awards and nominations. At the 46th Grammy Awards, the album received a nomination for Best Contemporary R&B Album, losing to Beyoncé's Dangerously in Love. Meanwhile, the album's second single, "Ooh!" received a nomination for Best Female R&B Vocal Performance, also losing to "Dangerously in Love 2" by Beyoncé. The album's international third single, the Sting-featured "Whenever I Say Your Name" won a Grammy Award for Best Pop Collaboration with Vocals. The same year, Love & Life received a Best Female R&B/Soul Album nod at the 2004 Soul Train Music Awards, though it again lost to Dangerously in Love.

Despite its critical success, media journalists considered Love & Life a disappointment since it failed to duplicate the combined commercial success of previous album No More Drama (2001) and its parent singles such as "Family Affair" and "No More Drama". Blige later expressed discontent with the success of the project, citing both Combs's dominant role and the large group of collaborators on the project as pivotal. In a 2006 interview with Billboard, the singer stated that she "knew that Love & Life was something that disappointed [the fans]. None us were in a good place. Too many cooks spoiled the soup. You had [Diddy] saying 'Do this, do that' and I wanted something else". Blige also criticized record company executives for stepping in the recording process. In 2013, while commenting on her musical catalogue, she further remarked: "Love & Life was confusion and we didn’t know what the heck we were doing."

== Track listing ==
Love & Life – Standard edition
No.	Title	Writer(s)	Producer(s)	Length
1.	"Love & Life Intro" (featuring P. Diddy and Jay-Z)	Blige; Sean Combs; Shawn Carter; Dimitri Christo; Les McCann	Sean "Diddy" Combs; D-Nat; Stevie J	2:48
2.	"Don't Go"	Blige; Combs; Bruce Miller; Deric Angelettie; John Williams; Johnny Mercer	Combs; D-Dot	4:28
3.	"When We"	Blige; Combs; Mechalie Jamison; Andy Creamer; Mario Winans; Arthur "T-Boy" Ross; Leon Ware	Combs; Andy C.; Jamison	3:36
4.	"Not Today" (featuring Eve)	Blige; Miller; Andre Young; Theron Feemster; Mike Elizondo; Eve Jeffers	Dr. Dre; Mike Elizondo; Ron "Neff-U" Feemster	4:13
5.	"Finally Made It (Interlude)"	Blige; Combs; Angelettie; Richard Holland	Combs; D-Dot	1:39
6.	"Ooh!"	Blige; Combs; Jamison; Christo; Hamilton Bohannon	Combs; D-Nat	4:07
7.	"Let Me Be the 1" (featuring 50 Cent)	Blige; Combs; Jamison; Curtis Jackson; Malik Crosby; Cecil Sanchez; George Clinton; Sidney Barnes; Theresa Lindsey	Combs; Crosby; Sanchez	4:40
8.	"Love @ 1st Sight" (featuring Method Man)	Blige; Combs; Jamison; Winans; Clifford Smith; Steven Jordan; Kamaal Fareed; Ali Jones-Muhammed; Malik Taylor	Combs; Winans; Stevie J	5:18
9.	"Willing & Waiting"	Blige; Jamison; Creamer; David Lewis; Wayne Lewis	Combs; Andy C.; Jamison	4:19
10.	"Free (Interlude)"	Blige; Winans	Combs; Winans	2:04
11.	"Friends"	Blige; Sean Foote; Majid Hasan; Tom Brock; Robert Taylor; Barry White	Combs; Foote; Hasan; Winans^{[A]}	4:02
12.	"Press On"	Blige; Keir Gist; Charmelle Cofield; Darrell Crofts; Jimmy Seals	Combs; Kay Gee	4:17
13.	"Feel Like Makin' Love"	Blige; Combs; Jamison; Jordan	Combs; Stevie J	4:42
14.	"It's a Wrap"	Blige; Combs; Winans	Combs; Winans	4:20
15.	"Message in Our Music (Interlude)"	Blige; Robert Bell; Ronald Bell; George Brown; Robert Mickens; Claydes Smith; Alton Taylor; Dennis Thomas; Rick Westfield	Combs; Blige	2:14
16.	"All My Love"	Blige; Combs; Miller; Christo; Donald Addrisi; Richard Addrisi	Combs; D-Nat	4:16
17.	"Special Part of Me"	Blige; Combs; Winans	Combs; Winans	4:33
18.	"Ultimate Relationship (A.M.)"	Donald Lawrence; Steve White	Combs; Lawrence	5:05
Total length:				70:41

Love & Life – International bonus track
No.	Title	Writer(s)	Producer	Length
19.	"Didn't Mean"	Blige; Combs; Winans; Fareed; Taylor; Muhammad; J. Yancey	Combs; D-Nat	3:43
Total length:				74:24

Love & Life – Japanese bonus tracks
No.	Title	Writer(s)	Producer	Length
19.	"Happy Endings"	Blige; Herb Middleton	Middleton	5:13
20.	"If I Don't Love You This Way" (Jackson 5 cover)	Leon Ware; Pam Sawyer	Blige	4:01
Total length:				79:55

Love & Life – UK bonus tracks
No.	Title	Writer(s)	Producer	Length
19.	"Didn't Mean"	Blige; Combs; Winans; Fareed; Taylor; Muhammad; J. Yancey	Combs; D-Nat	3:43
20.	"If I Don't Love You This Way" (Jackson 5 cover)	Ware; Sawyer	Blige	4:01
Total length:				78:25

Love & Life – UK Reissue and Japanese Tour Edition bonus tracks
No.	Title	Writer(s)	Producer	Length
19.	"Didn't Mean"	Blige; Combs; Winans; Fareed; Taylor; Muhammad; J. Yancey	Combs; D-Nat	3:43
20.	"Whenever I Say Your Name" (featuring Sting)	Sting	Sting; Kipper	5:25
Total length:				79:49

Love & Life – North American Limited Edition Bonus DVD
No.	Title	Length
1.	"Love & Life" (Behind the Scenes Documentary)	42:05

Love & Life – Japanese Tour Edition Bonus DVD
No.	Title	Length
1.	"Love @ First Sight" (music video)	4:14
2.	"Not Today" (music video)	4:31
3.	"It's a Wrap" (music video)	5:19

Notes

- ^{^[A]} denotes co-producer.

Sample credits

- "Love & Life Intro" contains excerpts from "Morning Song", written by Les McCann.
- "Don't Go" contains a sample from "The Long Goodbye", performed by Lou Donaldson.
- "When We" contains a sample from "I Want You", performed by Marvin Gaye.
- "Finally Made It" contains a sample from "Better Days", performed by Rufus and Chaka Khan.
- "Ooh!" contains a sample from "Singing a Song for My Mother", performed by Bohannon.
- "Let Me Be the 1" contains a sample from "I'll Bet You", performed by Funkadelic.
- "Love @ 1st Sight" contains a sample from "Hot Sex", performed by A Tribe Called Quest.
- "Willing & Waiting" contains a sample from "When Love Calls", performed by Atlantic Starr.
- "Friends" contains a sample from "Mellow Mood Part I", performed by Barry White.
- "Press On" contains excerpts from "Summer Breeze", performed by Seals and Crofts.
- "Message in Our Music" contains a sample from "Summer Madness", performed by Kool & the Gang.
- "All My Love" contains excerpts from "Never My Love", performed by The Association.
- "Didn't Mean" contains excerpts from "Find a Way", performed by A Tribe Called Quest.

== Charts ==
=== Weekly charts ===
Weekly chart performance for Love & Life
Chart (2003)	Peak position
Australian Albums (ARIA)	62
Austrian Albums (Ö3 Austria)	49
Belgian Albums (Ultratop Flanders)	41
Belgian Albums (Ultratop Wallonia)	19
Canadian Albums (Billboard)	6
Canadian R&B Albums (Nielsen SoundScan)	19
Danish Albums (Hitlisten)	19
Dutch Albums (Album Top 100)	22
French Albums (SNEP)	18
German Albums (Offizielle Top 100)	21
Italian Albums (FIMI)	21
Japanese Albums (Oricon)	9
Norwegian Albums (VG-lista)	13
Scottish Albums (Official Charts)	28
Swedish Albums (Sverigetopplistan)	3
Swiss Albums (Schweizer Hitparade)	3
UK Albums (Official Charts)	8
UK R&B Albums (Official Charts)	3
US Billboard 200	1
US Top R&B/Hip-Hop Albums (Billboard)	1

=== Year-end charts ===
Year-end chart performance for Love & Life
Chart (2003)	Position
Swiss Albums (Schweizer Hitparade)	89
US Billboard 200	93
US Top R&B/Hip-Hop Albums (Billboard)	45

== Certifications ==
Certifications for Love & Life
Region	Certification	Certified units/sales
Japan (RIAJ)	Gold	100,000^{^}
United Kingdom (BPI)	Gold	100,000^{^}
United States (RIAA)	Platinum	1,000,000^{^}
^{^} Shipments figures based on certification alone.

== See also ==
- List of Billboard 200 number-one albums of 2003
- List of Billboard number-one R&B albums of 2003
