= A Thousand Years (Sting song) =

Song by Sting

from the album Brand New Day
- Released: 27 September 1999
- Genre: Pop; world
- Length: 5:58
- Label: A&M
- Songwriters: Sting; Kipper
- Producers: Sting; Kipper

"A Thousand Years" is a song by English musician Sting, released as the opening track on his sixth studio album, Brand New Day. While not released as a single, the song has remained a fan favorite and is often noted for its meditative tone and poetic lyrics. It has been included in Sting's live performances and remixed versions of his music.

== Background and composition ==
Sting has described "A Thousand Years" as a song that explores themes of eternal longing, spiritual connection, and timeless love. In a 1999 interview on NPR's World Cafe, he elaborated that the track is "an attempt to express the idea that love can exist outside the dimension of time." The song is characterized by its slow tempo, layered instrumentation, and atmospheric production.

The track features guitar work by Dominic Miller, as well as synthesizers, ambient textures, and ethereal backing vocals. It was produced by Sting and Kipper and recorded during sessions for Brand New Day between 1998 and 1999.

== Reception ==
Though not released as a single, "A Thousand Years" received positive reviews from critics. The Daily Vault called it "classic Sting," highlighting its "simply gorgeous" arrangement and emotional weight. The Los Angeles Times described the song as "a sensual and spiritual opener to an album rooted in personal exploration."

On streaming platforms, the song has gained popularity over time. As of 2025, the studio version has over 17 million streams on Spotify, making it one of the most listened to non-single tracks in Sting's catalog.

== Live performances ==
Sting has performed the song during several of his tours, including the Brand New Day Tour, Symphonicity Tour, and Live in Berlin. The song has been used as an opening piece in some concerts due to its slow-building intro and reflective tone.

A live orchestral version of the song appears on the 2010 album Live in Berlin, accompanied by the Royal Philharmonic Concert Orchestra.

== Legacy ==
While not a charting hit, the song has maintained a presence in Sting's live repertoire and is regarded by fans as one of his more emotionally resonant compositions. Its ambient style and spiritual lyrics stand in contrast to some of the more upbeat tracks on Brand New Day, offering a reflective counterpoint to songs like "Desert Rose" and "Brand New Day".

== Appears on ==
- Brand New Day (1999) – studio version
- Still Be Love in the World (2001) – Nitin Sawhney remix
- ...All This Time (2001) – live version
- Live in Berlin (2010) – live orchestral version

== Personnel ==
- Sting – vocals, bass, production
- Kipper – keyboards, programming, production
- Dominic Miller – guitar
- Additional musicians – backing vocals, synth layers
