= Not Today (Mary J. Blige song) =

Single by Mary J. Blige featuring Eve

from the album Love & Life and Barbershop 2: Back in Business
- Released: November 24, 2003
- Genre: Hip hop soul; R&B; hip hop
- Length: 4:13
- Label: Geffen
- Songwriters: Mary J. Blige; Eve Jeffers; Andre Young; Mike Elizondo; Theron Feemster; Bruce Miller
- Producer: Dr. Dre

Mary J. Blige singles chronology
"Whenever I Say Your Name" (2003)	"Not Today" (2003)	"It's a Wrap" (2004)

Eve singles chronology
"Satisfaction" (2003)	"Not Today" (2004)	"Rich Girl" (2004)

"Not Today" is a song recorded by American singer Mary J. Blige for her sixth studio album Love & Life (2003). It features a guest appearance from rapper Eve. The song was written by Blige, Eve, Mike Elizondo, Theron Feemster, Bruce Miller, and Dr. Dre, while production was helmed by the latter. Built upon a "plinking beat", it lyrically emphasizes the theme of broken promises and consequent end of the relationship.

"Not Today" was released as the third single from Love & Life, and the lead single from the Barbershop 2: Back in Business (2004) soundtrack, on November 24, 2003, by Geffen Records. It received widespread acclaim from music critics, who ranked it among the highlights of Love & Life. A moderate commercial success, the song peaked at number 41 on the US Billboard Hot 100.

== Background ==
"Not Today" was written by Blige and rapper Eve along with Dr. Dre, Mike Elizondo, Theron Feemster, and Bruce Miller, while production was helmed by Dr. Dre. In a 2003 interview with MTV News, Blige elaborated on the track: "The first day Dre gave us the track, we went and laid it down in a studio. We didn't even know the song was going to make the album, because Dre was trying to do something else. We brought the song back and played it for him, and he was bugging out off the fact that we did it the same night. So a couple of weeks later he sends it back to us, mastered with Eve on it, killing it." She further commented on Eve's contribution: "She's just destroying somebody. I don't know who, but she sounds really pissed off. The good thing is she really murdered the track."

== Critical reception ==
Evan McGarey from The Michigan Daily described the song as a "big-budget [...] radio-ready anchor." He further wrote: "Fittingly, Dre’s plinking beats mold well with Mary J. Blige’s robust voice. It’s Eve, however, who steals the track. Instead of the subdued Eve we’ve seen in UPN sitcoms and Vin Diesel movies, we get a riled-up version who hurls fiery indictments to a former lover. It’s a shockingly welcome return to form." New York Post critic Dan Aquilante noted that "on "Not Today," Eve and Blige abuse a lying, cheating 'waste of time' boy who will never be a real man. Dre’s production surges with waves of orchestral power as Blige’s soul-flavored hip-hop cuts heads with Eve’s rap. From start to finish, it’s a terrific tune." Dotmusic's Sharon O'Connell called the a "sleek, TLC-tastic treat." New York Times critic Jessica Willis that "on "Not Today," she lets Eve run away with all of the put-downs, and they're crass and flat compared to the nuanced "Where I've Been," their duet from No More Drama." In his review of parent album Love & Life, Sal Cinquemani from Slant Magazine noted: "The flawless, sample-free “Not Today,” produced by Dr. Dre and featuring Eve, stands out here like a shiny penny on a dirty city street."

== Music video ==
A music video for "Not Today" was directed by Chris Robinson. According to MTV News, the "clip features a sexy Mary visiting a local social hot spot – the barbershop – and witnessing the flirtatious actions of a man who seems to be too distracted by several women to ever stick to just one. Eve and Mary watch the shenanigans amusedly." In addition, the visuals feature cameos from Barbershop 2: Back in Business co-stars Eve and Cedric the Entertainer as well as scenes from the film itself.

== Track listings ==
CD single
No.	Title	Writer(s)	Producer(s)	Length
1.	"Not Today" (radio edit featuring Eve)	Mary J. Blige; Eve Jeffers; Andre Young; Mike Elizondo; Theron Feemster; Bruce Miller	Dr. Dre	3:50
2.	"Ooh!" (G-Unit remix radio edit)	Blige; Sean Combs; Mechalie Jamison; Dimitri Christo; Hamilton Bohannon	Combs; D-Nat^{[a]}	3:48
3.	"Love @ 1st Sight" (Rishi Rich vocal remix featuring Juggy D)	Blige; Combs; Jamison; Mario Winans; Clifford Smith; Steven Jordan; Kamaal Fareed; Ali Jones-Muhammed; Malik Taylor	Combs; Winans; Stevie J; Rishi Rich^{[a]}	5:23

Notes

- ^{^[a]} denotes remix producer

Sample credits

- "Ooh!" contains a sample from "Singing a Song for My Mother", performed by Bohannon.
- "Love @ 1st Sight" contains a sample from "Hot Sex", performed by A Tribe Called Quest.

== Credits and personnel ==
Credits adapted from the liner notes of Love & Life.

- Mary J. Blige – vocals, vocal recording, writer
- Dr. Dre – mixing engineer, producer, writer
- Mike Elizondo – bass, keyboards, writer
- Theron Feemster – keyboards, writer
- Mauricio Iragorri – recording engineer
- Kendu Isaacs – vocal recording
- Eve Jefferse – vocals, writer
- Rouble Kapoor – recording assistance
- James McCrone – recording assistance
- Jason Merrit – recording assistance

== Charts ==
Weekly chart performance for "Not Today"
Chart (2003–2004)	Peak position
France (SNEP)	57
Scottish Singles Sales (Official Charts)	64
UK Singles (Official Charts)	40
UK Hip Hop/R&B (Official Charts)	12
US Billboard Hot 100	41
US Hot R&B/Hip-Hop Songs (Billboard)	21
US Pop Airplay (Billboard)	35
US Rhythmic Airplay (Billboard)	24

== Certifications ==
Video single certifications for "Not Today"
Region	Certification	Certified units/sales
United States (RIAA)	Platinum	50,000^{^}
^{^} Shipments figures based on certification alone.

== Release history ==
Release dates and formats for "Not Today"
Region	Date	Format(s)	Label(s)	Ref.
United States	November 24, 2003	Rhythmic contemporary radio; urban contemporary radio	Geffen	
United States	December 8, 2003	Contemporary hit radio	Geffen	
United States	January 20, 2004	DVD	Geffen	
