= Stolen Car =

A stolen car is a result from the act of a successful motor vehicle theft.

Stolen Car may refer to the title of one of several works of art:

== Film and TV ==
- "Stolen Car" (That '70s Show episode), 1999

== Music ==
- Stolen Car, a 2010 album by Certain General

=== Songs ===
- "Stolen Car" (Bruce Springsteen song), from the 1980 album The River
- "Stolen Car" (Beth Orton song), from the 1999 album Central Reservation
- "Stolen Car (Take Me Dancing)", a song by Sting from Sacred Love
- "Stolen Car" (Mylène Farmer song), a 2015 cover of the Sting song by French singer Mylène Farmer featuring the original recording artist

== See also ==
- "Stolen Cars", a 2021 song by Allday
