= The Best of Gary Numan 1978–1983 =

The Best of Gary Numan 1978-1983

Compilation album by Gary Numan / Tubeway Army
- Released: 20 September 1993
- Genre: New wave, electronic, synth-pop
- Length: 72:02 / 71:52
- Label: Beggars Banquet Records; BEGA 150 CD
- Producer: Gary Numan, Dramatis, Simon Heywood, Kenny Denton

Gary Numan / Tubeway Army chronology
Machine + Soul (1992)	The Best of Gary Numan 1978-1983 (1993)	Dream Corrosion (1994)

Singles from The Best of Gary Numan 1978-1983
- 1. "Cars ('93 Sprint)" Released: 4 July 1993

The Best of Gary Numan 1978–1983 is a double disc compilation album of Gary Numan's singles and selected album tracks released on the Beggars Banquet Records label. The album peaked at #70 on the UK Album Chart, and was promoted by a remixed re-release of Numan's 1979 hit "Cars" ('93 Sprint). Both the original version and the remixed version appear on the album.

The contents of the enclosed twelve-page booklet are identical to the one included with the previously released Exhibition compilation album from 1987. It contains various pictures from the years in question and an extensive chronological essay by Francis Drake.

== Track listing ==
CD1

1. "Cars" – 3:47
2. "We Are Glass" – 4:43
3. "Are 'Friends' Electric?" – 5:17
4. "My Love Is a Liquid" – 3:32
5. "Music For Chameleons" – 3:35
6. "Complex" – 3:09
7. "Me! I Disconnect From You" – 3:20
8. "Love Needs No Disguise" – 4:33
9. "Bombers" – 3:50
10. "The Joy Circuit" – 5:10
11. "We Are So Fragile" – 2:51
12. "Films" – 4:07
13. "Warriors" – 4:03
14. "That's Too Bad" – 3:18
15. "Everyday I Die" – 2:23
16. "On Broadway" – 4:29
17. "Please Push No More" – 5:39
18. "Down in the Park" [hidden track / piano version]

CD2

1. "Cars" ('93 Sprint) – 3:49
2. "We Take Mystery (To Bed)" – 3:37
3. "I Die: You Die" – 3:41
4. "Down in the Park" – 4:21
5. "She's Got Claws" – 4:54
6. "Stormtrooper in Drag" – 4:56
7. "My Shadow in Vain" – 2:58
8. "This Wreckage" – 5:22
9. "Sister Surprise" – 4:57
10. "M.E." – 5:34
11. "You Are in My Vision" – 3:11
12. "Metal" – 3:27
13. "I'm An Agent" – 4:18
14. "White Boys and Heroes" – 3:30
15. "The Life Machine" – 2:42
16. "My Centurion" – 5:18
17. "Remember I Was Vapour"

== Notes ==
- "Me! I Disconnect From You" is incorrectly credited as being produced by Kenny Denton (who actually produced the "Bombers" single).
- "Remember I Was Vapour" is incorrectly listed as "Remember, I Was Vapour".
