= After the Rain Has Fallen =

2000 single by Sting

Single by Sting

from the album Brand New Day
- Released: 10 April 2000
- Genre: Funk rock
- Length: 5:04
- Label: A&M
- Songwriter: Sting
- Producers: Sting; Kipper

Sting singles chronology
"Desert Rose" (2000)	"After the Rain Has Fallen" (2000)	"My Funny Friend and Me" (2000)

Music video
- "After the Rain Has Fallen" on YouTube

"After the Rain Has Fallen" is a song written and performed by English musician Sting, released as the third and final single from his sixth studio album, Brand New Day (1999), in April 2000. The song reached number 31 on the UK Singles Chart and peaked at number two on the US Billboard Triple-A chart.

== Release and reception ==
"After the Rain Has Fallen" was issued on A&M Records as a single, with the label number 497325-4. During the week of 15 April 2000, it was the highest entry to the UK Official Airplay Chart, where it climbed from No. 57 to No. 35. The following week, it debuted and peaked at No. 31 on the UK singles chart.

During the week of 11 August 2000, "After the Rain Has Fallen" was the second most added song to US adult album alternative radio stations. In October of that year, the song peaked at No. 2 on the US Billboard Adult Alternative Airplay chart.

Classic Rock Review called it the "most upbeat and most intense song thus far as a funk/rock arrangement with strong hook and more subtle use of synths," PopMatters critic Chris Massey wrote that "only the poppy polish of "After the Rain has Fallen" truly hints at what he's still capable of."

== Track listing ==
Enhanced CD

1. "After the Rain Has Fallen" (video edit) – 3:59
2. "Shape of My Heart" – 4:38
3. "After the Rain Has Fallen" (Tin Tin Out edit) – 4:15
4. "After the Rain Has Fallen" (music video)

== Charts ==
=== Weekly charts ===
Weekly chart performance for "After the Rain Has Fallen"
Chart (2000)	Peak position
Czech Republic (IFPI)	31
Europe (Eurochart Hot 100)	99
France (SNEP)	86
Germany (GfK)	64
Italy (FIMI)	16
Scottish Singles Sales (Official Charts)	31
UK Singles (Official Charts)	31
UK Airplay (Music Week)	27
US Adult Alternative Airplay (Billboard)	2
US Adult Pop Airplay (Billboard)	19

=== Year-end charts ===
2000 year-end chart performance for "After the Rain Has Fallen"
Chart (2000)	Position
US Triple-A (Billboard)	25

2001 year-end chart performance for "After the Rain Has Fallen"
Chart (2001)	Position
US Adult Top 40 (Billboard)	56

== Release history ==
Release dates and formats for "After the Rain Has Fallen"
Region	Date	Format(s)	Label(s)	Ref.
United Kingdom	10 April 2000	CD; cassette	A&M	
United States	8 August 2000	Triple-A radio	A&M	
United States	22 January 2001	Hot adult contemporary radio	A&M	
