= Send Your Love =

2003 single by Sting

Single by Sting featuring Vicente Amigo

from the album Sacred Love
- B-side: "Moon over Bourbon Street" (remix)
- Released: 30 July 2003
- Length: 4:38 (album version); 3:36 (radio edit)
- Label: A&M
- Songwriter: Sting
- Producers: Kipper; Sting

Sting singles chronology
"Rise & Fall" (2003)	"Send Your Love" (2003)	"Whenever I Say Your Name" (2003)

Music video
- "Send Your Love" on YouTube

"Send Your Love" is a song by English musician Sting, released as the lead single from his seventh studio album, Sacred Love (2003), on 30 July 2003. Written by Sting and co-produced by him and Kipper, "Send Your Love" features Spanish composer Vicente Amigo on the flamenco guitar. The song peaked at number 30 on the UK Singles Chart, entered the top 10 in Italy, and reached number one on the US Billboard Dance Club Play chart.

The B-side of the "Send Your Love" CD single is a remix of Sting's 1986 single "Moon over Bourbon Street" by Japanese producer Cornelius. "Send Your Love" was nominated for Best Male Pop Vocal Performance at the 46th Annual Grammy Awards, losing to Justin Timberlake's "Cry Me a River". Sting performed the song at the 2003 Billboard Music Awards before he accepted the Century Award, marking the first time that any of the award's recipients had performed at the ceremony.

== Release and promotion ==
"Send Your Love" was released as a CD single in Japan on 30 July 2003, in Australia on 8 September, and in the United Kingdom on 15 September. In the United States, it was serviced to hot adult contemporary and triple A radio on 18 August 2003. "Send Your Love" topped the Billboard Dance Club Play chart in a remixed form and peaked at number three on the Billboard Triple-A ranking.

In the UK, the song debuted and peaked at number 30 on the UK Singles Chart, giving Sting his 23rd top-40 hit; the song remained in the top 100 for two weeks. It entered the top 10 in Italy, where it peaked at number eight for two consecutive weeks. Elsewhere in Europe, the song charted within the top 20 in Hungary and the top 40 Germany and Switzerland. To promote the single, Sting made a music video for the song that premiered on the television channel VH1 on 18 August 2003.

== Track listings ==
UK and Australian CD single

1. "Send Your Love" – 3:36
2. "Moon over Bourbon Street" (Cornelius mix) – 3:32
3. "Send Your Love" (Dave Audé remix edit) – 3:16
4. "Send Your Love" (video CD-ROM)

Japanese CD single

1. "Send Your Love" (radio edit) – 3:38
2. "Moon over Bourbon Street" (Cornelius mix)
3. "Moon over Bourbon Street" (Cornelius mix instrumental)

== Personnel ==
Personnel are taken from the UK CD single.

- Sting – music, lyrics, production
- Vicente Amigo – flamenco guitar
- Kipper – production
- Victor Calderone – additional production
- Simon Osborne – recording, mixing

== Charts ==
=== Weekly charts ===
Chart (2003)	Peak position
Australia (ARIA)	44
Austria (Ö3 Austria Top 40)	43
Belgium (Ultratip Bubbling Under Flanders)	7
Belgium (Ultratip Bubbling Under Wallonia)	3
CIS Airplay (TopHit)	21
Germany (GfK)	24
Hungary (Rádiós Top 40)	13
Italy (FIMI)	8
Netherlands (Single Top 100)	43
Russia Airplay (TopHit)	22
Switzerland (Schweizer Hitparade)	37
UK Singles (OCC)	30
Ukraine Airplay (TopHit)	18
US Adult Alternative Airplay (Billboard)	3
US Adult Pop Airplay (Billboard)	29
US Dance Club Songs (Billboard) Remixes	1

=== Year-end charts ===
Chart (2003)	Position
CIS Airplay (TopHit)	35
Russia Airplay (TopHit)	31
Ukraine Airplay (TopHit)	27
US Adult Top 40 (Billboard)	93
US Dance Club Play (Billboard)	7
US Triple-A (Billboard)	26

== Release history ==
Region	Date	Format(s)	Label(s)	Ref.
Japan	30 July 2003	CD	A&M	
United States	18 August 2003	Hot adult contemporary; triple A radio	A&M	
Australia	8 September 2003	CD	A&M	
United Kingdom	15 September 2003	CD	A&M	
