= Whenever I Say Your Name =

Single by Sting and Mary J. Blige

from the album Sacred Love and Love & Life
- Released: November 10, 2003
- Genre: Pop; R&B
- Length: 5:25
- Label: A&M
- Songwriter: Sting
- Producers: Sting; Kipper

Sting singles chronology
"Send Your Love" (2003)	"Whenever I Say Your Name" (2004)	"Stolen Car (Take Me Dancing)" (2004)

Mary J. Blige singles chronology
"Ooh!" (2003)	"Whenever I Say Your Name" (2003)	"Not Today" (2003)

Music video
- "Whenever I Say Your Name" on YouTube

"Whenever I Say Your Name" is a duet recorded by English musician Sting and American singer Mary J. Blige, for Sting's seventh studio album Sacred Love (2003). It was written and produced by Sting, and co-produced by Mark "Kipper" Eldridge. Although not originally included on Blige's sixth studio album Love & Life (2003), the track was subsequently added to its international reissue.

"Whenever I Say Your Name" was released as the second single from Sacred Love, and the fourth single from Love & Life, on 8 December 2003, by A&M Records. It peaked at number 60 on the UK Singles Chart, marking Sting's lowest-peaking single since "They Dance Alone (Cueca Solo)" (1988), and Blige's lowest-peaking single ever. Despite its commercial underperformance, the song won Best Pop Collaboration with Vocals at the 46th Annual Grammy Awards (2004).

== Background ==
"Whenever I Say Your Name" was written and produced by Sting for his seventh studio album Sacred Love (2003). Production was helmed by Sting and Mark "Kipper" Eldridge. The singer felt inspired to work with Blige ever since they performed together on the 1997 MTV Video Music Awards. In 2003, he told LAUNCHcast: "I was totally blown away by her passionate, open singing [...] I had decided on that night that I'd love to write a song for her one day, and I came up with this idea of "Whenever I Say Your Name" – that's perfect for her, you know? It's very romantic. It also has a kind of religious component – you know, she's very churchy in the way she sings."

== Critical reception ==
Alan Light from The Los Angeles Times described "Whenever I Say Your Name" as "a knockout duet," while Entertainment Weekly's Tom Sinclair called it a "erotically charged duet" and further wrote: "[Sting] unites the secular and the sacred with the phrase "Whenever I say your name, I’m already praying"." Riff Magazine's Alexander Baechle found that "Blige oozes exuberance on "Whenever I Say Your Name." Both Blige and Sting take the opportunity to play to their strengths. Sting begins the tune with a characteristically moody, subtle verse. Imperceptibly, the song morphs into a borderline funk romp, pushing Blige’s power vocals to the fore."

== Music video ==
A music video for "Whenever I Say Your Name" was directed by frequent Sting collaborator Jim Gable.

== Track listings ==
All tracks written by Sting.

CD single
No.	Title	Producer(s)	Length
1.	"Whenever I Say Your Name" (radio version)	Sting; Kipper	4:03
2.	"Whenever I Say Your Name" (Will.I.Am remix featuring The Black Eyed Peas)	Sting; Kipper; will.i.am^{[a]}	4:03
3.	"Whenever I Say Your Name" (Salaam's Groove mix)	Sting; Kipper; Salaam Remi^{[a]}	4:48
4.	"Whenever I Say Your Name" (Billy Mann mix)	Sting; Kipper; Billy Mann^{[a]}; The Supaflyas^{[a]}	3:53

Notes

- ^{^[a]} denotes remix producer

== Credits and personnel ==
Credits adapted from the liner notes of Sacred Love.

- Mary J. Blige – vocals
- Kipper – producer
- Simon Osborn – engineer
- Sting – producer, vocals, writer

== Charts ==
Weekly chart performance for "Whenever I Say Your Name"
Chart (2003–2004)	Peak position
Belgium (Ultratip Bubbling Under Wallonia)	6
Netherlands (Single Top 100)	60
Switzerland (Schweizer Hitparade)	50
UK Singles (Official Charts)	60

== Release history ==
Release dates and formats for "Whenever I Say Your Name"
Region	Date	Format(s)	Label(s)	Ref.
United Kingdom	8 December 2003	CD	A&M; Polydor	
