= Desert Rose (Sting song) =

2000 single by Sting

Single by Sting featuring Cheb Mami

from the album Brand New Day
- Language: English, Algerian Arabic
- Released: 17 January 2000
- Studio: Il Palagio (Tuscany, Italy); Mega (Paris); Air Lyndhurst Hall (London)
- Genre: Worldbeat
- Length: 4:45 (album version); 3:55 (radio edit)
- Label: A&M
- Composer: Sting
- Lyricists: Gordon Sumner; Cheb Rabah (Rabah Zerradine)
- Producers: Sting; Kipper

Sting singles chronology
"Brand New Day" (1999)	"Desert Rose" (2000)	"After the Rain Has Fallen" (2000)

Cheb Mami singles chronology
"Au Pays Des Merveilles (Azwaw)" (1999)	"Desert Rose" (2000)	"Youm Wara Youm" (2002)

Music video
- "Desert Rose" on YouTube

"Desert Rose" is a song by British musician Sting featuring Algerian raï singer Cheb Mami, from Sting's sixth solo studio album, Brand New Day (1999). According to Sting, the lyrics have to do with "lost love and longing". Riding a wave of pre-9/11 interest in Latin and Arabic cultures, "Desert Rose" peaked at No. 2 in Canada, No. 3 in Switzerland, No. 4 in Italy, No. 15 in the United Kingdom, and No. 17 in the United States.

== Background ==
In 1998, Sting had listened to one of Cheb Mami's albums, which prompted him to see Mami perform live in Bercy with Khaled, Rachid Taha, and Steve Hillage. After his experience at the concert, Sting wrote the instrumentation to "Desert Rose", which later informed the direction of the lyrics. He then asked Mami to improvise some Arabic words over his melody. Mami returned with some lyrics in Arabic script for the song's raï descant, which he developed without knowing what Sting had written for the lyrics. Sting was unable to understand what Mami was singing, so he inquired about the lyrical content. Mami explained that his lyrics were about longing, which also aligned with the lyrics that Sting had created.

Sting said that the two sets of lyrics pertained to "the same subject, although not line for line." He further stated that the "I dream of rain/I dream of gardens in the desert sand" lyric related to romantic longing, lustful longing, and longing for a divine deity. Sting referred to the song as "an interesting experiment" and noted how the song "dovetails too, almost as if he sings something and I translate it." Dominic Miller, who played guitars on "Desert Rose", said that his contributions to the song amounted to a composite of layered guitar parts that were assembled and rearranged by various producers. He believed that his guitar overdubs were not central to "Desert Rose" and instead described the song as "production driven".

Upon the song's release as the second single from Brand New Day, radio programmers were initially hesitant to play "Desert Rose". A representative from A&M Records had previously been unsuccessful in lobbying Sting to remove the song's Arabic intro on the grounds that it might alienate American audiences. The car company Jaguar noticed that the music video for "Desert Rose" featured Sting in a Jaguar S-Type and offered to air portions of the music video in some of its commercials. Following an $18.5 million investment into these commercials, radio programmers began to play the song more frequently, which also bolstered the sales of its parent album.

Sting was initially reluctant to support the use of "Desert Rose" in the adverts as he feared that the Jaguar partnership would run contrary to his support for environmentalism. "Luckily, I had just planted 50,000 trees; I'm told that balances my carbon debt for any Jaguars I might have been responsible for selling." Sting told Saga magazine in 2002 that he was "happy and surprised that the song did so well. For starters, it begins in Arabic - and there aren't many pop songs in the Western world that do so." He also believed that the Arabic intro was a "calculated risk" and thought that its inclusion elicited further interest in the song.

== Critical reception ==
"Desert Rose" received moderate to positive reviews from music critics, who noted that the "exotic" song differed from the rest of the album and cited it as one of Brand New Day's highlights. Chris Willman from Entertainment Weekly referred to the song as "world-beat"; Sting took issue with the classification of Brand New Day as "world music", although he acknowledged the North African feel of "Desert Rose".

== Music video ==
The music video was directed by Paul Boyd in October 1999 and features Sting taking a trip through the Mojave Desert in a Jaguar S-Type driven by a masked female chauffeur while recording himself on a JVC GR-DVX4 video camera, and then going to a nightclub in Las Vegas to perform the song with Cheb Mami, a violinist and two DJs in front of a dancing crowd. Scenes also feature Sting walking alone in the desert holding the camera up and shots of the various patrons of the nightclub. It ends with a shot of Sting with his eyes shut (possibly asleep) in the back seat of the Jaguar, which is then seen driving off into the distance. After shooting the video, Sting's manager Miles Copeland III approached a music licensing maven, Lloyd Simon, to work with Jaguar on a collaboration, and the auto company featured the video in their prominent television advertisements during the year 2000.

== Remixes ==
Also included on the single releases were club remixes by Victor Calderone. One remixed version of the song was used in an alternative edit of the video, which included more sexually explicit footage. The song was later re-released on Sting's later album Duets.

== Track listings ==
UK CD1 (497 240-2)

1. "Desert Rose (radio edit)" – 3:55
2. "If You Love Somebody Set Them Free" (live at the Universal Amphitheatre, Los Angeles) – 4:27
3. "Fragile" (live at the Universal Amphitheatre, Los Angeles) – 4:10
4. "Desert Rose" video (CD-ROM)

UK CD2 (497 241-2)

1. "Desert Rose (Melodic Club Mix radio edit)" – 4:47
2. "Desert Rose (Melodic Club Mix)" – 9:21
3. "Desert Rose (Filter Dub Mix)" – 5:21
4. "Desert Rose (Melodic Club Mix)" video (CD-ROM)

UK 12-inch (497 241-1)

1. "Desert Rose (Melodic Club Mix)"
2. "Desert Rose (Filter Dub Mix)"
3. "Desert Rose" (original)

US CD (0694973212)

1. "Desert Rose (radio edit)" – 3:54
2. "Desert Rose (Melodic Club Mix radio edit)" – 4:44
3. "Brand New Day (Murlyn Extended Mix)" – 5:01
4. "Brand New Day (Murlyn Radio Mix)" – 3:54

Europe CD (497 233-2)

1. "Desert Rose (radio edit)" – 3:54
2. "Desert Rose (Melodic Club Mix)" – 9:20
3. "Desert Rose (Melodic Club Mix radio edit)" – 4:44
4. "Brand New Day (Murlyn Mix)" – 5:01
5. "Brand New Day" video (CD-ROM)

== Charts ==
=== Weekly charts ===
Weekly chart performance for "Desert Rose"
Chart (2000)	Peak position
Australia (ARIA)	67
Austria (Ö3 Austria Top 40)	6
Belgium (Ultratip Bubbling Under Flanders)	11
Belgium (Ultratop 50 Wallonia)	7
Canada (Nielsen SoundScan)	2
Canada Adult Contemporary (RPM)	23
Czech Republic (IFPI)	2
Estonia (Eesti Top 20)	3
Europe (Eurochart Hot 100)	3
France (SNEP)	6
Germany (GfK)	7
Greece (IFPI)	1
Hungary (Mahasz)	7
Ireland (IRMA)	27
Italy (FIMI)	4
Netherlands (Single Top 100)	29
Portugal (AFP)	1
Scottish Singles Sales (Official Charts)	19
Switzerland (Schweizer Hitparade)	3
UK Singles (Official Charts)	15
UK Airplay (Music Week)	37
US Billboard Hot 100	17
US Adult Alternative Airplay (Billboard)	1
US Adult Contemporary (Billboard)	22
US Adult Pop Airplay (Billboard)	3
US Dance Club Songs (Billboard)	5
US Dance Singles Sales (Billboard) Victor Calderone remix	1
US Pop Airplay (Billboard)	19

2025 weekly chart performance for "Desert Rose"
Chart (2025)	Peak position
Israel International Airplay (Media Forest)	17
Romania Airplay (TopHit)	86

=== Year-end charts ===
Year-end chart performance for "Desert Rose"
Chart (2000)	Position
Austria (Ö3 Austria Top 40)	27
Belgium (Ultratop 50 Wallonia)	33
Europe (Eurochart Hot 100)	19
France (SNEP)	27
Germany (Media Control)	32
Switzerland (Schweizer Hitparade)	17
US Billboard Hot 100	50
US Adult Contemporary (Billboard)	44
US Adult Top 40 (Billboard)	8
US Mainstream Top 40 (Billboard)	68
US Maxi-Singles Sales (Billboard)	2
US Triple-A (Billboard)	1

Chart (2001)	Position
US Adult Top 40 (Billboard)	54
US Maxi-Singles Sales (Billboard)	14

Chart (2002)	Position
Brazil (Crowley)	93
US Maxi-Singles Sales (Billboard)	22

Year-end chart performance for "Desert Rose" / "Brand New Day"
Chart (2001)	Position
Canada (Nielsen SoundScan)	36

Chart (2002)	Position
Canada (Nielsen SoundScan)	91

== Certifications ==
Region	Certification	Certified units/sales
United Kingdom (BPI) Sales since 2004	Silver	200,000^{‡}
^{‡} Sales+streaming figures based on certification alone.

== Release history ==
Release dates and formats for "Desert Rose"
Region	Date	Format(s)	Label(s)	Ref(s).
United Kingdom	17 January 2000	CD; cassette	A&M	
Japan	9 February 2000	CD	A&M	
United States	6 March 2000	Hot adult contemporary radio	A&M	
Japan	1 May 2000	CD	A&M	
United States	2 May 2000	Contemporary hit radio	A&M	
