= Brand New Day (Sting song) =

1999 single by Sting

Single by Sting

from the album Brand New Day
- Released: 13 September 1999
- Length: 6:19 (album version); 4:04 (radio edit)
- Label: A&M
- Songwriter: Sting
- Producers: Sting; Kipper

Sting singles chronology
"Roxanne '97" (1997)	"Brand New Day" (1999)	"Desert Rose" (2000)

Music video
- "Brand New Day" on YouTube

"Brand New Day" is a song by British musician Sting, the title track of his sixth studio album (1999). The song features Stevie Wonder on harmonica. It was released as a single on 13 September 1999, peaking at number 13 in the United Kingdom and reaching the top 40 on two Canadian charts. In the United States, it peaked at number three on the Billboard Bubbling Under Hot 100 and won a Grammy Award for Best Male Pop Vocal Performance in 2000.

== Background ==
Sting said that he wrote "Brand New Day" as "a kind of homage to Stevie [Wonder]", who also played harmonica on the song. Kipper, who co-produced Brand New Day with Sting, recalled that the song possessed a "Stevie Wonder vibe to it from day one" once the synth bass was added, which Kipper believed "suggested a Stevie Wonder chord sequence." According to Sting and Kipper, Wonder encountered some difficulties playing the song on his chromatic harmonica, saying that the song's key of B major was "a nightmare" for the instrument. After spending around 20 minutes getting acclimated to the key, Wonder completed a satisfactory part after two takes.

== Track listings ==
European maxi-CD single 1

1. "Brand New Day" (Edit) – 3:59
2. "Windmills of Your Mind" – 4:19
3. "End of the Game" – 6:36
4. "Brand New Day" – 6:20

European maxi-CD single 2

1. "Brand New Day" (Edit) – 3:59
2. "Fields of Gold" – 3:40
3. "Englishman in New York" – 4:25
4. "Let Your Soul Be Your Pilot" - 6:43

European CD single

1. "Brand New Day" (Edit) – 3:59
2. "Brand New Day" – 6:20

UK CD1

1. "Brand New Day" (Edit) – 3:59
2. "Windmills of Your Mind" – 4:19
3. "End of the Game" – 6:36

UK CD2

1. "Brand New Day" (Edit) – 3:59
2. "Fields of Gold" – 3:40
3. "Englishman in New York" – 4:25

== 2019 version ==
On 31 December 2018 (New Year's Eve), Sting freely released "Brand New Day 2019", a new version of the song, through his Facebook page. The song was first performed live in Times Square on the same day.

== Charts ==
=== Weekly charts ===
Chart (1999–2000)	Peak position
Australia (ARIA)	309
Austria (Ö3 Austria Top 40)	38
Canada Top Singles (RPM)	31
Canada Adult Contemporary (RPM)	27
Czech Republic (IFPI)	41
Estonia (Eesti Top 20)	3
Europe (Eurochart Hot 100)	31
Finland (Suomen virallinen lista)	2
Finland Airplay (Radiosoittolista)	1
France (SNEP)	73
Germany (GfK)	54
Iceland (Íslenski Listinn Topp 40)	26
Italy (Musica e dischi)	10
Italy Airplay (Music & Media)	2
Netherlands (Single Top 100)	46
New Zealand (Recorded Music NZ)	46
Scottish Singles Sales (Official Charts)	15
Switzerland (Schweizer Hitparade)	35
UK Singles (Official Charts)	13
UK Airplay (Music Week)	22
US Bubbling Under Hot 100 (Billboard)	3
US Adult Alternative Airplay (Billboard)	2
US Adult Pop Airplay (Billboard)	8

=== Year-end charts ===
Chart (1999)	Position
US Adult Top 40 (Billboard)	83
US Triple-A (Billboard)	28

Chart (2000)	Position
US Adult Top 40 (Billboard)	36
US Triple-A (Billboard)	20

== Release history ==
Region	Date	Format(s)	Label(s)	Ref.
United Kingdom	13 September 1999	CD; cassette	A&M	
United States	20 September 1999	Adult contemporary; hot adult contemporary radio	A&M	
Japan	22 September 1999	CD	A&M	
United States	16 November 1999	Contemporary hit radio	A&M	
