= Love @ 1st Sight =

Single by Mary J. Blige featuring Method Man

from the album Love & Life
- Released: June 20, 2003
- Recorded: November 6–10, 2002
- Genre: Hip hop; R&B
- Length: 5:03
- Label: Geffen
- Songwriters: Mary J. Blige; Sean Combs; Mario Winans; Mechalie Jamison; Clifford Smith; Steven Jordan; Kamaal Fareed; Ali Jones-Muhammed; Malik Taylor
- Producers: Sean Combs; Mario Winans; Stevie J

Mary J. Blige singles chronology
| "Come Close" (2002) | "Love @ 1st Sight" (2003) | "Ooh!" (2003) |

Method Man singles chronology
| "Round & Round" (remix) (2001) | "Love @ 1st Sight" (2003) | "What's Happenin'" (2004) |

"Love @ 1st Sight" is a song recorded by American singer Mary J. Blige for her sixth studio album Love & Life (2003). It features a guest appearance from rapper Method Man, and was written by Blige and Method Man themselves, as well as Sean Combs, Mario Winans, Stevie Jordan, and Mechalie Jamison; Combs, Winans and Jordan produced the track. The song is built around a sample of "Hot Sex" (1992) by American hip-hop trio A Tribe Called Quest. Due to the inclusion of the sample, several other writers are credited as songwriters. Lyrically, it features the protagonist persistently wondering about a romantic attraction for a stranger on the first sight.

"Love @ 1st Sight" was released as the lead single from Love & Life on June 20, 2003, by Geffen Records. A moderate commercial success, it reached number 22 on the US Billboard Hot 100 and number 10 on Hot R&B/Hip-Hop Singles & Tracks chart. In addition, the song charted within the top 20 in Italy and the United Kingdom, while reaching the majority on most other charts it appeared on. The radio edit of "Love @ 1st Sight" with intro was used for the accompanying music video, which was directed by Chris Robinson.

== Critical reception ==
PopMatters felt that "Love @ 1st Sight" was "a great representation that some of our ghetto superstars are growing up. Reminiscent of No More Drama's "Family Affair", "Love @ 1st Sight" is following in it's [sic] footsteps to the club dance floor with its playful tone and head-bobbing bass line." BET.com wrote of the song: "With a borrowed rap backdrop and a verse from Method Man, her old "You're All I Need to Get By" partner-in-crime, this song skillfully updated the pair's hip hop-soul heyday for the new millennium." Now called a "strong street track" as well as a "killer lead single."

Alexis Petridis, writing for The Guardian, remarked: "Over a tough, insistent groove, [Blige] ponders the mysteries of immediate physical attraction, while he sounds like the last person you would want to be immediately attracted to: "You find me just ’bout everywhere the poontang go"." New York Times editor Jessica Willis described "Love @ 1st Sight" as "a breezy bit of piffle with a solid pogo-ing beat, but the song has seemingly so little to do with Ms. Blige's actual life that she puts herself at risk of sounding like just another tawny, toned and wholesome girl hip-hop singer." Dallas Observer critic Walton Muyumba found that the song was a "cliché, but the sample helps push to the truth of her reaction."

== Music video ==
A music video for "Love @ 1st Sight" was directed by Chris Robinson, who also directed Blige in a music video-styled Lady Foot Locker commercial in which "Love @ 1st Sight" is played in the background. Filming took place in Hollywood on July 2, 2003. Method Man appears in it, while Sean "Diddy" Combs makes a special cameo appearance. An iPod is featured prominently at the beginning of video, an instance of paid-for product placement on the part of Apple Inc.

== Track listings ==
Australian CD single
| No. | Title | Length |
|---|---|---|
| 1. | "Love @ 1st Sight" (featuring Method Man) | 4:41 |
| 2. | "Love @ 1st Sight" (Rishi Rich Vocal Remix featuring Method Man) | 6:50 |
| 3. | "Your Child" (Kiyamma Griffin Uptempo Mix featuring Ghostface Killah) | 4:44 |
| 4. | "Love @ 1st Sight" (Music video) |

UK CD single
| No. | Title | Length |
|---|---|---|
| 1. | "Love @ 1st Sight" (Radio Edit With Intro featuring Method Man) | 4:41 |
| 2. | "Love @ 1st Sight" (Kurtis Mantronik's Rock Lobster Vocal Mix) | 6:50 |
| 3. | "Your Child" (Kiyamma Griffin Uptempo Mix featuring Ghostface Killah) | 4:44 |
| 4. | "Love @ 1st Sight" (Music video) |

US CD single
| No. | Title | Length |
|---|---|---|
| 1. | "Love @ 1st Sight" (Radio Edit With Intro featuring Method Man) | 4:33 |
| 2. | "Love @ 1st Sight" (Radio Edit) | 4:00 |

== Credits and personnel ==
Credits adapted from the Love & Life liner notes.

- Mary J. Blige – songwriting, vocals
- Sean Combs – producer, mixing
- Patrick Dillett – recording
- Emery Dobyns – mixing assistance
- Stevie J – producer
- Shannon Jones – background vocals
- Kandace Love – background vocals
- Lynn Montrose – mixing assistance
- Alexis Seton – recording assistance
- Franklin Socorro – recording
- Mario Winans – producer, instruments

== Charts ==
=== Weekly charts ===
Weekly chart performance for "Love @ 1st Sight"
| Chart (2003) | Peak position |
|---|---|
| Australia (ARIA) | 32 |
| Australian Urban (ARIA) | 11 |
| Belgium (Ultratip Bubbling Under Flanders) | 5 |
| Belgium (Ultratop 50 Wallonia) | 34 |
| Denmark (Tracklisten) | 15 |
| France (SNEP) | 49 |
| Germany (GfK) | 36 |
| Hungary (Dance Top 40) | 18 |
| Ireland (IRMA) | 34 |
| Italy (FIMI) | 16 |
| Netherlands (Dutch Top 40 Tipparade) | 6 |
| Netherlands (Single Top 100) | 56 |
| New Zealand (Recorded Music NZ) | 27 |
| Scottish Singles Sales (Official Charts) | 24 |
| Sweden (Sverigetopplistan) | 23 |
| Switzerland (Schweizer Hitparade) | 23 |
| UK Singles (Official Charts) | 18 |
| UK Hip Hop/R&B (Official Charts) | 8 |
| US Billboard Hot 100 | 22 |
| US Hot R&B/Hip-Hop Songs (Billboard) | 10 |
| US Rhythmic Airplay (Billboard) | 12 |

=== Year-end charts ===
Year-end chart performance for "Love @ 1st Sight"
| Chart (2003) | Position |
|---|---|
| UK Urban (Music Week) | 8 |
| US Hot R&B/Hip-Hop Songs (Billboard) | 69 |

== Release history ==
Release dates and formats for "Love @ 1st Sight"
| Region | Date | Format(s) | Label(s) | Ref. |
|---|---|---|---|---|
| United States | June 20, 2003 | Streaming | Geffen | |
| United States | July 7, 2003 | Rhythmic contemporary radio; urban contemporary radio | Geffen | |
| United States | July 22, 2003 | 12-inch vinyl | Geffen | |
| United States | August 5, 2003 | CD | Geffen | |
| Japan | August 20, 2003 | Maxi CD | Universal Music | |
| Germany | September 8, 2003 | Maxi CD | Universal Music | |
| France | September 9, 2003 | CD | Barclay | |
| Australia | September 15, 2003 | Maxi CD | Universal Music | |
| United Kingdom | September 15, 2003 | 12-inch vinyl; maxi CD | Polydor | |
