= Stolen Car (Take Me Dancing) =

2004 single by Sting

Single by Sting

from the album Sacred Love
- Released: 26 April 2004
- Recorded: 2003
- Genre: Pop
- Length: 3:55
- Label: A&M
- Songwriter: Sting
- Producers: Sting; Kipper

Sting singles chronology
"Whenever I Say Your Name" (2003)	"Stolen Car (Take Me Dancing)" (2004)	"Soul Cake" (2009)

Music video
- "Stolen Car (Take Me Dancing)" on YouTube

"Stolen Car (Take Me Dancing)" is a song by Sting, released as the third single from his album Sacred Love on 26 April 2004. It topped the Dance Club Songs chart in the United States in August 2004. A remix of the song featuring will.i.am of The Black Eyed Peas, titled: "Stolen Car (Take Me Dancing) (Batson-Doc-Will.I.Am Remix)", was released on 18 May 2004.

== Formats and track listings ==
European CD single

1. "Stolen Car (Take Me Dancing)" (Radio Version) – 3:44
2. "Stolen Car (Take Me Dancing)" (Batson-Doc-Will.I.Am Remix) – 4:08

European CD maxi single

1. "Stolen Car (Take Me Dancing)" (Radio Version) – 3:44
2. "Stolen Car (Take Me Dancing)" (Batson-Doc-Will.I.Am Remix) – 4:08
3. "Stolen Car (Take Me Dancing)" (B. Recluse Mix featuring Twista) – 3:06

US CD maxi single

1. "Stolen Car (Take Me Dancing)" (Radio Version) – 3:44
2. "Stolen Car (Take Me Dancing)" (Batson-Doc-Will.I.Am Remix) – 4:08
3. "Stolen Car (Take Me Dancing)" (B. Recluse Mix) – 3:06
4. "Stolen Car (Take Me Dancing)" (Radio Version) (The Video) – 3:46
5. "Stolen Car (Take Me Dancing)" (Batson-Doc-Will.I.Am Remix) (The Video) – 4:10
6. "Stolen Car (Take Me Dancing)" (B. Recluse Mix) (The Video) – 3:08

== Charts ==
=== Weekly charts ===
Chart (2004)	Peak position
European Hot 100 Singles (Billboard)	100
CIS Airplay (TopHit)	3
Germany (Official German Charts)	54
Hungary (Rádiós Top 40)	21
Hungary (Dance Top 40)	32
Italy (FIMI)	46
Russia Airplay (TopHit)	2
Scotland Singles (OCC)	80
Switzerland (Schweizer Hitparade)	81
UK Singles (OCC)	60
UK Airplay (Music Week)	21
US Adult Alternative Airplay (Billboard)	14
US Dance Club Songs (Billboard)	1

=== Year-end charts ===
Chart (2004)	Position
CIS (TopHit)	41
Russia Airplay (TopHit)	22

== Mylène Farmer and Sting version ==
"Stolen Car"

Single by Mylène Farmer and Sting

from the album Interstellaires
- Released: 28 August 2015 (digital download)
- Recorded: 2015
- Genre: Pop, electropop, variété française
- Length: 3:21
- Label: Stuffed Monkey, Polydor, Universal Music
- Songwriters: Lyrics: Sting & Mylène Farmer; Music: Sting
- Producer: The Avener

Mylène Farmer singles chronology
"Diabolique mon ange" (2013)	"Stolen Car" (2015)	"Insondables" (2015)

Music video
- "Mylène Farmer feat. Sting - Stolen Car (Clip Officiel)" on YouTube

"Stolen Car (Take Me Dancing)" was covered by French singer Mylène Farmer. She recorded it as a duet with Sting and added lyrics in French. The song was titled just "Stolen Car" and released as the first single from Farmer's album, Interstellaires (2015). It topped the charts in France, Belgium, and Wallonia and also reached number one on the Dance Club Songs in the United States. The song was also included in Sting's Duets compilation album (2021).

=== Track listing ===
Digital Download
No.	Title	Length
1.	"Stolen Car"	3:21

Remixes – EP
No.	Title	Length
1.	"Stolen Car" (Dave Audé Extended Mix)	6:34
2.	"Stolen Car" (Ralphi Rosario Mix)	7:48
3.	"Stolen Car" (My Digital Enemy Remix)	4:28
4.	"Stolen Car" (Mico C Extended Remix)	6:10
5.	"Stolen Car" (BRKLYN Remix)	4:14
6.	"Stolen Car" (Ralphi Rosario Massive Dub Mix)	7:02

Remixes 2 – EP
No.	Title	Length
1.	"Stolen Car" (Dave Audé Edit)	3:50
2.	"Stolen Car" (Ralphi Rosario Radio Edit)	3:49
3.	"Stolen Car" (Mico C Radio Remix)	3:43
4.	"Stolen Car" (BRKLYN Radio Remix)	3:16
5.	"Stolen Car" (Dave Audé Dub Mix)	5:32
6.	"Stolen Car" (Ralphi Rosario Vox Dub)	7:18

=== Charts ===
Chart (2015–16)	Peak position
Belgium (Ultratop 50 Wallonia)	1
France (SNEP)	1
Switzerland (Schweizer Hitparade)	55
Switzerland (Schweizer Hitparade Romandie)	4
US Dance Club Songs (Billboard)	1

=== Year-end charts ===
Chart (2016)	Position
US Dance Club Songs (Billboard)	24

== See also ==
- List of number-one dance singles of 2004 (U.S.)
- List of number-one dance singles of 2016 (U.S.)
