= Brand New Day (Sting album) =

Studio album by Sting
- Released: 27 September 1999
- Recorded: June 1998−June 1999
- Studios: Il Palagio, Italy; Studio Mega, Paris, France; Right Track, New York City; Avatar, New York City; AIR, London
- Genres: Pop rock; world
- Length: 48:49
- Labels: A&M; 0694-90443-2
- Producers: Sting, Kipper

Sting chronology
The Very Best of Sting & The Police (1997)	Brand New Day (1999)	...All This Time (2001)

Singles from Brand New Day
- 1. "Brand New Day" Released: 13 September 1999; 2. "Desert Rose" Released: 17 January 2000; 3. "After the Rain Has Fallen" Released: 10 April 2000

Brand New Day is the sixth solo studio album by English musician Sting, released by A&M Records on 27 September 1999. Promoted heavily by the success of the album's second single, "Desert Rose" (featuring popular Algerian Raï singer Cheb Mami), the album peaked at number nine on the Billboard 200 and sold over 3.5 million copies in the United States. Upon its release, Brand New Day was a critical and commercial success, and was hailed as a commercial comeback for Sting.

The album earned Sting a Grammy Award for Best Pop Vocal Album and his third Grammy Award for Best Male Pop Vocal Performance for the title track.

== Background ==
Originally, Sting's usual producer Hugh Padgham was to produce the album, but Sting decided to co-produce the album with Kipper, and Padgham was not required. The album was recorded in various studios around Europe.

The (6:36) full version of "The End of the Game" was included on the single for "Brand New Day" and the DTS and DVD-Audio releases of the album. The music video for the title track is a parody of bleach commercials, and advertises "Brand new 'Day Ultra'" brand. The song "Brand New Day" features Stevie Wonder on harmonica.

On September 27, 2024, an Expanded Edition was released as part of the 25th anniversary. The version contains remixes, live versions and the songs "Windmills of Your Mind" as well as a full length version of "The End of the Game".

== Track listing ==
All tracks are written by Sting, except where noted.

No.	Title	Writer(s)	Length
1.	"A Thousand Years"	Sting; Kipper	5:58
2.	"Desert Rose" (feat. Cheb Mami)	Sting; Cheb Rabah	4:45
3.	"Big Lie, Small World" (feat. David Hartley)		5:05
4.	"After the Rain Has Fallen"		5:03
5.	"Perfect Love...Gone Wrong" (feat. Sté Strausz)		5:24
6.	"Tomorrow We'll See" (feat. David Hartley)		4:47
7.	"Prelude to the End of the Game"		0:20
8.	"Fill Her Up" (feat. James Taylor)		5:39
9.	"Ghost Story"		5:29
10.	"Brand New Day"		6:19

Japanese edition (enhanced CD)
No.	Title	Writer(s)	Length
11.	"Windmills of Your Mind" (bonus track)	Michel Legrand; Alan Bergman; Marilyn Bergman	6:48
12.	"EPK" (video)		9:21

== Personnel ==
- Sting – lead vocals, backing vocals, bass guitar, Roland VG-8 guitar synthesizer
- Kipper – keyboards, drum programming
- Jason Rebello – acoustic piano, clavinet
- Don Blackman – Hammond organ
- David Hartley – Hammond organ, string arrangements and conductor (3, 6)
- Dominic Miller – guitars
- B. J. Cole – pedal steel guitar
- Vinnie Colaiuta – drums
- Manu Katché – drums
- Mino Cinelu – percussion
- Ettamri Mustapha – darbouka
- Branford Marsalis – clarinet
- Chris Botti – trumpet
- Kathryn Tickell – Northumbrian pipes, fiddle
- Stevie Wonder – harmonica (10)
- Farhat Bouallagui – string arrangements, conductor and leader (2)
- Isobel Griffiths – orchestral contractor (2, 3, 6)
- Gavyn Wright – string leader (3, 6)
- Moulay Ahmed – strings (2, 3, 6)
- Kouider Berkan – strings (2, 3, 6)
- Salem Bnouni – strings (2, 3, 6)
- Sameh Catalan – strings (2, 3, 6)
- Cheb Mami – vocals (2)
- Sté Strausz' – French rap (5)
- James Taylor – vocals (8)
- Tawatha Agee – backing vocals
- Dennis Collins – backing vocals
- Joe Mendes – backing vocals
- Janice Pendarvis – backing vocals, vocal contractor
- Pamela Quinlan – backing vocals
- Althea Rodgers – backing vocals
- Marlon Saunders – backing vocals
- Vaneese Thomas – backing vocals
- Darryl Tookes – backing vocals
- Ken Williams – backing vocals
- Gary Cook – Roland VG8 Programmer, Sound Creator

== Production ==
- Sting – producer
- Kipper – producer
- Neil Dorfsman – engineer
- Simon Osborne – engineer, mixing
- Geoff Foster – strings engineer (2, 3, 6)
- Etienne Colin – assistant engineer
- Nicholas Duport – assistant engineer
- Andrew Fellus – assistant engineer
- Brian Garten – assistant engineer
- Ricky Graham – assistant engineer
- Ben Kape – assistant engineer
- Stephanie Levy-B – assistant engineer
- Peter "Hopps" Lorimer – assistant engineer
- Aya Takemura – assistant engineer
- Chris Blair – mastering
- Abbey Road Studios (London, UK) – mastering location
- Joe Mama-Nitzberg – art direction
- Jodi Peckman – art direction
- Richard Frankel – package design
- Olaf Heine – photography
- Carter Smith – photography

Professional ratings
Review scores
Source	Rating
AllMusic	3.5/5 stars
Chicago Tribune	(Not rated)
Entertainment Weekly	(B−)
Los Angeles Times	3.5/4 stars
The New York Times	Mixed
Rolling Stone	3/5 stars

== Accolades ==
=== Grammy Awards ===
Year	Nominee / work	Award	Result
2000	Brand New Day	Best Pop Vocal Album	Won
2000	Brand New Day	Best Male Pop Vocal Performance	Won

== Charts ==
=== Weekly charts ===
Chart (1999–2000)	Peak position
Australian Albums (ARIA)	21
Austrian Albums (Ö3 Austria)	1
Belgian Albums (Ultratop Flanders)	11
Belgian Albums (Ultratop Wallonia)	4
Canadian Albums (Billboard)	12
Danish Albums (Hitlisten)	7
Dutch Albums (Album Top 100)	7
Estonian Albums (Eesti Top 10)	3
European Albums (Music & Media)	1
Finnish Albums (Suomen virallinen lista)	1
French Albums (SNEP)	3
German Albums (Offizielle Top 100)	1
Greek Albums (IFPI)	2
Hungarian Albums (MAHASZ)	2
Irish Albums (IRMA)	42
Italian Albums (FIMI)	3
Japanese Albums (Oricon)	7
New Zealand Albums (RMNZ)	16
Norwegian Albums (VG-lista)	1
Portuguese Albums (AFP)	1
Scottish Albums (Official Charts)	9
Spanish Albums (PROMUSICAE)	5
Swedish Albums (Sverigetopplistan)	4
Swiss Albums (Schweizer Hitparade)	4
UK Albums (Official Charts)	5
US Billboard 200	9

=== Year-end charts ===
Chart (1999)	Position
Belgian Albums (Ultratop Wallonia)	56
Dutch Albums (Album Top 100)	83
French Albums (SNEP)	32
German Albums (Offizielle Top 100)	46
Japanese Albums (Oricon)	188
UK Albums (OCC)	150
US Billboard 200	199
Chart (2000)	Position
Austrian Albums (Ö3 Austria)	32
Belgian Albums (Ultratop Wallonia)	74
Canadian Albums (Nielsen SoundScan)	38
European Albums (Music & Media)	16
German Albums (Offizielle Top 100)	28
Italian Albums (FIMI)	23
Swiss Albums (Schweizer Hitparade)	55
UK Albums (OCC)	55
US Billboard 200	28

== Certifications and sales ==
Region	Certification	Certified units/sales
Argentina (CAPIF)	Gold	30,000^{^}
Australia (ARIA)	Platinum	70,000^{^}
Austria (IFPI Austria)	Gold	25,000^{*}
Belgium (BRMA)	Gold	25,000^{*}
Brazil (Pro-Música Brasil) (Expanded Edition)	Platinum	40,000^{‡}
Canada (Music Canada)	2× Platinum	262,000
France (SNEP)	2× Gold	200,000^{*}
Germany (BVMI)	Platinum	300,000^{^}
Hungary (MAHASZ)	Gold	
Italy (FIMI)	3× Platinum	300,000^{*}
Japan (RIAJ)	Platinum	105,480
Netherlands (NVPI)	Gold	50,000^{^}
New Zealand (RMNZ)	Platinum	15,000^{^}
Norway (IFPI Norway)	Gold	25,000^{*}
Poland (ZPAV)	Platinum	100,000^{*}
Spain (Promusicae)	Gold	50,000^{^}
Switzerland (IFPI Switzerland)	Platinum	50,000^{^}
United Kingdom (BPI)	Platinum	420,000
United States (RIAA)	3× Platinum	3,500,000
Summaries
Europe (IFPI)	2× Platinum	2,000,000^{*}
Worldwide	—	7,000,000
^{*} Sales figures based on certification alone.^{^} Shipments figures based on certification alone.^{‡} Sales+streaming figures based on certification alone.
