= Machine and Soul =

Machine + Soul

Studio album by Gary Numan
- Released: 3 August 1992
- Recorded: Late 1991 – Mid 1992
- Studio: Outland Studio
- Genre: Pop-funk
- Length: 47:09
- Label: Numa
- Producer: Kipper

Gary Numan chronology
Outland (1991)	Machine + Soul (1992)	Sacrifice (1994)

Alternative cover
- 1998 reissue cover

Singles from Machine + Soul
- 1. "Emotion" Released: September 1991; 2. "The Skin Game" Released: March 1992; 3. "Machine + Soul" Released: July 1992

Professional ratings
Review scores
Source	Rating
AllMusic	1.5/5 stars

Machine + Soul is the eleventh solo studio album by the English musician Gary Numan, released in 1992. It was a low point, released primarily to help pay off debt, and was the last of his efforts to make his music more radio-friendly. His subsequent work went in the much darker and more industrial direction that would revive his career.

Numan's two previous studio albums, 1988's Metal Rhythm and 1991's Outland, had been released through IRS Records. However, Numan's relationship with that label had become strained, leading to his quitting IRS and reactivating his own label, Numa Records, on which he had released his work from 1984 until 1986. He continued to release albums on that label, before closing it down permanently after Sacrifice (1994).

== Overview ==
Musically, Machine + Soul continued the synth-rock/funk style of Metal Rhythm and Outland; in fact, the two Prince covers, "U Got the Look" and "1999" (the latter of which was relegated to B-side status), were recorded during the Outland sessions and at one point were set for inclusion on that album. Like Outland, Machine + Soul features movie vocal samples (for example, a line from Willy Wonka & the Chocolate Factory can be heard at the beginning of the album). However, Numan strove for a much more commercial sound with Machine + Soul, influenced by the work of Jimmy Jam and Terry Lewis as well as by Prince. A decade after Machine + Soul's release, Numan had little difficulty describing his feelings for the album:

I convinced myself [that Machine + Soul] was all right, that it was a 'clever' mix of funk, pop, rock and electronics. I almost convinced myself that I liked it. Not long after it was released though, I had to admit, only to myself for a while, that it was not what I'd hoped. There was nothing wrong with it as such, it just doesn't have much of me on it - not playing-wise, but emotionally. It is the most 'non-Numan' Numan album I've ever made, for my style, sound and character are completely missing. Whatever people think about my music, it's always been very personal. So, at a time when I was experiencing extreme lows in my career and private life, the last thing I felt like making was a shiny, polished pop record. But that's what I'd done.

Numan stated that reflecting on the album and its reception almost convinced him to retire from the music industry altogether.

I put out a really shit album in 1992 called Machine + Soul which I’ll regret for the rest of my life. I realised that what I’d been doing wasn’t the right way to do it. I took a bit of time out and really thought through everything. Even whether I wanted to leave the music business.

Numan later said that in 1993, "Nothing was right...That music, those clothes, that haircut. Imagine falling off a ship in the ocean, knowing if you stop swimming you're finished. That's what I was doing then. I was trying not to die."

Machine + Soul peaked at No. 42 on the UK Albums Chart. Three singles were released from the album: "Emotion", which did not chart; "The Skin Game", which peaked at No. 68; and the title track, which peaked at No. 72.

Over a year after the album's release, Numan embarked on the 14-date "Dream Corrosion Tour" of October–November 1993, from which the live album Dream Corrosion was released. Recorded at the Hammersmith Apollo, London on 6 November 1993, and released in August 1994, Dream Corrosion reached only #86 on the UK Album charts, however, it has been cited as the template with which Numan relaunched his career, preparing him for his return-to-form studio album Sacrifice in 1994. With Sacrifice, Numan dispensed with the dance rhythms and female backing vocals, in favour of a back-to-basics approach, more introspective lyrics, and a darker musical sound.

Three songs from Machine + Soul (the title track, "Emotion" and "U Got the Look") were included on the 1996 remix album, Techno Army featuring Gary Numan.

Machine + Soul was reissued in 1998 in the US and 1999 in the UK. The album's original sleeve was discarded for both releases. Both editions featured entirely new covers, utilizing photographs from Numan's Metal Rhythm era.

== Track listing ==
All tracks are written by Gary Numan except where noted.

All timings are approximate and will vary slightly with different equipment.

=== 1992 Numa CD release (NUMACD 1009) ===
No.	Title	Writer(s)	Length
1.	"Machine + Soul"		5:57
2.	"Generator"	Numan, Kipper	6:08
3.	"The Skin Game"		6:23
4.	"Poison"		5:02
5.	"I Wonder"		4:28
6.	"Emotion"		5:31
7.	"Cry"		4:45
8.	"U Got the Look"	Prince	3:57
9.	"Love Isolation"		4:38

=== 1993 Numa 'Extended' CD release (NUMACDX 1009) ===
No.	Title	Writer(s)	Length
1.	"Machine + Soul (titled 'Mix 3' on the "Machine + Soul" CD single)"		7:33
2.	"Generator"	Numan, Kipper	9:51
3.	"The Skin Game (titled 'Lycra Mix' on "The Skin Game" 12" single)"		7:41
4.	"Poison"		6:39
5.	"I Wonder"		6:33
6.	"Emotion"		8:00
7.	"Cry"		7:31
8.	"U Got the Look"	Prince	3:57
9.	"Love Isolation"		6:30
10.	"Dark Mountain"		3:57
11.	"The Hauntings"		4:06
12.	"In a Glasshouse"		4:12
13.	"Hanoi"		2:03

=== 1999 Cleopatra U.S. CD reissue (CLP 0541-2) ===
No.	Title	Writer(s)	Length
1.	"Machine + Soul"		5:57
2.	"Generator"	Numan, Kipper	6:08
3.	"The Skin Game"		6:23
4.	"Poison"		5:02
5.	"I Wonder"		4:28
6.	"Emotion"		5:31
7.	"Cry"		4:45
8.	"U Got the Look"	Prince	3:57
9.	"Love Isolation"		4:38
10.	"Hanoi"		2:03
11.	"In a Glasshouse"		4:12
12.	"Wonder Eye"		4:04
13.	"Cry Baby"		4:21
14.	"The Hauntings"		4:06
15.	"1999"	Prince	4:56
16.	"Dark Mountain"		3:09

=== 1999 Eagle Records UK CD reissue (EAMCD075) ===
No.	Title	Writer(s)	Length
1.	"Machine + Soul"		5:57
2.	"Generator"	Numan, Kipper	6:08
3.	"The Skin Game"		6:23
4.	"Poison"		5:02
5.	"I Wonder"		4:28
6.	"Emotion"		5:31
7.	"Cry"		4:45
8.	"U Got the Look"	Prince	3:57
9.	"Love Isolation"		4:38
10.	"Hanoi"		2:03
11.	"Dark Mountain"		3:09
12.	"The Hauntings"		4:06
13.	"1999"	Prince	4:56
14.	"Cry Baby"		4:21
15.	"Wonder Eye"		4:04

== Notes ==
- "Wonder Eye" and "Cry Baby" are demo versions of "I Wonder" and "Cry", respectively.
- Some pressings of both the Numa CD releases (those that state on the inner rim 'Made in the UK by PDO') suffered from CD rot.
- Initial pressings of the Numa 'Extended' release omitted the four bonus tracks, despite their titles being listed on the inserts and CD. This pressing was soon withdrawn.

== Personnel ==
- Gary Numan – vocals, keyboards, guitar
- Kipper – guitars, keyboards on tracks 1, 2, 4, 5, 6, 9
- Mike Smith – keyboards on tracks 1, 3, 6, 7, 8
- Keith Beauvais – guitars on tracks 3, 7, 8
- Ade Orange – keyboards on track 3
- Susie Webb – backing vocals on tracks 1, 2, 4, 5, 6, 9
- Zoe Nicholas – backing vocals on tracks 1, 2, 4, 5, 6, 9
- Jackie Rawe – backing vocals on tracks 3, 7
- Cathy Odgen – backing vocals on track 8
