= No More Drama =

2001 studio album by Mary J. Blige

Studio album by Mary J. Blige
- Released: August 18, 2001
- Studios: Enterprise (Burbank, California); Studio A (Dearborn Heights, Michigan); Flyte Tyme (Edina, Minnesota); Cue (Falls Church, Virginia); Record One, Record Plant (Los Angeles); The Hit Factory, Mixed Impressions, Quad, Right Track Recording, Roxie Records, Sony Music Studios (New York City); East Coast Flavor (Washington, D.C.)
- Genres: R&B; hip-hop soul
- Length: 72:46
- Label: MCA
- Producers: Mary J. Blige; Ron Lawrence; Charlemagne; Dr. Dre; Missy Elliott; Kenny Flav; Irv Gotti; Dame Grease; Kiyamma Griffin; Rich Harrison; Gerald Isaac; Jimmy Jam & Terry Lewis; K-1 Million; The Neptunes; Bryan Peguero; Rockwilder; Swizz Beatz; Chucky Thompson; Mario Winans

Mary J. Blige chronology
Mary (1999)	No More Drama (2001)	Love & Life (2003)

Singles from No More Drama
- 1. "Family Affair" Released: July 24, 2001; 2. "No More Drama" Released: October 30, 2001; 3. "Dance for Me" Released: January 28, 2002

Reissue

Singles from the reissue of No More Drama
- 1. "Rainy Dayz" Released: March 11, 2002

No More Drama is the fifth studio album by American singer Mary J. Blige. It was released on August 18, 2001, by MCA Records.

Following the critical and commercial success of her fourth studio album, Mary (1999), No More Drama was similarly well received. It debuted at number two on the US Billboard 200 and at number one on the R&B Albums chart, selling 294,000 copies in its first week. It has spawned four singles that have attained Billboard chart success, including its lead single "Family Affair", which became Blige's first career number-one single on the US Billboard Hot 100 chart and a worldwide number-one hit.

The album received two Grammy Award nominations for Best R&B Album and Best Female R&B Vocal Performance (for "Family Affair") at the 44th Grammy Awards. Blige would win her first in the latter category for the track "He Think I Don't Know" the following year. As of December 2016, the album has been certified triple platinum for shipping more than three million copies in the US by the Recording Industry Association of America (RIAA).

== Conception ==
The inspiration for No More Drama came largely from Blige's own confused and hectic life. In a later interview she confessed to living a life of alcohol and drug abuse at the time, and as a result getting involved in a series of abusive relationships. The album was an attempt to break free from this vicious circle, which was a result of a deprived childhood.

Stylistically, the album diverged from the blues-soaked R&B of Mary into her earlier 1990s hip-hop beats. This is especially evident in the first single, "Family Affair". Rapper Eve appears on the track "Where I've Been" as well, and urban influences can be heard throughout the album.

Early in its development, the album carried the full title Mary Jane: No More Drama and was to be a sequel to 1999's Mary. Blige's then-manager hinted that the album would be the second in a trilogy and be followed by an album titled Mary Jane Blige. During this time, the first single was supposed to be a song called "Rock Steady" featuring a rap from Jay-Z and Lenny Kravitz on guitar. The song was leaked to mixtapes around June 2001, two months before the album was scheduled to be released and subsequently did not make the final cut on the album.

The original advance copy of No More Drama was slightly different from the later, official release. A vocal loop repeated throughout the whole of the version included with the intention of anti-piracy sings "Mary J. Blige, No More Drama!". The first publish of an AMG review printed in All Music Guide to Soul, a guide to R&B and soul, of No More Drama mistakenly pointed this out as if it were part of the actual album, calling it "as subtle and congruent as a consistent drum hit".

== Critical reception ==
Professional ratings
Aggregate scores
Source	Rating
Metacritic	77/100
Review scores
Source	Rating
AllMusic	4/5 stars
Entertainment Weekly	A
The Guardian	4/5 stars
Los Angeles Times	3/4 stars
NME	3.5/5 stars
Q	4/5 stars
Rolling Stone	3.5/5 stars
Uncut	3.5/5 stars
USA Today	3.5/4 stars
Vibe	4/5

No More Drama received generally positive reviews from critics. At Metacritic, which assigns a normalized rating out of 100 to reviews from mainstream publications, the album received an average score of 77, based on 12 reviews. AllMusic editor Liana Jonas complimented Blige's ability to write relatable lyrics, writing that she "has a killer instinct for creating gritty, thick, and soul-infused R&B fare. Her music is more than heard. It is felt, and audiences would be hard-pressed to not surrender to her groove." Writing for The A.V. Club, Nathan Rabin believed "Blige sounds happier and more relaxed than ever. Boasting nearly as many producers as songs, No More Drama [is] a testament to Blige's force of personality and the authenticity of her vision that the disc feels as personal and intimate as the most heartfelt four-track demo." Entertainment Weekly's David Browne felt that "from the Dre-produced theatricality of the single ”Family Affair” to refined funk and crisp quiet-storm R&B, the multi-producer arrangements are expansive yet warm, and Blige's pushy rasp has never sounded better."

Robert Marriott from Rolling Stone said the record "presents Blige more in touch with her roots, more grounded and ready for her next set of challenges, musical and otherwise, an analog soul thriving in a digital age." Barry Walters from The Village Voice called it "Blige's most rhythm album ever, and even the ballads that can drag r&b down here bristle with bumping beats." The newspaper's Robert Christgau was somewhat less enthusiastic, finding the record "front-loaded", highlighting the songs "PMS" and "Steal Away" while writing "positive attitude's a bitch, not to mention a drag." The Los Angeles Times felt that while No More Drama was "not as innovative as her early recordings," it "seamlessly incorporates the smoother soul and gospel flavors of 1999’s Mary with her trademark blend of hip-hop, funk and R&B." Ethan Brown was unimpressed by Blige's more optimistic songs, writing in New York magazine that, "miserable, Blige can be penetrating and profound; happy, she comes off generic and bland."

== Commercial performance ==
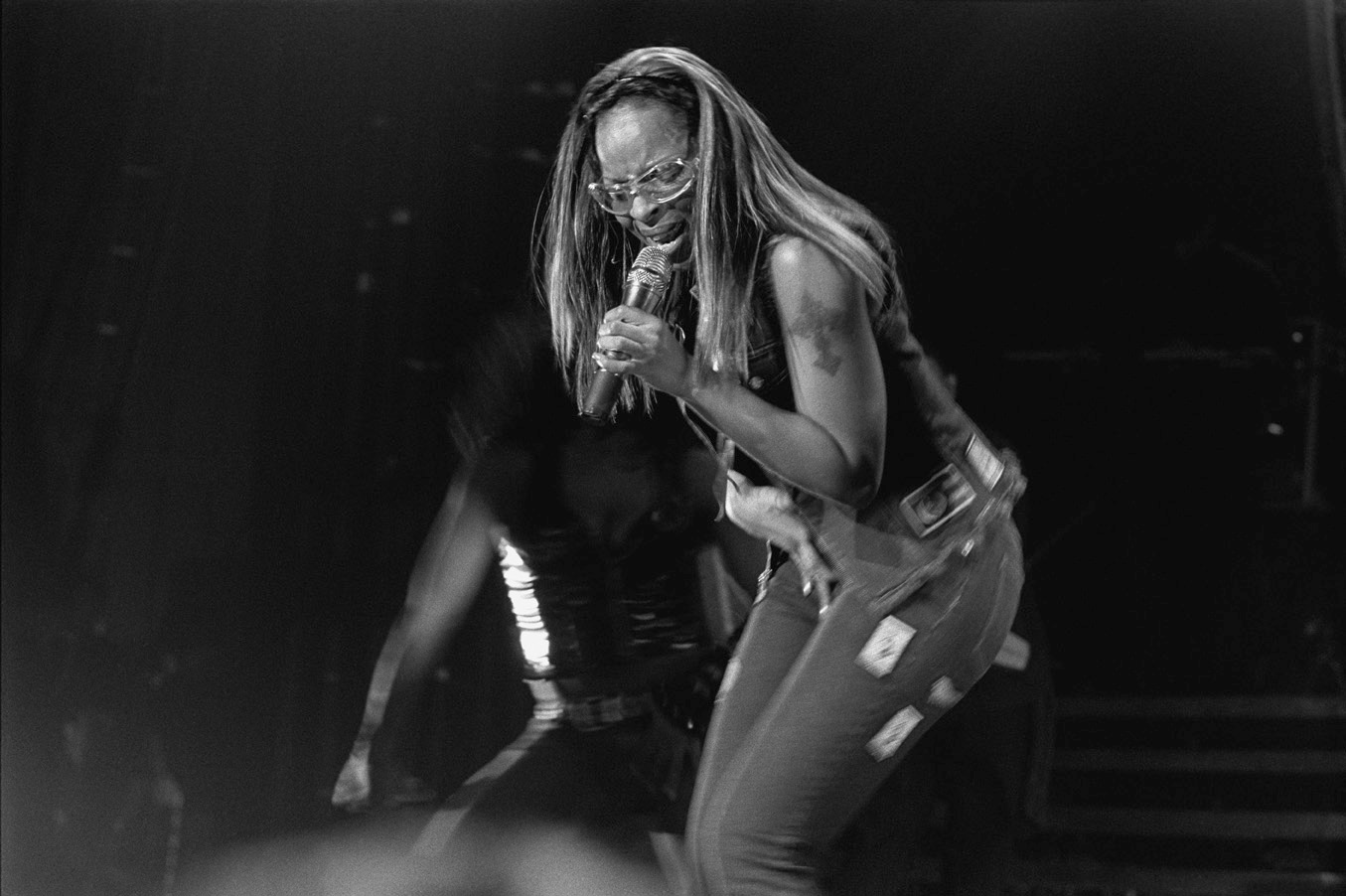
In the United States, No More Drama opened to Blige's biggest first week sales up to then.

No More Drama debuted and peaked at number two on the Billboard 200, the official albums chart in the United States, on September 6, 2001 – second only to Aaliyah's self-titled third album. The album sold 294,351 units in its first week of release. No More Drama was Blige's highest debut week album sales, until it was surpassed by The Breakthrough (2005), which sold 729,000 copies in its first week. By the end of 2001, the album was certified platinum by the Recording Industry Association of America (RIAA), and became the seventy-third best-selling album of that year in the United States. The album's commercial performance was reinforced by the subsequent release of a reissue. The release of the special edition helped No More Drama to re-enter the top ten in February 2002, gaining more than 200 percent in sales at a total of 61,000 copies. The same month, No More Drama was certified double platinum by the RIAA. By December 2009, the standard edition of the album has sold 1.9 million units in the US, while the re-issued special edition sold an additional 1.2 million copies; bringing its total sales to 3.1 million copies sold.

Internationally, No More Drama became Blige's highest-charting album yet. In Sweden, the album debuted and peaked at number two on the Swedish Albums Chart. In fall 2001, it was certified Gold by the Swedish Recording Industry Association. In the United Kingdom, No More Drama debuted at number 21 in the week of September 8, 2001. It eventually peaked at number four in its 38th week on the chart and on March 8, 2002, was certified Platinum by the British Phonographic Industry (BPI). By 2021, the album had sold 578,500 in the United Kingdom. In Canada, No More Drama marked Blige's third consecutive top five album. It reached double Platinum status on April 30, 2002. In Germany, the album became Blige's first top 20 entry, reaching number 13 and staying in the German Albums Chart for 35 weeks. In 2023, it was certified Gold by the Bundesverband Musikindustrie (BVMI). In France, the album marked Blige's first top ten album, peaking at number eight on the French Albums Chart. In November 2001, the Syndicat national de l'édition phonographique (SNEP) awarded it a Gold certification. No More Drama further earned Gold certifications in Japan, the Netherlands, and South Africa. Estimated worldwide sales for the album are at 6,500,000 units.

== Accolades and impact ==
No More Drama and its singles earned Blige numerous awards and nominations. At the 44th Annual Grammy Awards, the album became her fourth consecutive project to be nominated for Best R&B Album, though it lost to Alicia Keys's Songs in A Minor (2001). Meanwhile, the album's lead single, "Family Affair", received a nomination for Best Female R&B Vocal Performance, also losing to "Fallin'" (2001) by Keys. Album cut "He Think I Don't Know," recorded for the 2002 reissue of No More Drama, eventually won Blige her first Grammy as a solo performer in the Best Female R&B Vocal Performance category at the 45th Annual Grammy Awards. The album also was nominated for Best R&B/Soul Album – Female at both the 2003 Lady of Soul Awards and the 2003 Soul Train Music Awards, each losing to Ashanti's same-titled debut album (2002).

While her previous albums What's the 411? (1992), My Life (1994), Share My World (1997), and Mary (1999) each had enjoyed success varying degrees in foreign music markets, No More Drama marked Blige's commercial breakthrough on an international scale. Boosted by the worldwide top-10 success of its lead single "Family Affair", it debuted to her highest peaks in a number of countries and became her first album to reach Gold or Platinum status in several nations, resulting in Blige's first world tour, the No More Drama Tour, and promotional dates outside of the United States. In a 2006 interview with Oprah Winfrey, the singer stated: "After my first album, What's the 411?, I didn't even know I was successful. It wasn't until No More Drama in 2001 that I knew I had made it."

== Track listing ==
No More Drama
No.	Title	Writer(s)	Producer(s)	Length
1.	"Love"	Mary J. Blige; Bruce Miller; Ron Lawrence; Kwame Holland	Ron "Amen-Ra" Lawrence; K-1 Million	2:46
2.	"Family Affair"	Blige; B. Miller; Andre Young; Camara Kambon; Mike Elizondo	Dr. Dre	4:28
3.	"Steal Away" (featuring Pharrell Williams and Malice)	Blige; Chad Hugo; Pharrell Williams	The Neptunes	4:27
4.	"Crazy Games"	Blige; Kenny Dickerson	Kenny Flav	3:23
5.	"PMS"	Blige; Terri Robinson; Tara Tillman; Chucky Thompson; Al Green	Thompson	5:33
6.	"No More Drama"	James Harris III; Terry Lewis; Barry De Vorzon; Perry Botkin Jr.	Jimmy Jam and Terry Lewis	5:26
7.	"Keep It Moving"	Blige; B. Miller	Rockwilder	4:15
8.	"Destiny"	Blige; Bryan Reeves; Bennie Benjamin; Sol Marcus; Gloria Caldwell	Kiyamma Griffin; Bryan Peguero	4:14
9.	"Where I've Been" (featuring Eve)	Blige; Kasseem Dean; Eve Jeffers	Swizz Beatz	5:11
10.	"Beautiful Day"	B. Miller	Kenny Flav	3:33
11.	"Dance for Me"	B. Miller; Blige; Ahkim Miller; Sting	Dame Grease	4:47
12.	"Flying Away"	Blige; Brenda Russell	Griffin	5:00
13.	"Never Been"	Missy Elliott; Henri Charlemagne; Gene McFadden; John Whitehead; Jerry Cohen	Missy Elliott; Charlemagne	4:03
14.	"2U"	Blige	Griffin	4:45
15.	"In the Meantime"	Blige; Robinson	Harrison	4:14
16.	"Forever No More" (poem)	Blige		1:41
17.	"Testimony"	Blige; Dickerson; Michelle Bell	Kenny Flav	5:00
Total length:				72:46

UK edition
No.	Title	Writer(s)	Producer(s)	Length
18.	"Checkin' for Me"	Cecil Ward; Thompson	Thompson	3:06
Total length:				75:52

Japanese edition
No.	Title	Writer(s)	Producer(s)	Length
18.	"Girl from Yesterday"	Ward; Thompson	Thompson	4:41
Total length:				77:27

Reissue
No.	Title	Writer(s)	Producer(s)	Length
4.	"He Think I Don't Know"	Gerald Isaac	Isaac	5:37
7.	"Rainy Dayz" (featuring Ja Rule)	Jeffrey Atkins; Irving Lorenzo	Irv Gotti	4:36
10.	"Dance for Me" (featuring Common)	B. Miller; Blige; Lonnie Lynn; Sting	Dame Grease	3:25
11.	"No More Drama" (remix featuring P. Diddy)	Harris; Lewis; De Vorzon; Botkin; Sean Combs; Mario Winans	Combs; Winans	4:05
Total length:				72:31

=== Notes ===
- The reissue excludes "Crazy Games", "Keep It Moving", and "Destiny". "PMS" and "Where I've Been" appear in edited versions, while the original version of "Dance for Me" is replaced by the single version featuring Common. The remainder of the original track listing remains unaltered.
- International reissue pressings, excluding Japan and the UK, include the Plutonium mix of "Dance for Me".
- UK reissue pressings include "Girl from Yesterday". Japanese reissue pressings additionally include "Checkin' for Me".
- Japanese special tour edition pressings use the same track listing as the reissue's North American edition, with the addition of the music video for the Plutonium mix of "Dance for Me". The edition further includes a bonus disc containing C-Swing, Sun Ship, and G-Club remixes of "Dance for Me", alongside "Checkin' for Me", "Girl from Yesterday", and "Keep It Moving".

Sample credits

- "PMS" contains a sample of "Simply Beautiful" by Al Green.
- "No More Drama" embodies portions of "Nadia's Theme" by Barry De Vorzon and Perry Botkin Jr.
- "Dance for Me" contains a sample of "The Bed's Too Big Without You" by the Police.
- "Flying Away" contains a sample of "God Bless You" by Brenda Russell.
- "Never Been" contains a sample of "Why Oh Why" by McFadden & Whitehead.
- The remix of "No More Drama" contains a sample of "Just Out of Reach" by Chic.

== Charts ==
=== Weekly charts ===
2001–2002 weekly chart performance
Chart	Peak position
Australian Albums (ARIA)	36
Australian Urban Albums (ARIA)	4
Austrian Albums (Ö3 Austria)	17
Belgian Albums (Ultratop Flanders)	32
Belgian Albums (Ultratop Wallonia)	24
Canadian Albums (Billboard)	5
Canadian R&B Albums (Nielsen SoundScan)	4
Danish Albums (Hitlisten)	10
Dutch Albums (Album Top 100)	9
European Top 100 Albums (Music & Media)	11
French Albums (SNEP)	8
German Albums (Offizielle Top 100)	13
Irish Albums (IRMA)	7
Italian Albums (FIMI)	18
Japanese Albums (Oricon)	18
New Zealand Albums (RMNZ)	31
Norwegian Albums (VG-lista)	19
Scottish Albums (Official Charts)	8
Swedish Albums (Sverigetopplistan)	2
Swiss Albums (Schweizer Hitparade)	7
UK Albums (Official Charts)	4
UK R&B Albums (Official Charts)	1
US Billboard 200	2
US Top R&B/Hip-Hop Albums (Billboard)	1

=== Year-end charts ===
2001 year-end chart performance
Chart	Position
Canadian Albums (Nielsen SoundScan)	50
Canadian R&B Albums (Nielsen SoundScan)	11
Dutch Albums (Album Top 100)	71
European Top 100 Albums (Music & Media)	65
French Albums (SNEP)	62
Italian Albums (FIMI)	98
Swedish Albums (Sverigetopplistan)	43
Swiss Albums (Schweizer Hitparade)	62
UK Albums (OCC)	101
US Billboard 200	85
US Top R&B/Hip-Hop Albums (Billboard)	32

2002 year-end chart performance
Chart	Position
Canadian R&B Albums (Nielsen SoundScan)	58
Dutch Albums (Album Top 100)	49
European Top 100 Albums (Music & Media)	51
French Albums (SNEP)	115
Swiss Albums (Schweizer Hitparade)	74
UK Albums (OCC)	49
US Billboard 200	73
US Top R&B/Hip-Hop Albums (Billboard)	32

2002 year-end chart performance for the reissue
Chart	Position
Canadian Albums (Nielsen SoundScan)	106
Canadian R&B Albums (Nielsen SoundScan)	19

== Certifications ==
Certifications and sales
Region	Certification	Certified units/sales
Canada (Music Canada)	2× Platinum	200,000^{^}
France (SNEP)	Gold	287,900
Germany (BVMI)	Gold	150,000^{‡}
Japan (RIAJ)	Gold	100,000^{^}
Netherlands (NVPI)	Gold	40,000^{^}
South Africa (RISA)	Gold	25,000^{*}
Sweden (GLF)	Gold	40,000^{^}
Switzerland (IFPI Switzerland)	Platinum	40,000^{^}
United Kingdom (BPI)	Platinum	578,500
United States (RIAA)	3× Platinum	3,100,000
Summaries
Europe (IFPI)	Platinum	1,000,000^{*}
^{*} Sales figures based on certification alone.^{^} Shipments figures based on certification alone.^{‡} Sales+streaming figures based on certification alone.

== Release history ==
Release dates and formats
Region	Date	Edition(s)	Format(s)	Label(s)	Ref.
Japan	August 18, 2001	Standard	CD	Universal	
France	August 27, 2001	Standard	CD	MCA	
United Kingdom	August 27, 2001	Standard	CD	MCA	
United States	August 28, 2001	Standard	Cassette; CD; vinyl	MCA	
Germany	September 17, 2001	Standard	CD	Universal	
United States	January 29, 2002	Reissue	CD	MCA	
United Kingdom	February 4, 2002	Reissue	CD	MCA	
Japan	February 21, 2002	Reissue	CD	Universal	
Japan	February 21, 2002	Special tour	Enhanced CD + CD	Universal	
Australia	February 25, 2002	Reissue	CD	Universal	
France	May 16, 2002	Reissue	CD	MCA	

== See also ==
- Mary J. Blige discography
- List of Billboard number-one R&B albums of 2001
- List of UK R&B Albums Chart number ones of 2002
