= Ooh! =

2003 single by Mary J. Blige

Single by Mary J. Blige

from the album Love & Life
- Released: August 25, 2003
- Recorded: December 2–6, 2002
- Genre: Hip hop soul
- Length: 4:07
- Label: Geffen
- Songwriters: Mary J. Blige; Sean Combs; Dimitri Christo; Hamilton Bohannon; Mechalie Jamison
- Producers: Sean Combs; D-Nat

Mary J. Blige singles chronology
"Love @ 1st Sight" (2003)	"Ooh!" (2003)	"Whenever I Say Your Name" (2003)

Music video
- "Ooh!" on YouTube

"Ooh!" is a song recorded by American singer Mary J. Blige for her sixth studio album Love & Life (2003). It was written by Blige, Sean Combs, Dimitri Christo, and Mechalie Jamison, while production was helmed by Combs and Christo. The song contains excerpts from Hamilton Bohannon's 1973 track "Singing a Song for My Mother", hence Bohannon is also credited as a songwriter. "Ooh!" was released as the second single from Love & Life on August 25, 2003, by Geffen Records.

A moderate commercial success, "Ooh!" peaked at number 29 on the US Billboard Hot 100. Critically acclaimed, it was nominated for Best Female R&B Vocal Performance at the 46th Annual Grammy Awards. An accompanying music video for the song was directed by Sanji, and depicts Blige fighting and dancing as different versions of herself, who all represented her inner emotions and feelings. Furthermore, a remix featuring 50 Cent, Lloyd Banks, and Young Buck also accompanied the song.

== Background ==
"Ooh!" was as written by Blige along with Sean Combs, Dimitri "The Natural a.k.a. D-Nat" Christo, and Mechalie Jamison, while production was helmed by Combs and Christo. The song contains excerpts from the 1973 song "Singing a Song for My Mother" by American musician Hamilton Bohannon, itself widely known for being sampled on the 1991 hip-hop classic, "I Gotta Have It" by Ed O.G and Da Bulldogs. It was Combs who asked Blige to write over the Ed O.G. sample. In a 2003 interview with MTV News she commented: "Puff heard it and he sat there with his mouth open. He was [nodding his head], but he never said anything. He later said that "[That] was fire!" so we let Jimmy Iovine hear it and Jimmy was like, "I like it." Dr. Dre heard it and was like, "That's the joint right there." Then we played it for K-Gee and he just lost his mind. We played it for people all over the world when we went on the promotional tour and everything kept coming back 'Ooh, ooh, ooh, ooh, ooh, ooh'."

== Critical reception ==
BBC Music critic Keysha Davis called "Ooh!" a "hip-hop inspired club anthem. Backed by a trudging horn riff, and an instantly recognisable break-beat; [it] forms the perfect compliment for Mary's gravely vocals." Elizabeth Berry Mendez from The Washington Post wrote: "With its slinky saxophone and Mary's ripe alto, "Ooh!" is the kind of dance-floor soul jam that recalls Motown's heyday." Similarly, Billboard's Michael Paoletta remarked that the song "recalls "Rock Steady"-era Aretha Franklin." In his review of parent album Love & Life, David Browne from Entertainment Weekly noted: [The album] tried to present a more contented Blige but mainly reduced her to moaning orgasmic lines like "Ooh, what you do to me" to thudding Diddy-produced beats." BET.com called the song one of the "highlights of Blige's and Combs's reunion on 2003's Love & Life."

== Music video ==
Blige was initially eyeying Chris Robinson, who had helmed the music video for Love & Life's previous single "Love @ 1st Sight," to once again direct her. Due to scheduling conflicts, Sanjeeva "Sanji" Senaka, director of her 2001 music video for "No More Drama," was eventually selected to direct the visuals for "Ooh!." Dedicated to the soldiers in the war, it portrays Blige fighting and dancing different versions of herself, who all represented her inner emotions and feelings. "Ooh!" world premiered at the end of its making of episode on BET's Access Granted.

== Track listings ==
Promotional single
No.	Title	Length
1.	"Ooh!" (Radio Edit)	3:59
2.	"Ooh!" (Album Version)	4:07
3.	"Ooh!" (Instrumental)	4:12
4.	"Ooh!" (A Cappella)	3:49

== Credits and personnel ==
Credits adapted from the liner notes of Love & Life.

- Mary J. Blige – vocals, writer
- Hamilton Bohannon – writer (sample)
- Dimitri "The Natural a.k.a. D-Nat" Christo – producer, writer
- Sean Combs – producer, writer
- Patrick Dillett – recording engineer
- Mechalie Jamison – writer
- Shannon Jones – background vocalist
- Kandace Love – background vocalist
- Tony Maserati – mixing engineer
- Alex Seton – engineering assistant
- Mario Winans – additional music

== Charts ==
=== Weekly charts ===
Weekly chart performance for "Ooh!"
Chart (2003)	Peak position
US Billboard Hot 100	29
US Hot R&B/Hip-Hop Songs (Billboard)	14
US Rhythmic Airplay (Billboard)	17

=== Year-end charts ===
Year-end chart performance for "Ooh!"
Chart (2003)	Position
US Hot R&B/Hip-Hop Songs (Billboard)	82

== Release history ==
Release dates and formats for "Ooh!"
Region	Date	Format(s)	Label(s)	Ref.
United States	August 25, 2003	Urban contemporary radio	Geffen	
