= Dance for Me (Mary J. Blige song) =

2002 single by Mary J. Blige

- Standard artwork for continental European releases

Single by Mary J. Blige featuring Common

from the album No More Drama
- Released: January 28, 2002
- Length: 4:47
- Label: MCA
- Songwriters: Mary J. Blige; Bruce Miller; Lonnie Lynn; Sting
- Producer: Dame Grease

Mary J. Blige singles chronology
"No More Drama" (2001)	"Dance for Me" (2002)	"Rainy Dayz" (2002)

Common singles chronology
"In the Sun" (2001)	"Dance for Me" (2002)	"Love of My Life (An Ode to Hip-Hop)" (2002)

"Dance for Me" is a song by American singer Mary J. Blige featuring American rapper Ahkim Miller from Blige's fifth studio album, No More Drama (2001). Produced by Dame Grease, the track was written by the artists alongside Bruce Miller with an additional writing credit going to Sting for the sampling of the 1979 song "The Bed's Too Big Without You" by English rock band the Police. For the No More Drama 2002 re-release, the version featuring Ahkim Miller was replaced with the more widely-known version featuring Common. The subsequent single release was the version with Common.

The song released as the album's second single in select European territories on January 28, 2002. The single never received a release within the United States, where "No More Drama" served as the album's second single. The music video was directed by Urban Ström. There are two versions of the music video released. One is the video for the radio edit of the song, the other video is for the Plutonium Remix. Both versions feature rapper Common.

== Track listings ==
All single versions of "Dance for Me" feature Common except "Dance for Me" (G-Club mix).

UK CD1

1. "Dance for Me" (radio edit) – 3:25
2. "Dance for Me" (Plutonium rock mix) – 4:18
3. "Dance for Me" (C-Swing Deliverance mix) – 4:56

UK CD2

1. "Dance for Me" (radio edit) – 3:25
2. "Dance for Me" (Sunship vocal mix) – 6:15
3. "Dance for Me" (Sunship dub) – 4:25

UK 12-inch single

A1. "Dance for Me" (radio edit) – 3:25
A2. "Dance for Me" (Plutonium rock mix) – 4:18
B1. "Dance for Me" (C-Swing Deliverance mix) – 4:56
B2. "Dance for Me" (Sunship vocal mix) – 6:15

European CD single

1. "Dance for Me" (radio edit) – 3:25
2. "Dance for Me" (Plutonium radio edit) – 3:21

Australian CD single

1. "Dance for Me" (radio edit) – 3:25
2. "Dance for Me" (Plutonium rock mix) – 4:18
3. "Dance for Me" (G-Club mix) – 7:12
4. "Dance for Me" (Sunship main mix) – 6:15

== Charts ==
=== Weekly charts ===
Chart (2001–2002)	Peak position
Australia (ARIA)	66
Australian Urban (ARIA)	15
Belgium (Ultratop 50 Flanders)	48
Belgium (Ultratop 50 Wallonia)	36
Denmark (Tracklisten)	19
Europe (Eurochart Hot 100)	56
Finland (Suomen virallinen lista)	20
France (SNEP)	82
Germany (GfK)	82
Ireland (IRMA)	24
Italy (FIMI)	42
Netherlands (Dutch Top 40)	29
Netherlands (Single Top 100)	55
Scottish Singles Sales (Official Charts)	22
Sweden (Sverigetopplistan)	44
Switzerland (Schweizer Hitparade)	50
UK Singles (Official Charts)	13
UK Hip Hop/R&B (Official Charts)	4

=== Year-end charts ===
Chart (2002)	Position
UK Urban (Music Week)	35

== Release history ==
Region	Date	Format(s)	Label(s)	Ref.
United Kingdom	January 28, 2002	12-inch vinyl; CD; cassette	MCA	
Australia	March 18, 2002	CD	MCA	
