= Villa Il Palagio =

Farm estate in Tuscany, Italy

Coordinates: 43.6969°N 11.4478°E

Villa Il Palagio is a villa and farm estate in Figline Valdarno, in the province of Florence in the Italian region Tuscany. The estate has belonged to the musician Sting and his wife Trudie Styler since the late 1990s.

== History ==
Il Palagio was built in the 17th century. In the late 18th century it was bought by the wealthy Martelli family. They sold it in 1819 to Countess Carlotta Barbolani of Montauto, the widow of the Duke of San Clemente and it remained in this family's hands for some 150 years. In the early 20th century, Duke Simone Vincenzo Velluti Zati di San Clemente was responsible for building an oil mill and grain store and beginning to produce wine in its vineyards. A chapel was added in 1958.

The estate was purchased by Sting and his wife Trudie Styler in 1999. When the couple bought the villa it was in a state of disrepair and they hired architect Arabella Lennox-Boyd to carry out a full restoration of the estate, which took seven years. On 11 September 2001, Sting and a large ensemble of musicians recorded the live album All This Time at the villa on the same day at the September 11 terrorist attacks. Sting's song "Fragile" was dedicated to the victims of the attacks. In 2009, winter photography of the grounds covered in snow was taken for Sting's album release that year, If on a Winter's Night.... Both that and his 2006 album Songs from the Labyrinth were written at the estate. The second phase of rehearsals for The Police Reunion Tour took place over the course of four weeks at the estate in the spring of 2007. The bells featured at the beginning of "The Bells of St. Thomas" from Sting's 2021 album The Bridge are a recording of the bells of Il Palagio. Sting and Trudie often host parties and private concerts for friends and family at Il Palagio.

== Features ==
The villa was built in the 16th-century Tuscan style and the estate contains four guesthouses and two annexes to the main villa, which can accommodate up to 50 guests, and up to 500 guests for wedding receptions and parties. The estate has a life-size chessboard, a treehouse overlooking a lake, a chapel and a giant statue of Buddha, a yoga centre, a tennis court, and a swimming pool.

== Produce ==
The estate, of some 350 hectares, is run by Paolo Rossi and his brother Joe who is the head chef. Gluten-free breads and pizzas are on the menu. The estate is a producer of wine, honey, cherries, apricots, peaches and olive oil. It has been making organic olive oil since 1999. As of 2014, the estate produces six different wines.
