= Sacred Love =

Studio album by Sting
- Released: 29 September 2003
- Studios: Studio Mega (Paris); The Hit Factory (New York); Capitol (Hollywood)
- Genres: Jazz pop; R&B; world
- Length: 55:20
- Label: A&M
- Producers: Kipper; Sting

Sting chronology
...All This Time (2001)	Sacred Love (2003)	Songs from the Labyrinth (2006)

Singles from Sacred Love
- 1. "Send Your Love" Released: 30 July 2003; 2. "Whenever I Say Your Name" Released: 10 November 2003; 3. "Stolen Car (Take Me Dancing)" Released: 26 April 2004

Professional ratings
Aggregate scores
Source	Rating
Metacritic	66/100
Review scores
Source	Rating
Allmusic	2.5/5 stars
Entertainment Weekly	B−
Mojo	3/5 stars
PopMatters	7/10 stars
Q	3/5 stars
Rolling Stone	3.5/5 stars

Sacred Love is the seventh studio album by the English musician Sting. The album was released on 29 September 2003. The album featured smoother, R&B-style beats and collaborations with hip-hop artist Mary J. Blige and sitar player Anoushka Shankar. Some songs like "Inside" and "Dead Man's Rope" were well received, and Sting had experimented with new sounds, in particular the more rock-influenced "This War".

Sacred Love received positive reviews from critics and was a commercial success, peaking at number three in the US and UK. It would be Sting's last album of original material until The Last Ship (2013).

== Background ==
Sting adapted the first quatrain of William Blake's Auguries of Innocence for the first four sung lines of "Send Your Love".

Sting's collaboration with Blige, "Whenever I Say Your Name", won the Grammy Award for Best Pop Collaboration with Vocals at the 46th Grammy Awards in 2004. The first single "Send Your Love" was also nominated for the Grammy Award for Best Male Pop Vocal Performance, but it lost to "Cry Me a River" by Justin Timberlake.

In August 2015, Mylène Farmer and Sting duetted on "Stolen Car (Take Me Dancing)" and released it as the lead single from Farmer's tenth studio album, Interstellaires; the track is produced by The Avener.

== Track listing ==
All tracks are written by Sting, except "Shape of My Heart" written by Sting and Dominic Miller. All tracks produced by Sting and Kipper; co-production on "Send Your Love" by Victor Calderone, and "Never Coming Home" by BT.

Sacred Love track listing
No.	Title	Length
1.	"Inside"	4:46
2.	"Send Your Love" (featuring Vicente Amigo)	4:38
3.	"Whenever I Say Your Name" (featuring Mary J. Blige)	5:25
4.	"Dead Man's Rope"	5:43
5.	"Never Coming Home"	4:58
6.	"Stolen Car (Take Me Dancing)"	3:56
7.	"Forget About the Future"	5:12
8.	"This War"	5:29
9.	"The Book of My Life" (featuring Anoushka Shankar)	6:15
10.	"Sacred Love"	5:43
11.	"Send Your Love" (Dave Audé remix)	3:15
Total length:		55:20

Bonus track (excluded from US and Canadian editions)
No.	Title	Length
12.	"Shape of My Heart" (live)	2:18
Total length:		57:38

SACD bonus track (excluded from US and Canadian editions)
No.	Title	Length
13.	"Like a Beautiful Smile"	4:43
Total length:		1:02:21

== Personnel ==
- Sting – vocals, keyboards, guitars, bass (1–10, 12), Turkish clarinet
- Kipper – keyboards, programming, backing vocals
- David Hartley – piano and choir arrangements
- Jason Rebello – acoustic piano, Rhodes electric piano
- Jeff Young – Hammond organ
- Dominic Miller – guitars
- Vicente Amigo – flamenco guitar (2)
- Anoushka Shankar – sitar (9)
- Danny Dunlap – bass (11)
- Christian McBride – double bass
- Manu Katché – drums
- Vinnie Colaiuta – drums
- Rhani Krija – percussion
- Valerie Denys – castanets
- Aref Durvesh – tabla
- Levon Minassian – duduk
- Clark Gayton – trombone
- Chris Botti – trumpet
- Jacqueline Thomas – cello
- Mary J. Blige – lead vocals (3)
- Katreese Barnes – backing vocals
- Ada Dyer – backing vocals
- Lance Ellington – backing vocals
- Donna Gardier – backing vocals
- Joy Rose – featured and backing vocals
- Bahija Rhapl – ethnic vocals
- Choeur de Radio France – choir
- Philip White – associate chorus master

=== Technical credits ===
- Simon Osborne – recording, mixing
- Steve Miller – mix engineer (11)
- Peter "Hopps" Lorimer – assistant engineer
- Donal Hodgson – Pro Tools engineer and programming
- Claudius Mittendorfer – technical assistant
- Charlie Paakkari – technical assistant
- Rodolphe Plisson – technical assistant
- Dave Audé – remixing and additional production (11)
- Chris Blair – stereo mastering
- Peter Mew – 5.1 mastering
- Danny Quatrochi – personal technician
- Recorded at Studio Mega (Paris, France); The Hit Factory (New York City, New York); Capitol Studios (Hollywood, California).
- Mastered at Abbey Road Studios (London, UK).

=== Production credits ===
- Martin Kierszenbaum – A&R
- Andrea Ruffalo – A&R coordinator
- Tam Fairgrieve – production manager
- Richard Frankel – package design
- Paolo Roversi – photography
- Kathryn Schenker – management

== Charts ==
=== Weekly charts ===
Chart (2003–2004)	Peak position
Australian Albums (ARIA)	13
Austrian Albums (Ö3 Austria)	2
Belgian Albums (Ultratop Flanders)	6
Belgian Albums (Ultratop Wallonia)	6
Canadian Albums (Billboard)	3
Danish Albums (Hitlisten)	1
Dutch Albums (Album Top 100)	3
Finnish Albums (Suomen virallinen lista)	8
French Albums (SNEP)	5
German Albums (Offizielle Top 100)	2
Hungarian Albums (MAHASZ)	4
Irish Albums (IRMA)	8
Italian Albums (FIMI)	1
Japanese Albums (Oricon)	10
New Zealand Albums (RMNZ)	13
Norwegian Albums (VG-lista)	3
Polish Albums (ZPAV)	1
Portuguese Albums (AFP)	2
Scottish Albums (Official Charts)	3
Spanish Albums (PROMUSICAE)	5
Swedish Albums (Sverigetopplistan)	3
Swiss Albums (Schweizer Hitparade)	1
UK Albums (Official Charts)	3
US Billboard 200	3

=== Year-end charts ===
Chart (2003)	Position
Austrian Albums (Ö3 Austria)	45
Belgian Albums (Ultratop Wallonia)	52
Dutch Albums (Album Top 100)	27
French Albums (SNEP)	112
German Albums (Offizielle Top 100)	42
Swedish Albums (Sverigetopplistan)	89
Swiss Albums (Schweizer Hitparade)	19
UK Albums (OCC)	87
US Billboard 200	122
Worldwide Albums (IFPI)	34
Chart (2004)	Position
Dutch Albums (Album Top 100)	51
US Billboard 200	130

== Certifications and sales ==
Region	Certification	Certified units/sales
Canada (Music Canada)	Platinum	100,000^{^}
Czech Republic	—	10,000
France (SNEP)	Gold	100,000^{*}
Germany (BVMI)	Gold	100,000^{^}
Hungary (MAHASZ)	Gold	10,000^{^}
Japan (RIAJ)	Gold	92,053
Netherlands (NVPI)	Gold	40,000^{^}
Russia (NFPF)	Platinum	20,000^{*}
Switzerland (IFPI Switzerland)	Platinum	40,000^{^}
United Kingdom (BPI)	Gold	100,000^{^}
United States (RIAA)	Platinum	1,000,000^{^}
Summaries
Europe (IFPI)	Platinum	1,000,000^{*}
Worldwide	—	2,500,000
^{*} Sales figures based on certification alone.^{^} Shipments figures based on certification alone.
