= Dream Corrosion =

Live album by Gary Numan
- Released: August 1994
- Genre: New wave, synthpop, industrial rock
- Length: 62:34 / 67:29
- Label: Numa, Eagle
- Producer: Gary Numan

Gary Numan chronology
The Best of Gary Numan 1978-1983 (1993)	Dream Corrosion (1994)	Sacrifice (1994)

Professional ratings
Review scores
Source	Rating
AllMusic	3/5 stars

Dream Corrosion is a 1994 live album by the British electronic musician Gary Numan. It was recorded at the London Hammersmith Apollo on 6 November 1993, and was originally released under the Numa Records label.

== Track listing ==
All tracks written by Gary Numan except where noted. All timings are approximate and will vary slightly with different equipment.

=== 1994 Numa LP, MC and CD release (NUMA/C/CD 1010) ===
Disc one

1. "Mission (Intro)" – 2:17
2. "Machine and Soul" – 6:16
3. "Outland" – 4:09
4. "Me! I Disconnect From You" – 3:14
5. "We Are So Fragile" – 3:02
6. "Respect" – 4:12
7. "Shame" (Numan/Beggs) – 4:32
8. "Films" – 5:16
9. "Dream Killer" – 4:42
10. "Down in the Park" – 6:12
11. "My World Storm" – 5:11
12. "The Machman" – 3:43
13. "Generator" (Numan/Kipper) – 5:25
14. "Noise Noise" – 4:21

Disc two

1. "Cars" – 5:16
2. "Voix" – 5:34
3. "You Are in My Vision" – 3:41
4. "It Must Have Been Years" – 4:32
5. "That's Too Bad" – 3:41
6. "Remind Me To Smile" – 3:50
7. "I'm An Agent" – 4:44
8. "Are 'Friends' Electric?" – 7:06
9. "My Breathing" – 7:10
10. "I Don't Believe" – 4:36
11. "Bombers" – 4:46
12. "Jo The Waiter" – 6:32
13. "We Are Glass" – 5:59
- Track listing applies to the CD release.

=== 2003 Eagle Records CD reissue (EDMCD 160) ===
Same CD track listing as Numa release. Different front, rear and inner tray artwork and an essay by Dominic Jones.

== Personnel ==
- Gary Numan – vocals, guitar, producer, mixer
- Richard Beasley – drums
- Ade Orange – keyboards, bass
- John Webb – keyboards, saxophone
- Kipper – guitars, backing vocals
- TJ Davis – backing vocals
- NuFederation – sleeve design
