= No More Drama (song) =

2001 single by Mary J. Blige

Single by Mary J. Blige

from the album No More Drama
- Released: October 30, 2001
- Length: 5:26
- Label: MCA
- Songwriters: James Harris III; Terry Lewis; Barry De Vorzon; Perry Botkin
- Producers: Jimmy Jam and Terry Lewis

Mary J. Blige singles chronology
"Family Affair" (2001)	"No More Drama" (2001)	"Dance for Me" (2002)

"No More Drama" is a song by American recording artist Mary J. Blige. Written and produced by duo Jimmy Jam and Terry Lewis, it was initially intended for Blige's fourth studio album Mary (1999) before she insisted on making it the title track of her fifth studio album of the same name (2001). The song embodies portions of "The Young and the Restless Theme" (1973), written by Barry De Vorzon and Perry Botkin Jr. Lyrically, the song is about going through hard times and moving on from pain.

The song was released to acclaim from music critics, who called it one of her finest recordings yet. It was issued as No More Drama's second single in the United States on October 30, 2001, and as the third single in certain European markets, where "Dance for Me" had served as the second single instead. It became another hit for Blige, peaking at number 15 on the US Billboard Hot 100 and number nine in the United Kingdom. The video for the song won Blige her first MTV Video Music Award for Best R&B Video.

== Background ==
"No More Drama" samples from "Nadia's Theme," incidental music for the 1971 film Bless the Beasts and Children which later came to prominence as the theme music for the American soap opera The Young and the Restless. Initially written and produced by duo Jimmy Jam and Terry Lewis for Blige's fourth studio album Mary (1999), it was left off the album after Blige suggested to transfer it to her next project. Jimmy Jam commented on the creation process: "I'm a big soap opera fan, and I always wanted to do something using The Young and the Restless theme. We figured Mary was at a point in her life that she knew about drama and it was a song lyrically she could sing. We wrote all the lyrics, but always with the intention that she would rewrite it to make it personal to her." Upon hearing, Blige "said: "You been following me around with a spy or something? This is exactly what I'm feeling. I'm not changing a thing on this one"."

An ode to self-reliance and the need to leave the damaging stuff and people in the rearview. Blige told Jet in 2001: "This song is demanding that you stay away from my life if you’re going to bring me drama. I am saying "Enough is enough of this nonsense. Enough of this self-abuse, people abuse, fake friends, the whole nine. Beat it!"." She further spoke about her feeling behind the track in an interview with The Daily Telegraph: "I go through the emotion of being a child growing up in the projects [...] and every woman around you being beaten so badly by men you can’t even understand it, and then growing up and realizing you’re repeating all those patterns, you’re drinking the alcohol and doing the drugs and being abused by men, and the pain and frustration of not being able to stop it. I rewind through that every time I sing it. I want to give people the real truth." Perry Botkin Jr., one of the song's original composers, who had never heard of Blige prior to this was delighted to get a writing credit, saying: "I woke up one morning and I'm on the cutting edge of R&B. These days, I'm completely removed from pop music — except when [royalty] checks arrive."

== Promotion ==
Blige performed the song at the 44th Annual Grammy Awards on February 27, 2002. It marked her first solo performance at the show, following two collaborative performances in 1998 and 1997, respectively. The singer, dressed in a shiny gold two-piece pants suit and sporting a burgundy spike cut, emerged from a door in the middle of the stage, before she slowly worked the stage in front of a screen of promo images and the song's official music video. Blige received standing ovations for her performance. She also sang "No More Drama" at the halftime show of Super Bowl LVI in 2022. As she sang, the piano section from English pop rock band Tears For Fears's 1985 hit single "Head Over Heels" was incorporated into the track.

The song was featured in Bille Woodruff's 2003 dance film Honey and later also used as the background theme for both Tyler Perry's Why Did I Get Married? (2007) and Why Did I Get Married Too? (2010). The line "so tired, tired of all the drama" was briefly sampled in Azealia Banks 2013 single "Yung Rapunxel." Frequently used in singing competition televisions shows, Joshua Ledet performed "No More Drama" during the eleventh season of American Idol. James Arthur also performed this song, during the ninth series of The X Factor. La'Porsha Renae, runner-up of 15th season of American Idol, performed this song during the show's last season. Wé McDonald covered the song on The Voice season 11 in the Knockout Round, whhile Sam Lavery sang the song in the sing-off of The X Factor 2016.

== Critical reception ==
"No More Drama" was released to universal acclaim. Alexis Petridis from The Guardian called it "a visceral, cathartic howl of a song, wrapped up in a superb soap-opera-theme-sampling Jam & Lewis production. Its climax is breathtaking." Da'Shan Smith from uDiscoverMusic found that "No More Drama" saw "Blige navigate unfamiliar territory: contentment. Recalling the heartbreak and the ups and downs she’s navigated through her life, Mary declares no more drama in one of her most dramatic performances." Vibe's Lela Olds wrote: "As fans of her music, we’ve seen her go through so much through the years, but it was so inspirational for her to declare she’s done with the drama in her life through this song." BET.com wrote of the song: "[It] is a pivotal moment in Mary's evolution. Over an epic Jimmy Jam and Terry Lewis interpolation of The Young & The Restless theme, Mary lets loose like never before, tearfully wailing of moving beyond the painful struggles of her early life—and setting the stage for the uplifting, happy-to-be-me music to come."

Nerisha Penrose from Billboard wrote: "On the dramatic cut, Mary has grown weary of her significant other and his drama and is ready to hit the refresh button on her life, this time leaving all the stress of her past relationship behind." Her colleague Chuck Taylor wrote in his 2001 review of the song: "Jimmy Jam and Terr Lewis don't rest on the sample, though. The pair's production adds lush instrumentation and harmonies to the mix, and the Timbaland-style electronic blips and burps bring in the 21st-century factor [...] Blige demonstrates all the strength and passion one would expect from her; by the three-minute mark, she has long dropped the script, soaring over the song's form with her own improvised licks." In a review of its parent album, Sal Cinquemani, writing for Slant Magazine, remarked that "the sheer drama of the title track is, in fact, what elevates it above the rest of the album, interpolating the theme song from The Young & The Restless throughout. Unfortunately, the Jimmy Jam & Terry Lewis-penned track aims to empower with such thematic obscurities as "I choose to win"."

== Music video ==
A music video for "No More Drama" was directed by Sanji Senaka. It features cameos by singer Mariah Carey and rapper P. Diddy who had both recently experienced their own very publicized dramas, with Carey going through personal and professional problems following her movie and album Glitter, and Diddy facing legal troubles following a night club shooting. Senaka commented that the video was "about the quality of the performance, even though I didn't have the luxury of rehearsal times. I didn't want a "video" performance", the whole "arguing" thing." I wanted people's souls to connect. "No More Drama" won Blige her first MTV Video Music Award for Best R&B Video. It also earned Blige a nomination for the NAACP Image Award for Outstanding Music Video, but lost to India Arie's "Little Things" (2002).

The visuals follow the lives of three individuals battling life difficulties and tragedies. They contain images of a depressed man that is struggling to overcome drugs (played by actor David Venafro), a gang member who lost a friend in a shooting and a woman who is verbally and physically abused by her partner. While the theme of the video is dramatic, it ends on an encouraging note as the gang member decides to end the cycle of killing by leaving his gang; the drug addict is seen to be headed for a rehab clinic to combat his addiction and the woman finding the strength to leave her abusive lover behind and start a new life. Carey and Diddy appear individually on televisions stacked in a store front window, in front of which Blige is singing. Aside from those images, Senaka added footage regarding "America’s New War" in motion after the September 11 attacks.

== Track listings ==
All versions of the P. Diddy/Mario Winans remix feature P. Diddy.

US 12-inch single

A1. "No More Drama" (P. Diddy/Mario Winans remix LP version) – 4:09
A2. "No More Drama" (P. Diddy/Mario Winans remix instrumental) – 4:09
A3. "No More Drama" (P. Diddy/Mario Winans remix a cappella) – 4:10
B1. "No More Drama" (Thunderpuss Club Anthem mix) – 9:18
B2. "No More Drama" (Drums of Thunderpuss) – 4:57

UK CD1

1. "No More Drama" (radio edit) – 4:08
2. "No More Drama" (P. Diddy/Mario Winans remix LP version) – 4:08
3. "No More Drama" (The Twin Disco Experience remix) – 7:30
4. "No More Drama" (video)

UK CD2

1. "No More Drama" (radio edit) – 4:08
2. "Mary Jane (All Night Long)" – 4:41
3. "Everything" (album version) – 4:59

UK 12-inch single

A1. "No More Drama" (remix LP version)
A2. "No More Drama" (remix instrumental)
B1. "No More Drama" (The Twin Disco Experience remix)
B2. "No More Drama" (remix a cappella)

UK cassette single

1. "No More Drama" (radio edit) – 4:08
2. "No More Drama" (P. Diddy/Mario Winans remix LP version) – 4:08

European CD single

1. "No More Drama" (radio edit) – 4:08
2. "No More Drama" (Twin Disco Experience remix) – 7:30

Australasian CD single

1. "No More Drama" (radio edit) – 4:08
2. "No More Drama" (Twin Disco Experience remix edit) – 4:09
3. "No More Drama" (Thunderpuss Club Anthem mix) – 9:17
4. "No More Drama" (video)

== Charts ==
=== Weekly charts ===
Weekly chart performance for "No More Drama"
Chart (2001–2002)	Peak position
Australia (ARIA)	30
Belgium (Ultratop 50 Flanders)	34
Belgium (Ultratip Bubbling Under Wallonia)	6
Europe (Eurochart Hot 100)	31
France (SNEP)	42
Germany (GfK)	47
Ireland (IRMA)	24
Netherlands (Dutch Top 40)	15
Netherlands (Single Top 100)	15
New Zealand (Recorded Music NZ)	38
Romania (Romanian Top 100)	94
Scottish Singles Sales (Official Charts)	20
Sweden (Sverigetopplistan)	29
Switzerland (Schweizer Hitparade)	17
UK Singles (Official Charts)	9
UK Hip Hop/R&B (Official Charts)	4
US Billboard Hot 100	15
US Dance Club Songs (Billboard) Thunderpuss remixes	1
US Dance Singles Sales (Billboard) Thunderpuss remixes	1
US Hot R&B/Hip-Hop Songs (Billboard)	16
US Pop Airplay (Billboard)	18
US Rhythmic Airplay (Billboard)	23

=== Year-end charts ===
Year-end chart performance for "No More Drama"
Chart (2002)	Position
Netherlands (Dutch Top 40)	79
UK Singles (OCC)	184
UK Urban (Music Week)	23
US Billboard Hot 100	79
US Dance Club Play (Billboard)	15
US Hot R&B/Hip-Hop Singles & Tracks (Billboard)	68
US Mainstream Top 40 (Billboard)	80
US Rhythmic Top 40 (Billboard)	74

== Certifications ==
Certifications for "No More Drama"
Region	Certification	Certified units/sales
United Kingdom (BPI)	Silver	200,000^{‡}
^{‡} Sales+streaming figures based on certification alone.

== Release history ==
Release history and formats for "No More Drama"
Region	Date	Format(s)	Label(s)	Ref.
United States	October 30, 2001	Rhythmic contemporary; urban AC radio	MCA	
United States	November 6, 2001	Urban radio	MCA	
United Kingdom	April 29, 2002	CD; cassette	MCA	
United Kingdom	May 6, 2002	12-inch vinyl	MCA	
Australia	June 3, 2002	CD	MCA	

== See also ==
- List of number-one dance singles of 2002 (U.S.)
