= Family Affair (Mary J. Blige song) =

2001 single by Mary J. Blige

Single by Mary J. Blige

from the album No More Drama
- B-side: "Checkin' for Me"; "Your Child"
- Released: July 24, 2001
- Recorded: 2000–2001
- Studio: Record One (Sherman Oaks, California); Quad (Manhattan, New York)
- Genre: Dance; hip hop; R&B
- Length: 4:25 (album version); 4:04 (radio edit)
- Label: MCA
- Songwriters: Mary J. Blige; Bruce Miller; Andre Young; Camara Kambon; Michael Elizondo
- Producer: Dr. Dre

Mary J. Blige singles chronology
"911" (2000)	"Family Affair" (2001)	"No More Drama" (2001)

Music video
- "Family Affair" on YouTube

"Family Affair" is a song by American singer Mary J. Blige. It was written by Blige, her brother Bruce Miller, Camara Kambon, Michael Elizondo, and producer Dr. Dre for her fifth studio album, No More Drama (2001). The single topped the US Billboard Hot 100 for six weeks in late 2001, becoming Blige's first and only Hot 100 number-one single. Worldwide, the song reached number one in France and entered the top 10 in 14 additional countries across Europe and Oceania.

"Family Affair" was the 12th-biggest song of the 2000s decade in the US and the 99th-biggest song of all time in the country as of 2018. Rolling Stone ranked it number 95 on their list of 100 Best Songs of the 2000s decade.

== Background ==
Dr. Dre created an initial version of the musical portion of "Family Affair" in studio on September 13, 2000, using a bass player and a keyboard player. His studio engineers entitled this version of the song "Fragile" for record-keeping purposes. The instrumental was originally created with Rakim in mind, for use on his then upcoming Aftermath album Oh, My God; however, Rakim ultimately turned it down and the album was never released. Near the end of 2000, Dr. Dre sent Mary J. Blige the instrumental track, after she heard it and decided she wanted to write to it.

Blige recorded vocals over the music based on lyrics penned by Bruce Miller, Camara Kambon and Mike Elizondo. Several weeks later, on January 10, 2001, a near-final but non-lyrical portion of "Fragile" was transferred from digital to analog format and renamed "Family Affair". In late May or early June 2001, at Dr. Dre's suggestion, Blige added a bridge to the song, for which she alone crafted the lyrics. A remix featuring rappers Jadakiss and Fabolous appears on the US CD single.

== Composition ==
Sheet music for "Family Affair" sets the key of G♯ minor with a moderate tempo of 94 beats per minute. The song follows a chord progression C♯m–G♯m7–C♯m–G♯m7, and the vocals span from G♯_{3} to B_{4}.

== Critical reception ==
"Family Affair" received critical acclaim. Alexis Petridis from The Guardian declared the song one "of the all-time great pop-R&B party bangers. Everything about "Family Affair" is perfection: Dr Dre’s simple but devastatingly effective production; Blige’s economical, understated vocal; the fact that every melody line sounds like a hook." Billboard critic Chuck Taylor called "Family Affair" a "finger-poppin' jam" as well as a "smash waiting to happen." He found that "[Blige] sashays over Dr. Dre's muscular funk groove with notable confident ease. She's not even breaking a sweat by screaming big, overblown notes; rather she opts for an authoritative, guttural growl that is countered by layers of sleek, deep-voiced harmonies." Sal Cinquemani, writing for Slant Magazine, remarked that "the song is the latest in a recent slew of club-ready superstar anthems, celebrating the joy and unity of dance. "Let’s get crunk ‘cause Mary’s back," she sings. Mary’s back, indeed, in full form for the first time since 1997’s Share My World."

Da'Shan Smith from uDiscoverMusic found that "Family Affair "was a "reminder that [Blige] could still get down" and that "she started a new era that summer by inviting fans to her dancerie and reminding them they "don’t need no hateration, holleration," over Dr. Dre’s G-Funk production." Stereogum editor Tom Breihan noted that Dr. Dre's "beat is an absolute product of its time, and it also sounds like it’s always existed. The track hits hard, all churning strings and booming drum-sounds and the staccato pianos that Dre loved at the time. It sounds expensive and somehow warlike — the type of thing that should soundtrack a movie scene of military forces mobilizing. In its majestic stomp, "Family Affair" sounds vaguely stressful." Entertainment Weekly's Craig Seymour wrote: "Lyrically, the song celebrates such party virtues as dressing up and hitting the dance floor. But Blige’s bluesy vocal grit adds depth to the track, hinting at the everyday hardships that make partying so rejuvenating and worthwhile." BET.com wrote of the song: "This momentous Dr. Dre-produced banger may have been the first time that Mary really let her hair down and just had fun (you'd have to be having fun to come up with words like "dancery" and "hateration")." Vibe found that "Family Affair" combines a "funky mix of R&B and hip-hop as well as some interesting vocabulary with listeners being told about a "dancery" where "holleration" and "hateration" would not be tolerated."

== Music video ==
The accompanying music video was directed by Dave Meyers. It shows Blige at a nightclub dancing, wearing different outfits, including a black skin revealing one with her hair being black and white in a half bowl half bob cut. The video was filmed at a nightclub.

== Live performances ==
On September 6, 2012, Blige performed the song at the last night of the Democratic National Convention in Charlotte, North Carolina. Ten years later, she also performed it in the Super Bowl LVI halftime show.

== Track listings ==
US CD single
No.	Title	Length
1.	"Family Affair" (LP version)	4:31
2.	"Family Affair" (remix featuring Fabolous and Jadakiss)	4:03
3.	"Family Affair" (instrumental)	4:29
4.	"Family Affair" (acapella)	4:11
5.	"Checkin' for Me" (LP version)	3:05

US 12-inch single
No.	Title	Length
1.	"Family Affair" (radio edit)	4:02
2.	"Family Affair" (instrumental)	4:28
3.	"Family Affair" (LP version)	4:28
4.	"Family Affair" (acapella)	3:51

UK CD single
No.	Title	Length
1.	"Family Affair" (radio edit)	3:35
2.	"Family Affair" (album version)	4:25
3.	"Your Child" (Chucky Thompson's Late Nite mix)	3:12
4.	"Family Affair" (video)

UK 12-inch single
No.	Title	Length
1.	"Family Affair" (radio edit)	3:35
2.	"Family Affair" (album version)	4:25
3.	"Your Child" (Chucky Thompson's Late Nite mix)	3:12

UK cassette single
No.	Title	Length
1.	"Family Affair" (radio edit)	3:35
2.	"Your Child" (Chucky Thompson's Late Nite mix)	3:12

European CD single
No.	Title	Length
1.	"Family Affair" (radio edit)	4:02
2.	"Family Affair" (instrumental)	4:28

Australasian and Japanese CD single
No.	Title	Length
1.	"Family Affair" (radio edit)	4:02
2.	"Family Affair" (album version)	4:28
3.	"Your Child" (Chucky Thompson's Late Nite mix)	3:12
4.	"Your Child" (video)	3:43

== Credits and personnel ==
Credits are taken from the No More Drama album booklet.

Studios

- Recorded at Record One (Sherman Oaks, California) and Quad Recording Studios (Manhattan, New York)
- Mixed at Record One (Sherman Oaks, California)
- Mastered at The Hit Factory (New York City)

Personnel

- Mary J. Blige – writing, all vocals
- Bruce Miller – writing
- Dr. Dre – writing (as Andre Young), production, mixing
- Camara Kambon – writing, keyboards
- Mike Elizondo – writing, bass
- Mauricio "Veto" Iragorri – engineering
- Chris Ribando – engineering
- Tom Sweeney – assistant engineering
- Kin Bengoa – assistant engineering
- Larry Chatman – project coordination
- Herb Powers – mastering

== Charts ==
=== Weekly charts ===
Weekly chart performance for "Family Affair"
Chart (2001–2002)	Peak position
Australia (ARIA)	8
Australian Urban (ARIA)	3
Austria (Ö3 Austria Top 40)	20
Belgium (Ultratop 50 Flanders)	5
Belgium (Ultratop 50 Wallonia)	2
Canada CHR (Nielsen BDS)	1
Croatia International Airplay (Top lista)	6
Denmark (Tracklisten)	4
Europe (Eurochart Hot 100)	2
France (SNEP)	1
Germany (GfK)	10
Greece (IFPI)	12
Hungary (Rádiós Top 40)	9
Hungary (Single Top 40)	16
Ireland (IRMA)	5
Italy (FIMI)	18
Netherlands (Dutch Top 40)	3
Netherlands (Single Top 100)	3
New Zealand (Recorded Music NZ)	2
Norway (VG-lista)	8
Poland (PiF PaF)	12
Scottish Singles Sales (Official Charts)	16
Sweden (Sverigetopplistan)	7
Switzerland (Schweizer Hitparade)	4
UK Singles (Official Charts)	8
UK Dance (Official Charts)	7
UK Hip Hop/R&B (Official Charts)	2
US Billboard Hot 100	1
US Hot R&B/Hip-Hop Songs (Billboard)	1
US Pop Airplay (Billboard)	1
US Rhythmic Airplay (Billboard)	1

2005 weekly chart performance for "Family Affair"
Chart (2005)	Peak position
Brazil Hot 100 Airplay (Billboard Brasil)	77

2022–2025 weekly chart performance for "Family Affair"
Chart (2022–2025)	Peak position
Canada Hot 100 (Billboard)	48
Global 200 (Billboard)	111
Romania Airplay (TopHit)	77

=== Year-end charts ===
2001 year-end chart performance for "Family Affair"
Chart (2001)	Position
Australia (ARIA)	98
Belgium (Ultratop 50 Flanders)	35
Belgium (Ultratop 50 Wallonia)	24
Canada Radio (Nielsen BDS)	52
Europe (Eurochart Hot 100)	12
France (SNEP)	14
Germany (Media Control)	70
Ireland (IRMA)	26
Netherlands (Dutch Top 40)	18
Netherlands (Single Top 100)	32
Sweden (Hitlistan)	35
Switzerland (Schweizer Hitparade)	9
UK Singles (OCC)	59
UK Urban (Music Week)	7
US Billboard Hot 100	31
US Hot R&B/Hip-Hop Singles & Tracks (Billboard)	17
US Mainstream Top 40 (Billboard)	76
US Rhythmic Top 40 (Billboard)	21

2002 year-end chart performance for "Family Affair"
Chart (2002)	Position
Australia (ARIA)	91
Canada (Nielsen SoundScan)	122
Canada Radio (Nielsen BDS)	43
Europe (Eurochart Hot 100)	82
New Zealand (RIANZ)	30
Switzerland (Schweizer Hitparade)	68
UK Airplay (Music Week)	64
US Billboard Hot 100	17
US Hot R&B/Hip-Hop Singles & Tracks (Billboard)	63
US Mainstream Top 40 (Billboard)	22
US Rhythmic Top 40 (Billboard)	32

2005 year-end chart performance for "Family Affair"
Chart (2005)	Position
Brazil Airplay (Crowley)	178

2024 year-end chart performance for "Family Affair"
Chart (2024)	Position
Romania Airplay (TopHit)	133

2025 year-end chart performance for "Family Affair"
Chart (2025)	Position
Romania Airplay (TopHit)	153

=== Decade-end charts ===
Decade-end chart performance for "Family Affair"
Chart (2000–2009)	Position
US Billboard Hot 100	12

=== All-time charts ===
All-time chart performance for "Family Affair"
Chart (1958–2018)	Position
US Billboard Hot 100	99

== Certifications ==
Certifications for "Family Affair"
Region	Certification	Certified units/sales
Australia (ARIA)	Platinum	70,000^{^}
Belgium (BRMA)	Gold	25,000^{*}
Brazil (Pro-Música Brasil)	Gold	30,000^{‡}
Denmark (IFPI Danmark)	Platinum	90,000^{‡}
France (SNEP)	Gold	250,000^{*}
Germany (BVMI)	Platinum	600,000^{‡}
Italy (FIMI)	Gold	50,000^{‡}
New Zealand (RMNZ) Physical sales	Gold	5,000^{*}
New Zealand (RMNZ) Digital sales + streaming	4× Platinum	120,000^{‡}
Sweden (GLF)	Gold	15,000^{^}
Switzerland (IFPI Switzerland)	Platinum	40,000^{^}
United Kingdom (BPI)	2× Platinum	1,200,000^{‡}
^{*} Sales figures based on certification alone.^{^} Shipments figures based on certification alone.^{‡} Sales+streaming figures based on certification alone.

== Release history ==
Release dates and formats for "Family Affair"
Region	Date	Format(s)	Label(s)	Ref.
United States	July 24, 2001	Rhythmic contemporary; urban radio	MCA	
Australia	August 6, 2001	CD	MCA	
Japan	August 18, 2001	CD	MCA	
United States	September 11, 2001	Contemporary hit radio	MCA	
United Kingdom	September 24, 2001	12-inch vinyl; CD; cassette	MCA	
