= Kipper (musician) =

British musician with Gary Numan and Sting

Mark Eldridge, better known by the stage name Kipper, is a British Grammy Award-winning guitarist, keyboardist and record producer, known mostly from his collaborations with Gary Numan and Sting.

Kipper had his own band, One Nation. After releasing two albums with One Nation he joined the Gary Numan band playing guitar.

After realizing his own music was going in a similar direction as Kipper's previous work, Numan asked him to co-produce his 1992 LP Machine and Soul. The album was a mix of funk, rock and dance pop featuring guitar playing from Kipper. Kipper also contributed to Numan's 1994 album Sacrifice although to a much lesser extent.

Years later, Kipper helped produce and played keyboards on Sting's studio albums Brand New Day and Sacred Love. Both albums have been critically acclaimed and feature a modern fusion of jazz, rock, and electronic sounds.

== Discography ==
- Strong Enough (One Nation) (1990)
- Big Life, Big Tears (One Nation) (1991)
- Machine and Soul (Gary Numan) (1992)
- Dream Corrosion (Gary Numan) (1993)
- Sacrifice (Gary Numan) (1994)
- Dark Light (Gary Numan) (1995)
- Brand New Day (Sting) (1999)
- ...All This Time (Sting) (2001)
- Night Sessions (Chris Botti) (2001)
- Sacred Love (Sting) (2003)
- Inside the Songs of Sacred Love (Sting) (2004)
- On My Way Here (Clay Aiken) (2008)
- This is Different (for Bang & Olufsen) (2006)
- Love Eternally (Ewing) (2012)
