= Sting discography =

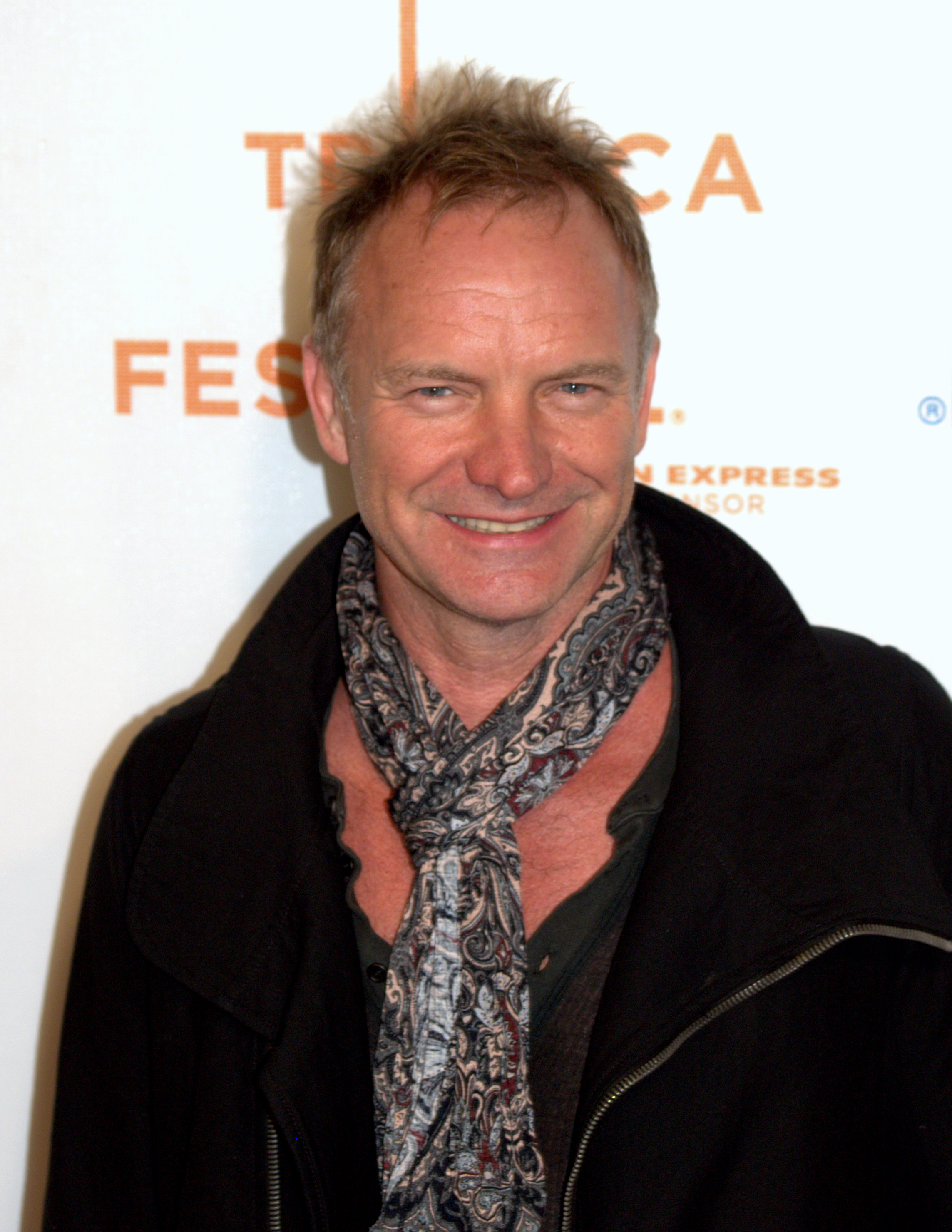
- Sting at the premiere of Moon, 2009
- Studio albums: 15
- Extended plays: 5
- Soundtrack albums: 7
- Live albums: 6
- Compilation albums: 7
- Singles: 51
- Music videos: 57
- Guest appearances: 1

The discography of British singer Sting. Born Gordon Sumner in 1951, he was a member of the jazz group Last Exit, who released a cassette album in 1975. With The Police (1977–1986, occasional reunions thereafter), Sting sold over 100 million records and singles. As a solo performer, he has released 15 albums between 1985 and 2021, most of which have sold millions of copies worldwide.

== Albums ==
=== Studio albums ===
Title	Album details	Peak chart positions										Certifications (sales thresholds)
Title	Album details	UK	AUS	AUT	FRA	GER	NLD	NOR	SWE	SWI	US	Certifications (sales thresholds)
The Dream of the Blue Turtles	Released: 17 June 1985; Label: A&M	3	1	13	4	4	1	4	5	6	2	BPI: 2× Platinum; FRA: Platinum; GER: Platinum; US: 3× Platinum
...Nothing Like the Sun	Released: 16 October 1987; Label: A&M	1	3	3	3	4	3	2	7	3	9	BPI: Platinum; FRA: 2× Platinum; GER: Platinum; NLD: 2× Platinum; SWI: 2× Platinum; US: 2× Platinum
The Soul Cages	Released: 21 January 1991; Label: A&M	1	3	3	7	1	1	2	4	1	2	AUS: Gold; AUT: Gold; BPI: Gold; FRA: Platinum; GER: Platinum; SWI: Platinum; US: Platinum
Ten Summoner's Tales	Released: 1 March 1993; Label: A&M	2	9	1	2	2	5	3	10	3	2	AUS: Platinum; BPI: 2× Platinum; FRA: 2× Gold; GER: Gold; NLD: Gold; SWI: Platinum; US: 3× Platinum
Mercury Falling	Released: 4 March 1996; Label: A&M	4	14	1	35	2	3	4	2	1	5	AUS: Gold; AUT: Gold; BPI: Platinum; GER: Gold; NLD: Gold; SWI: Gold; US: Platinum
Brand New Day	Released: 27 September 1999; Label: A&M	5	21	1	3	1	7	1	4	2	9	AUS: Platinum; AUT: Gold; BPI: Platinum; FRA: 2× Gold; GER: Gold; NLD: Gold; NOR: Gold; SWI: Platinum; US: 3× Platinum
Sacred Love	Released: 30 September 2003; Label: A&M	3	13	2	5	2	3	3	3	1	3	BPI: Gold; FRA: Gold; GER: Gold; NLD: Gold; SWI: Platinum; US: Platinum
Songs from the Labyrinth	Released: 10 October 2006; Label: Deutsche Grammophon	24	—	40	20	11	39	—	30	31	25	GER: Gold
If on a Winter's Night...	Released: 27 October 2009; Label: Deutsche Grammophon	15	58	12	8	5	10	18	12	13	6	BPI: Silver; FRA: Gold; GER: Gold; SWI: Platinum; US: Gold
Symphonicities	Released: 13 July 2010; Label: Deutsche Grammophon	30	24	19	10	7	22	—	30	15	6	
The Last Ship	Released: 24 September 2013; Label: Cherrytree, Interscope, A&M	14	39	8	10	3	6	3	12	9	13	
57th & 9th	Released: 11 November 2016; Label: Cherrytree, Interscope, A&M	15	9	6	5	3	7	—	6	3	9	
My Songs	Released: 24 May 2019; Label: A&M	27	— (Note: My Songs did not enter the ARIA Albums Chart, but peaked at number nine on the ARIA Digital Album Chart.)	7	2	4	39	—	—	5	145	FRA: Platinum
The Bridge	Released: 19 November 2021; Label: A&M	27	64	7	14	5	27	—	—	5	101	

=== Collaboration albums ===
Title	Album details	Peak chart positions								Certifications (sales thresholds)
Title	Album details	UK	AUS	AUT	FRA	GER	NLD	SWI	US	Certifications (sales thresholds)
44/876 (with Shaggy)	Released: 20 April 2018; Label: A&M	9	38	6	2	1	16	5	40	FRA: Gold

=== Live albums ===
Title	Album details	Peak chart positions										Certifications
Title	Album details	UK	AUS	AUT	FRA	GER	NLD	NOR	SWE	SWI	US	Certifications
Bring On the Night	Released: 20 June 1986; Label: A&M	16	9	9	—	10	2	19	28	11	—	BPI: Silver
Acoustic Live in Newcastle	Released: 11 November 1991; Label: A&M	—	—	—	—	—	—	—	—	—	—	
...All This Time	Released: 5 November 2001; Label: A&M	3	68	10	7	5	12	17	29	10	32	AUS: Gold; AUT: Gold; BPI: Platinum; FRA: Gold; GER: Gold; NLD: Gold; SWI: Gold; US: Gold
The Journey and the Labyrinth	Released: 2007; Label: Deutsche Grammophon	—	—	—	—	—	—	—	—	—	—	
Live in Berlin	Released: 26 November 2010; Label: Deutsche Grammophon	180	—	22	79	13	37	40	—	51	—	GER: Gold
Live at the Olympia Paris	Released: 10 November 2017; Label: Eagle Rock Entertainment	—	—	—	—	77	4	—	—	1	—	FRA: Gold
3.0 Live	Released: 25 April 2025; Label: A&M	—	—	25	82	—	—	—	—	18	—	
The Night Watch: Live at the Rijksmuseum	Released 26 June 2026; Label: Cherrytree/A&M/Interscope	—	—	15	120	11	29	— (Note: The Night Watch (Live at the Rijksmuseum) did not enter the Norwegian Top 100 Albums chart, but peaked at number 10 on the Norwegian Physical Albums chart.)	—	34	—	
"—" denotes releases that did not chart or not released to that country

=== Compilation albums ===
Title	Album details	Peak chart positions									Certifications
Title	Album details	UK	AUS	AUT	GER	NLD	NOR	SWE	SWI	US	Certifications
Fields of Gold: The Best of Sting 1984–1994	Released: 7 November 1994; Label: A&M	2	20	7	4	5	5	5	5	7	AUT: Gold; BPI: 3× Platinum; FRA: Platinum; GER: Platinum; NLD: Platinum; SWE: Gold; SWI: Platinum; US: 2× Platinum
The Very Best of Sting & The Police	Released: 3 November 1997; Label: A&M	11	22	4	18	17	—	26	17	—	AUS: Gold; AUT: Gold; GER: Gold; SWI: Gold
The Very Best of Sting & The Police (updated)	Released: February 2002; Label: A&M	1	—	—	—	—	59	69	17	46	UK: 5× Platinum; US: Gold
Songs of Love	Released: 2003; Label: A&M/Universal Special Markets	—	—	—	—	—	—	—	—	—	US: Platinum
25 Years (3CD + 1DVD)	Released: 26 September 2011; Label: A&M	—	—	—	—	—	—	—	—	—	
The Best of 25 Years	Released: 24 October 2011; Label: A&M	27	—	29	32	16	4	13	50	104	
Duets	Released: 19 March 2021; Label: A&M	17	—	5	2	9	—	—	7	—	
"—" denotes releases that did not chart or not released to that country

== Extended plays ==
Title	EP details	Peak chart positions			
Title	EP details	UK	AUS	SWI	US
Nada como el sol	Released: 16 February 1988; Label: A&M	—	—	18	—
Demolition Man	Released: 21 September 1993; Label: A&M	21	71	—	162
Five Live	Released: 1994; Label: A&M; Exclusive Australian release	—	—	—	—
Live at TFI Friday EP	Released: 14 June 1996; Label: A&M	53	—	—	—
Still Be Love in the World	Released: 1 March 2001; Label: A&M; Format: Digital download, CD (sold exclusively in US Target stores for a limited time)	—	—	—	—

== Singles ==
=== As lead artist ===
==== 1980s ====
Title	Year	Peak chart positions										Certifications	Album
Title	Year	UK	AUS	CAN	FRA	GER	ITA	IRE	NLD	SWI	US	Certifications	Album
"Spread a Little Happiness"	1982	16	80	—	—	—	—	16	—	—	—		Brimstone & Treacle soundtrack
"If You Love Somebody Set Them Free"	1985	26	18	5	23	—	3	15	38	—	3	MC: Gold	The Dream of the Blue Turtles
"Love Is the Seventh Wave"	1985	41	57	38	30	—	—	25	10	—	17		The Dream of the Blue Turtles
"Fortress Around Your Heart"	1985	49	72	20	—	—	—	—	26	—	8		The Dream of the Blue Turtles
"Russians"	1985	12	11	35	2	4	1	11	8	13	16		The Dream of the Blue Turtles
"Moon over Bourbon Street"	1986	44	—	—	—	—	—	—	—	—	—		The Dream of the Blue Turtles
"We Work the Black Seam" (Note: released in Germany, Australia and New Zealand)	1986	—	—	—	—	—	—	—	—	—	—		The Dream of the Blue Turtles
"We'll Be Together"	1987	41	13	9	46	—	4	14	33	—	7		...Nothing Like the Sun
"Be Still My Beating Heart"	1988	—	94	22	—	—	—	—	—	—	15		...Nothing Like the Sun
"Englishman in New York"	1988	51	—	60	30	—	—	12	13	—	84	BPI: Gold	...Nothing Like the Sun
"Fragile"	1988	70	—	—	39	—	16	—	12	—	—		...Nothing Like the Sun
"They Dance Alone"	1988	94	—	—	—	66	24	—	27	—	—		...Nothing Like the Sun
"—" denotes a recording that did not chart or was not released in that territory.

==== 1990s ====
Title	Year	Peak chart positions										Certifications	Album
Title	Year	UK	AUS	CAN	FRA	GER	ITA	IRE	NLD	SWI	US	Certifications	Album
"Englishman in New York" (The Ben Liebrand Mix)	1990	15	156	—	—	20	—	—	60	—	—		non-album
"All This Time"	1990	22	26	1	21	23	4	13	22	18	5		The Soul Cages
"Mad About You"	1991	56	109	71	—	59	13	—	44	—	—		The Soul Cages
"The Soul Cages"	1991	57	135	47	—	—	—	—	77	—	—		The Soul Cages
"Why Should I Cry for You"	1991	—	—	46	38	—	—	—	—	—	—		The Soul Cages
"It's Probably Me" (with Eric Clapton)	1992	30	23	12	4	22	2	17	7	16	—		Lethal Weapon 3 soundtrack
"If I Ever Lose My Faith in You"	1993	14	41	1	39	31	2	28	30	16	17		Ten Summoner's Tales
"Seven Days"	1993	25	119	—	—	—	18	—	—	—	—		Ten Summoner's Tales
"She's Too Good for Me" (Note: released in France)	1993	—	—	—	—	—	—	—	—	—	—		Ten Summoner's Tales
"Fields of Gold"	1993	16	85	2	—	52	—	22	44	25	23	BPI: Gold; BVMI: Gold; FIMI: Gold; IFPI: Gold	Ten Summoner's Tales
"Shape of My Heart"	1993	57	—	44	—	—	—	—	—	—	—	BPI: Silver	Ten Summoner's Tales
"Love Is Stronger Than Justice (The Munificent Seven)" (Note: released in some European countries)	1993	—	—	—	—	75	—	—	—	—	—		Ten Summoner's Tales
"Nothing 'Bout Me"	1993	32	—	10	—	—	—	—	41	—	57		Ten Summoner's Tales
"All for Love" (with Bryan Adams & Rod Stewart)	1993	2	1	1	7	1	1	1	3	1	1	BPI: Silver	The Three Musketeers soundtrack
"When We Dance"	1994	9	110	10	—	51	11	9	32	42	38		Fields of Gold: The Best of Sting 1984–1994
"This Cowboy Song"	1995	15	88	34	—	51	—	19	48	—	—		Fields of Gold: The Best of Sting 1984–1994
"Let Your Soul Be Your Pilot"	1996	15	65	7	—	58	17	—	43	—	86		Mercury Falling
"You Still Touch Me"	1996	27	—	7	—	—	—	—	—	—	60		Mercury Falling
"I Was Brought to My Senses"	1996	31	133	—	—	—	—	—	—	—	—		Mercury Falling
"I'm So Happy I Can't Stop Crying"	1996	54	133	27	—	74	—	—	—	—	94		Mercury Falling
"Roxanne '97" (Sting & The Police)	1997	17	—	—	—	—	9	—	69	—	59		The Very Best of Sting & The Police
"Brand New Day"	1999	13	—	31	73	54	5	—	46	35	103		Brand New Day
"—" denotes a recording that did not chart or was not released in that territory.

==== 2000s ====
Title	Year	Peak chart positions										Certifications	Album
Title	Year	UK	AUS	BEL (WA)	FRA	GER	ITA	IRE	NLD	SWI	US	Certifications	Album
"Desert Rose" (with Cheb Mami)	2000	15	67	7	6	7	4	27	29	3	17	BPI: Silver	Brand New Day
"After the Rain Has Fallen"	2000	31	—	—	89	64	16	46	—	—	—		Brand New Day
"My Funny Friend and Me" (European-only release)	2000	—	—	—	—	—	41	—	—	91	—		The Emperor's New Groove soundtrack
"Fragile (2001)"	2001	—	—	—	—	92	25	—	75	64	—		...All This Time
"Send Your Love" (featuring Vicente Amigo)	2003	30	44	53	—	24	8	—	43	37	—		Sacred Love
"Whenever I Say Your Name" (with Mary J. Blige)	2003	60	—	56	—	—	—	—	60	50	—		Sacred Love
"Stolen Car (Take Me Dancing)"	2004	60	—	—	—	54	46	—	—	81	—		Sacred Love
"Soul Cake"	2009	—	—	40	—	—	30	—	—	—	—		If on a Winter's Night...
"—" denotes a recording that did not chart or was not released in that territory.

==== 2010s ====
Title	Year	Peak chart positions				Album
Title	Year	BEL (WA)	FRA	ITA	US AAA	Album
"Every Little Thing She Does Is Magic" (London '10 Version)	2010	—	—	—	—	Symphonicities
"Deep in the Meadow (Lullaby)"	2012	—	—	—	—	The Hunger Games: Songs from District 12 and Beyond (Released as a single, and as a bonus download upon purchasing the album)
"Practical Arrangement"	2013	92	—	—	—	The Last Ship
"And Yet"	2013	—	—	—	—	The Last Ship
"I Can't Stop Thinking About You"	2016	60	52	—	2	57th & 9th
"One Fine Day"	2016	—	—	—	21	57th & 9th
"Don't Make Me Wait" (with Shaggy)	2018	—	—	99	29	44/876
"Gotta Get Back My Baby" (with Shaggy featuring Maître Gims)	2018	—	—	—	—	44/876
"Just One Lifetime" (with Shaggy)	2019	—	—	—	—	44/876
"Silent Night (Christmas Is Coming)" (with Shaggy)	2019	—	—	—	—	non-album
"2 in a Million" (with Steve Aoki and Shaed)	2019	—	—	—	—	Neon Future IV
"—" denotes a recording that did not chart or was not released in that territory.

==== 2020s ====
Title	Year	Peak chart positions						Album
Title	Year	US AAA	BEL (WA)	CAN	GER	NLD	UK	Album
"My Funny Valentine" (with Herbie Hancock)	2021	—	—	—	—	—	—	Duets
"Englishman/African in New York" (with Shirazee)	2021	—	—	—	—	—	—	Duets
"If It's Love"	2021	—	—	—	—	—	—	The Bridge
"Rushing Water"	2021	12	—	—	—	—	—	The Bridge
"What Could Have Been" (with Ray Chen)	2021	—	—	—	—	—	—	Arcane (Soundtrack)
"Redlight" (with Swedish House Mafia)	2022	—	—	—	—	—	—	Paradise Again
"Dreaming" (with Pink and Marshmello)	2023	—	22	64	93	50	99	Trustfall: Tour Deluxe Edition
"—" denotes a recording that did not chart or was not released in that territory.

=== As featured artist ===
Title	Year	Peak chart positions									Certifications	Album
Title	Year	UK	AUS	FRA	GER	IRE	ITA	NLD	SWI	US	Certifications	Album
"Fragile" (Julio Iglesias featuring Sting)	1994	53	—	—	—	—	—	—	—	—		Crazy
"Spirits in the Material World" (Pato Banton featuring Sting)	1996	36	—	—	68	—	—	—	—	—		Ace Ventura
"On Silent Wings" (Tina Turner featuring Sting)	1996	13	—	—	55	—	—	37	—	—		Wildest Dreams
"I'm So Happy I Can't Stop Crying" (Toby Keith featuring Sting)	1997	—	—	—	—	—	—	—	—	84		Dream Walkin'
"Invisible Sun" (Sting & Aswad) (German-only release)	1998	—	—	—	75	—	—	—	—	—		The X-Files: The Album
"Terre d'oru (Fields of Gold)" (I Muvrini featuring Sting) (France-only release)	1998	—	—	36	—	—	—	93	—	—		non-album
"Rise & Fall" (Craig David featuring Sting)	2003	2	6	15	15	5	9	7	11	—		Slicker Than Your Average
"Lullaby to an Anxious Child" (Gregg Kofi Brown featuring Sting)	2005	—	—	—	—	—	—	—	—	—		Together as One
"Always on Your Side" (Sheryl Crow featuring Sting)	2006	—	—	—	—	—	—	—	—	33		Wildflower
"Stolen Car" (Mylène Farmer featuring Sting)	2015	—	—	1	—	—	—	—	55	—		Interstellaires
"Reste" (Gims featuring Sting)	2019	—	—	16	—	—	—	—	—	—	FRA: Platinum	Ceinture noire
"In the City" (Charly García featuring Sting)	2025	—	—	—	—	—	—	—	—	—		non-album
"Estrellitas y Duendes" (Juan Luis Guerra featuring Sting)	2025	—	—	—	—	—	—	—	—	—		non-album
"Til A Mawnin" (Shaggy featuring Sting)	2025	—	—	—	—	—	—	—	—	—		Lottery
"Ain't No Sunshine" (Shaggy featuring Sting)	2026	—	—	—	—	—	—	—	—	—		Lottery
"Hasta Jesús tuvo un mal día" (Ca7riel & Paco Amoroso featuring Sting)	2026	—	—	—	—	—	—	—	—	—		non-album
"—" denotes a recording that did not chart or was not released in that territory.

== Other appearances ==
Title	Year	Album
Multiple tracks	1982	Brimstone & Treacle: Original Soundtrack Album
"Adventures in Success" (co-writer)	1983	Will Powers's Dancing for Mental Health
"Money for Nothing" (backing vocals)	1985	Dire Straits' Brothers in Arms
"The Promise" (backing vocals)	1985	Arcadia's So Red the Rose
"Long Long Way to Go" "Take Me Home" (backing vocals)	1985	Phil Collins' No Jacket Required
"One Phone Call" (French policeman's voice)	1985	Miles Davis' You're Under Arrest
Multiple tracks	1986	Eberhard Schoener's "Music from 'Video Magic' & 'Flashback'"
"I Been Down So Long"	1986	Live! For Life (limited-release charity album)
"Someone to Watch Over Me"	1987	Someone to Watch Over Me soundtrack
"Gabriel's Message"	1987	A Very Special Christmas
The Soldier's Tale (Igor Stravinsky) - The Soldier	1988	The Soldier's Tale - Histoire Du Soldat - Geschichte Vom Soldaten (with Ian McKellen and Vanessa Redgrave)
"Murder by Numbers"	1989	Broadway the Hard Way by Frank Zappa
"Charming Snakes"(bass)	1990	Charming Snakes by Andy Summers
"Cushie Butterfield"	1991	Disney compilation album For Our Children
"Come Down in Time"	1991	Two Rooms: Celebrating the Songs of Elton John & Bernie Taupin
"Muoio per te" "It's Probably Me" "Panus Angelicus"	1992	Luciano Pavarotti's Pavarotti & Friends
Prokofiev: Peter and the Wolf (narration)	1992	Claudio Abbado and the Chamber Orchestra of Europe's; Prokofiev's Peter and the Wolf and other works
"Sister Moon" (backing vocals)	1994	Vanessa Williams' The Sweetest Days
"Russians" (live version)	1994	Grammy's Greatest Moments Volume I
"Someone to Watch Over Me" (live version)	1994	Grammy's Greatest Moments Volume IV
"Moonlight"	1995	Sabrina: Original Motion Picture Soundtrack
"Angel Eyes" "My One and Only Love" "It's a Lonesome Old Town"	1995	Leaving Las Vegas: Original Motion Picture Soundtrack
"Mo Ghile Mear" (Our Hero)	1995	The Chieftains's album The Long Black Veil
"Sisters of Mercy" (with The Chieftains)	1995	Tower of Song: The Songs of Leonard Cohen
"This Was Never Meant to Be"	1995	Gentlemen Don't Eat Poets: Original Motion Picture Soundtrack
"It Ain't Necessarily So"	1997	Joe Henderson's Porgy & Bess
"I Saw Three Ships"	1997	A Very Special Christmas 3
"Windmills of Your Mind"	1999	The Thomas Crown Affair: Music From The MGM Motion Picture
"Ain't No Sunshine"	1999	David Sanborn's Inside
"Another Pyramid"	1999	Elton John and Tim Rice's Aida
"'Round Midnight"	1999	Andy Summers' Green Chimneys: The Music of Thelonious Monk
"In the Wee Small Hours of the Morning"	1999	Chris Botti's Slowing Down the World
"Don't Walk Away"	2000	Youssou N'Dour's Joko – From Village to Town
"My Funny Friend and Me"	2000	The Emperor's New Groove: An Original Walt Disney Records Soundtrack
"Searching for the Holy Grail" (backing vocals)	2000	Danny Paradise's River of the Soul
"She Walks This Earth (Soberana Rosa)"	2000	Various Artists' A Love Affair: Music of Ivan Lins
"Seventh Son"	2001	Jools Holland's Small World Big Band
"Until..."	2001	Kate & Leopold: Music from the Miramax Motion Picture
"Fragile" (live version)	2001	America: A Tribute to Heroes
"Le rai c'est chic"	2001	Cheb Mami's Dellali
"Fill Her Up"	2001	Earl Scruggs' Earl Scruggs and Friends
"Mad About You"	2001	George Dalaras' The Running Roads
"People"	2002	Jimmy Cliff's Fantastic Plastic People
"Sail On, Sailor"	2002	Lulu's Together
"Shape of My Heart" "Ave Maria"	2003	Dominic Miller's Shapes
"You Will Be My Ain True Love" (with Alison Krauss)	2003	Cold Mountain: Music from the Miramax Motion Picture
"Shape" (backing vocals)	2003	Sugababes' Angels with Dirty Faces
"The Wind Cries Mary"	2004	Power of Soul: A Tribute to Jimi Hendrix
"We'll Be Together" (with Annie Lennox)	2004	Bridget Jones: The Edge of Reason - The Original Soundtrack
"La belle dame sans regrets" (with Dominic Miller)	2004	Chris Botti's When I Fall in Love
"People"	2004	Jimmy Cliff's Black Magic
"Gonna Be Some Changes Made" "Halcyon Days"	2004	Bruce Hornsby's Halcyon Days
"A Thousand Years" (with Mariza)	2004	Unity: The Official Athens 2004 Olympic Games Album
"Muoio Per Te"	2004	Zucchero's Zu & Co.
"Taking the Inside Rail"	2005	Racing Stripes: Original Motion Picture Soundtrack
"Sister Moon"	2005	Herbie Hancock's Possibilities
"Moon Over Bourbon Street" (live version with Chris Botti)	2005	Hurricane Relief: Come Together Now
"Union"	2005	The Black Eyed Peas' Monkey Business
"Love Sneakin' Up On You" (with Joss Stone)	2005	Les Paul & Friends' American Made World Played
"Until..."	2005	Brodsky Quartet's Moodswings
"Friend or Foe"	2005	t.A.T.u.'s Dangerous and Moving
"The Boulevard of Broken Dreams"	2006	Tony Bennett's Duets: An American Classic
"None of Us Are Free" (with Sheila E.)	2006	Sam Moore's Overnight Sensational
"Prologue of Dionysos" "Unfailing Welcome to the Voice" "To Be Is Strong" "The Desire of Dionysos" "Distanciation" "The Unlikely Duet"	2007	Steve Nieve and Muriel Teodori: Welcome to the Voice (with Barbara Bonney, Robert Wyatt, Elvis Costello, Brodsky Quartet)
"Sea Dreamer"	2007	Anoushka Shankar/Karsh Kale's Breathing Under Water
"What Are You Doing the Rest of Your Life?"	2008	Chris Botti's To Love Again: The Duets
"L'amour c'est comme un jour" "Love Is New Everyday"	2009	Charles Aznavour's Duos
"Come Again"	2009	Joshua Bell's At Home with Friends
"Seven Days" (live version) "If I Ever Lose My Faith in You" (live version) "Shape of My Heart" (live version)	2009	Chris Botti in Boston
"Alone with My Thoughts This Evening"	2009	Edin Karamazov's The Lute Is a Song
"Higher Ground/Roxanne" (with Stevie Wonder) "People Get Ready" (with Jeff Beck)	2009	Rock and Roll Hall of Fame 25th Anniversary Concert album
"Power's Out"	2011	Nicole Scherzinger's Killer Love
"Let Your Soul Be Your Pilot"	2011	Matthew Morrison's self-titled album
"Catch Tomorrow"	2014	Afrojack's Forget the World
"Lonesome Day"	2014	A MusiCares Tribute to Bruce Springsteen (DVD)
"Killing You"	2015	Ivy Levan's No Good
"Simple"	2020	Ricky Martin's Pausa
"Little Something"	2020	Melody Gardot's Sunset in the Blue
"Every Breath You Take" (with Dolly Parton)	2023	Dolly Parton's Rockstar

== Videography ==
=== Music videos ===
Year	Title	Album
1982	"Spread a Little Happiness"	Brimstone & Treacle soundtrack
1985	"If You Love Somebody Set Them Free"	The Dream of the Blue Turtles
1985	"Love Is the Seventh Wave"	The Dream of the Blue Turtles
1985	"Fortress Around Your Heart"	The Dream of the Blue Turtles
1985	"Russians"	The Dream of the Blue Turtles
1986	"Bring On the Night" (live version)	Bring On the Night
1987	"We'll Be Together"	...Nothing Like the Sun
1987	"Be Still Beating My Heart"	...Nothing Like the Sun
1987	"Gabriel's Message"	A Very Special Christmas
1988	"Englishman in New York"	...Nothing Like the Sun
1988	"Fragile"	...Nothing Like the Sun
1988	"They Dance Alone (Cueca Solo)"	...Nothing Like the Sun
1991	"All This Time"	The Soul Cages
1991	"Mad About You"	The Soul Cages
1991	"The Soul Cages"	The Soul Cages
1991	"Why Should I Cry for You"	The Soul Cages
1991	"Muoio per te" (with Zucchero)	non-album
1992	"It's Probably Me" (with Eric Clapton)	Lethal Weapon 3 soundtrack
1993	"If I Ever Lose My Faith in You"	Ten Summoner's Tales
1993	"Seven Days"	Ten Summoner's Tales
1993	"Fields of Gold"	Ten Summoner's Tales
1993	"Shape of My Heart"	Ten Summoner's Tales
1993	"Love Is Stronger Than Justice (The Munificent Seven)"	Ten Summoner's Tales
1993	"Demolition Man"	Demolition Man
1993	"All for Love" (with Bryan Adams and Rod Stewart)	The Three Musketeers soundtrack
1994	"When We Dance"	Fields of Gold: The Best of Sting 1984–1994
1994	"This Cowboy Song"	Fields of Gold: The Best of Sting 1984–1994
1995	"Moonlight"	Sabrina soundtrack
1995	"Spirits in the Material World" (with Pato Banton)	Ace Ventura: When Nature Calls soundtrack
1996	"Let Your Soul Be Your Pilot"	Mercury Falling
1996	"You Still Touch Me"	Mercury Falling
1996	"I'm So Happy I Can't Stop Crying"	Mercury Falling
1997	"Roxanne '97" (with Pras)	The Very Best of Sting & The Police
1998	"The Mighty"	The Mighty soundtrack
1999	"Brand New Day"	Brand New Day
1999	"Desert Rose" (with Cheb Mami)	Brand New Day
2000	"After the Rain Has Fallen"	Brand New Day
2000	"My Funny Friend and Me"	The Emperor's New Groove soundtrack
2001	"Fragile (2001)"	...All This Time
2001	"Until"	Kate & Leopold soundtrack
2003	"Send Your Love" (Dave Audé remix)	Sacred Love
2003	"Whenever I Say Your Name" (with Mary J. Blige)	Sacred Love
2004	"Stolen Car (Take Me Dancing)"	Sacred Love
2016	"I Can't Stop Thinking About You"	57th & 9th
2018	"Don't Make Me Wait" (with Shaggy)	44/876
2019	"Just One Lifetime" (with Shaggy)	44/876
2020	"September" (with Zucchero)	Duets
2021	"If It's Love"	The Bridge
2021	"Rushing Water"	The Bridge
2024	"I Wrote Your Name (Upon My Heart)"	non-album

=== Collaborations in music videos ===
Year	Title	Other Performer	Album
2003	"Rise & Fall"	Craig David	Slicker Than Your Average
2006	"Always on Your Side"	Sheryl Crow	Wildflower
2015	"Stolen Car"	Mylène Farmer	Interstellaires
2022	"Redlight"	Swedish House Mafia	non-album
2024	"Undefeated Eyes"	Fantastic Negrito	non-album
2025	"In the City"	Charly García	non-album
2025	"Estrellitas y Duendes"	Juan Luis Guerra	non-album
