= The Best of 25 Years =

Compilation album by Sting
- Released: 24 October 2011
- Label: A&M
- Producer: Rob Mathes

Sting chronology
25 Years (2011)	The Best of 25 Years (2011)	The Last Ship (2013)

The Best of 25 Years is a compilation album by English musician Sting. It was released on 24 October 2011 through A&M Records.

== Track listing ==
Standard Edition
No.	Title	Length
1.	"If You Love Somebody Set Them Free" (2011 Remix)	4:24
2.	"Englishman in New York"	4:25
3.	"We'll Be Together" (2011 Remix)	4:46
4.	"Fragile"	3:54
5.	"All This Time"	4:55
6.	"If I Ever Lose My Faith in You"	4:28
7.	"Fields of Gold"	3:40
8.	"Desert Rose"	4:50
9.	"Whenever I Say Your Name" (featuring Mary J. Blige)	5:24
10.	"Never Coming Home" (2011 Mix)	5:20
11.	"Message in a Bottle" (Live at Irving Plaza, 2011 Remix)	4:48
12.	"Demolition Man" (Live at Irving Plaza, 2011 Remix)	4:25
13.	"Heavy Cloud No Rain" (Live at Irving Plaza, 2011 Remix)	3:45

Note: The US version doesn't contain the song "Englishman in New York".

Bonus Tracks Edition – CD 1
No.	Title	Length
1.	"If You Love Somebody Set Them Free" (2011 Remix)	4:24
2.	"Love Is the Seventh Wave" (2011 Remix)	3:33
3.	"Moon over Bourbon Street" (2011 Remix)	4:01
4.	"Fortress Around Your Heart" (2011 Remix)	4:52
5.	"Englishman In New York"	4:26
6.	"They Dance Alone (Cueca Solo)"	7:13
7.	"Fragile"	3:54
8.	"We'll Be Together" (2011 Remix)	4:46
9.	"All This Time"	4:55
10.	"Mad About You"	3:54
11.	"Why Should I Cry For You"	4:46
12.	"The Soul Cages"	5:52
13.	"If I Ever Lose My Faith in You"	4:28
14.	"Fields of Gold"	3:39
15.	"Seven Days"	4:39
16.	"Shape of My Heart"	4:37

Bonus Tracks Edition – CD 2
No.	Title	Length
1.	"When We Dance"	5:59
2.	"I Was Brought to My Senses"	5:49
3.	"You Still Touch Me"	3:47
4.	"I'm So Happy I Can't Stop Crying"	3:58
5.	"Desert Rose"	4:51
6.	"Brand New Day"	6:20
7.	"Send Your Love" (Dave Audé Remix Edit Version)	3:15
8.	"Whenever I Say Your Name" (featuring Mary J. Blige)	5:24
9.	"Stolen Car (Take Me Dancing)"	3:56
10.	"The End of the Game"	6:07
11.	"Never Coming Home" (2011 Mix)	5:19
12.	"Russians" (Live in Berlin) (featuring The Royal Philharmonic Concert Orchestra and Steven Mercurio)	4:51
13.	"Message in a Bottle" (Live at Irving Plaza, 2011 Remix)	4:48
14.	"Demolition Man" (Live at Irving Plaza, 2011 Remix)	4:27
15.	"Heavy Cloud No Rain" (Live at Irving Plaza, 2011 Remix)	3:43

== Charts ==
=== Weekly charts ===
Chart (2011)	Peak position
Austrian Albums (Ö3 Austria)	29
Belgian Albums (Ultratop Flanders)	28
Belgian Albums (Ultratop Wallonia)	12
Dutch Albums (Album Top 100)	16
French Albums (SNEP)	59
German Albums (Offizielle Top 100)	32
Italian Albums (FIMI)	13
Norwegian Albums (VG-lista)	4
Polish Albums (ZPAV)	7
Portuguese Albums (AFP)	10
Spanish Albums (Promusicae)	46
Swedish Albums (Sverigetopplistan)	13
Swiss Albums (Schweizer Hitparade)	50
UK Albums (OCC)	27

Chart (2012)	Peak position
Hungarian Albums (MAHASZ)	15

Chart (2015)	Peak position
Polish Albums (ZPAV)	1

=== Year-end charts ===
Chart (2017)	Position
Polish Albums (ZPAV)	18

== Certifications ==
Region	Certification	Certified units/sales
Poland (ZPAV)	3× Platinum	60,000^{‡}
^{‡} Sales+streaming figures based on certification alone.
