= Live in Berlin (Sting album) =

Live album by Sting
- Released: 22 November 2010
- Recorded: 21 September 2010
- Venue: O2 World (Berlin)
- Genres: Rock, pop rock, jazz
- Length: 75:41 (CD); 122:10 (DVD/Blu-ray)
- Label: Deutsche Grammophon (Universal)
- Producers: Sting, Rob Mathes

Sting chronology
Symphonicities (2010)	Live in Berlin (2010)	The Last Ship (2013)

Professional ratings
Review scores
Source	Rating
AllMusic	3/5 stars

Sting ... Live in Berlin is a live album and concert film by Sting and the Royal Philharmonic Concert Orchestra. It was recorded and filmed on 21 September 2010 at the O_{2} World (as it had been known at the time) in Berlin. The concert features live versions of Sting's songs from The Police as well as his solo song catalogue. The length of the full concert is around 135 minutes, loosely spread across the DVD and CD, with some duplication.

== Track listing ==
=== DVD/Blu-ray ===
All songs written by Sting except where noted.

1. "A Thousand Years" (Kipper, Sting)
2. "Every Little Thing She Does Is Magic"
3. "Englishman in New York"
4. "Roxanne"
5. "When We Dance"
6. "Russians" (Sergei Prokofiev, Sting)
7. "I Hung My Head"
8. "Why Should I Cry For You"
9. "Whenever I Say Your Name"
10. "This Cowboy Song"
11. "Tomorrow We'll See"
12. "Moon Over Bourbon Street"
13. "The End of the Game"
14. "You Will Be My Ain True Love"
15. "All Would Envy"
16. "Mad About You"
17. "King of Pain"
18. "Every Breath You Take"
19. "Desert Rose"
20. "She's Too Good for Me"
21. "Fragile"
22. "I Was Brought to My Senses (Intro)"

=== CD ===
All songs written by Sting except where noted.

1. "If I Ever Lose My Faith in You" – 4:46
2. "Englishman in New York" – 4:38
3. "Fields of Gold" – 3:35
4. "Why Should I Cry For You" – 7:45
5. "All Would Envy" – 5:36
6. "Tomorrow We'll See" – 4:48
7. "The End of the Game" – 6:21
8. "Whenever I Say Your Name" – 7:21
9. "Shape of My Heart" (Sting, Dominic Miller) – 4:49
10. "Moon Over Bourbon Street" – 6:04
11. "Mad About You" – 4:45
12. "King of Pain" – 5:39
13. "Desert Rose" – 4:44
14. "Fragile" – 4:50

== Personnel ==
- Sting – vocals, guitar, composer, producer
- Royal Philharmonic Orchestra
- Dominic Miller – guitar
- Ira Coleman – bass
- Jo Lawry – vocals
- Rhani Krija - drums, percussion
- David Cossin - drums, percussion
- Branford Marsalis – saxophone
- Steven Mercurio – conductor, orchestration
- Jorge Calandrelli – orchestration
- David Hartley – orchestration
- Michel Legrand – orchestration
- Vince Mendoza – orchestration
- Rob Mathes – musical director, orchestration, producer
- Elliot Scheiner – mixing
- Thom Cadley – mixing
- Scott Hull – mastering

== Charts ==
Chart (2010)	Peak position
Austrian Albums (Ö3 Austria)	22
Belgian Albums (Ultratop Flanders)	81
Belgian Albums (Ultratop Wallonia)	55
Dutch Albums (Album Top 100)	37
French Albums (SNEP)	79
German Albums (Offizielle Top 100)	13
Italian Albums (FIMI)	16
New Zealand Albums (RMNZ)	7
Norwegian Albums (VG-lista)	40
Portuguese Albums (AFP)	10
Spanish Albums (Promusicae)	32
Swiss Albums (Schweizer Hitparade)	51
UK Albums (OCC)	180

== Certifications ==
Region	Certification	Certified units/sales
Australia (ARIA)	Platinum	15,000^{^}
Poland (ZPAV)	Platinum	20,000^{*}
^{*} Sales figures based on certification alone.^{^} Shipments figures based on certification alone.
