= All This Time (Sting album) =

...All This Time

Live album by Sting
- Released: 5 November 2001
- Recorded: 11 September 2001
- Venue: Villa Il Palagio, Italy
- Genre: Rock, pop rock, jazz
- Length: 61:41
- Label: A&M
- Producer: Sting, Kipper

Sting chronology
Brand New Day (1999)	...All This Time (2001)	Sacred Love (2003)

Singles from All This Time
- 1. "Fragile" Released: 1 November 2001

Professional ratings
Review scores
Source	Rating
AllMusic	4/5 stars
Jam!	(favorable)
Rolling Stone	3.5/5 stars

...All This Time is a live album and concert film by Sting, recorded and filmed on 11 September 2001. It was recorded at Sting's Villa Il Palagio in Italy in front of a select audience drawn from his fan club and features live versions of Sting's songs from his Police and solo song catalogue. The album and video get their name from the song of the same name from his album The Soul Cages. The concert documentary was directed by Jim Gable and the documentary portion was edited by Scott C. Wilson and Jeffrey Doe.

== Background ==
Sting wanted to put together a concert in his home at Villa Il Palagio in Tuscany, Italy, so he enlisted a group of musicians to practice and perform with him. The events leading up to the night of the performance were filmed, and during these events on the day of the performance, the September 11 attacks perpetrated against the United States occurred, and the assembled group of musicians was made aware of this. The group performed the concert as originally intended, although Sting indicated on the DVD documentary the tone of the evening was quite different from how it was originally intended. Additionally, the "Desert Rose" performance featuring vocalist Cheb Mami was canceled due to the same circumstances.

The album primarily consists of acoustic renditions of material in Sting's discography. Sting told Saga magazine that he was aiming for an "intimate feel" with the recordings for the purpose of attaining a "real atmosphere". Following the release of the album, Sting embarked on a tour consisting of over 250 shows.

Sting dedicated the concert to those who died on from the September 11 attacks. Inside the CD booklet, upon the first page, it is stated, "This album was recorded on September 11, 2001, and is respectfully dedicated to all those who lost their lives on that day." Thereafter, the lyrics for the included song "Fragile" are also transcribed; of the full song list comprising the CD, only the lyrics for this one song are within the booklet.

== CD track listing ==
All songs written by Sting, except where noted.

1. "Fragile" – 4:35
2. "A Thousand Years" (Kipper, Sting) – 3:01
3. "Perfect Love...Gone Wrong" - 4:11
4. "All This Time" – 5:20
5. "Seven Days" (Japan Bonus track) – 4:39
6. "The Hounds of Winter" – 4:29
7. "Mad About You" (excluded from US edition) – 3:37
8. "Don't Stand So Close to Me" – 2:15
9. "When We Dance" – 4:53
10. "Dienda" (Kenny Kirkland, Sting) – 3:14
11. "Roxanne" – 3:37
12. "If You Love Somebody Set Them Free" – 4:57
13. "Brand New Day" – 4:46
14. "Fields of Gold" – 3:50
15. "Moon over Bourbon Street" – 2:55
16. "Shape of My Heart" (Sting, Dominic Miller) (UK/Japan Bonus track) – 2:06
17. "If I Ever Lose My Faith in You" – 4:31
18. "Every Breath You Take" – 5:04

== DVD track listing ==
1. "Fragile"
2. "A Thousand Years"
3. "Perfect Love...Gone Wrong"
4. "All This Time"
5. "Seven Days"
6. "The Hounds of Winter"
7. "Don't Stand So Close to Me"
8. "When We Dance"
9. "Dienda"
10. "Roxanne"
11. "If You Love Somebody Set Them Free"
12. "Brand New Day"
13. "Fields of Gold"
14. "Moon Over Bourbon Street"
15. "Shape of My Heart"
16. "If I Ever Lose My Faith in You"
17. "Every Breath You Take"
- The DVD edition includes bonus performances of "Every Little Thing She Does Is Magic", "Fill Her Up", and "Englishman in New York". It also includes rehearsals and a behind-the-scenes documentary of the making of the CD.

== Personnel ==
- Sting – lead vocals, guitars, bass guitar
- Dominic Miller – guitars, backing vocals
- B. J. Cole – pedal steel guitar
- Christian McBride – acoustic bass
- Jaques Morelenbaum – cello
- Kipper – keyboards, programming
- Jason Rebello – acoustic piano
- Jeff Young – organ, backing vocals
- Manu Katché – drums
- Marcos Suzano – percussion
- Haoua Abdenacer – darbuka
- Clark Gayton – trombone
- Chris Botti – trumpet
- Katreese Barnes – backing vocals
- Janice Pendarvis – backing vocals

== Production ==
- Kipper – producer
- Sting – producer
- Martin Kierszenbaum – A&R
- Simon Osborne – recording, mixing
- Donal Hodgson – Pro-Tools, second engineer
- Peter "Hopps" Lorimer – assistant engineer
- Stefano Marchioni – assistant engineer
- Mixed at Fonoprint (Bologna, Italy)
- Chris Blair – mastering at Abbey Road Studios (London, UK)
- Tam Fairgrieve – production manager
- Richard Frankel – package design
- Danny Clinch – photography
- Kathryn Schenker – management

Additional credits

- James Bolton – stage manager
- Vidi Wash – monitor engineer
- Jim Ebdon – sound engineer
- Simon Bauer – sound technician
- Danny Quatrochi – bass technician
- Donny FitzSimmonds – drum technician
- Phil Docherty – guitar technician
- Peter "Hopps" Lorimer – keyboard technician

== Charts ==
=== Weekly charts ===
Weekly chart performance for All This Time
Chart (2001–2002)	Peak position
Australian Albums (ARIA)	68
Austrian Albums (Ö3 Austria)	10
Belgian Albums (Ultratop Flanders)	22
Belgian Albums (Ultratop Wallonia)	16
Canadian Albums (Billboard)	10
Danish Albums (Hitlisten)	29
Dutch Albums (Album Top 100)	12
Finnish Albums (Suomen virallinen lista)	22
French Albums (SNEP)	7
German Albums (Offizielle Top 100)	5
Hungarian Albums (MAHASZ)	13
Irish Albums (IRMA)	9
Italian Albums (FIMI)	4
New Zealand Albums (RMNZ)	21
Norwegian Albums (VG-lista)	17
Polish Albums (ZPAV)	3
Scottish Albums (OCC)	7
Swedish Albums (Sverigetopplistan)	29
Swiss Albums (Schweizer Hitparade)	10
UK Albums (OCC)	3
US Billboard 200	32

=== Year-end charts ===
2001 year-end chart performance for All This Time
Chart (2001)	Position
Canadian Albums (Nielsen SoundScan)	171
Dutch Albums (Album Top 100)	98
French Albums (SNEP)	71
Italian Albums (Musica e Dischi)	55
Swiss Albums (Schweizer Hitparade)	89
UK Albums (OCC)	68

2002 year-end chart performance for All This Time
Chart (2002)	Position
Dutch Albums (Album Top 100)	69
Italian Albums (Musica e Dischi)	98
US Billboard 200	107

== Certifications ==
Certifications and sales for All This Time
Region	Certification	Certified units/sales
Argentina (CAPIF) DVD	Platinum	8,000^{^}
Australia (ARIA)	Gold	35,000^{^}
Belgium (BRMA)	Gold	25,000^{*}
Canada (Music Canada)	Gold	50,000^{^}
France (SNEP)	Gold	100,000^{*}
Germany (BVMI)	Gold	150,000^{^}
Japan (RIAJ)	Gold	100,000^{^}
Netherlands (NVPI)	Gold	40,000^{^}
New Zealand (RMNZ)	Gold	7,500^{^}
New Zealand (RMNZ) DVD	Platinum	5,000^{^}
Poland (ZPAV)	Gold	35,000^{*}
Spain (Promusicae)	Platinum	100,000^{^}
Switzerland (IFPI Switzerland)	Gold	20,000^{^}
United Kingdom (BPI)	Platinum	300,000^{*}
United Kingdom (BPI) DVD	Gold	25,000^{*}
United States (RIAA)	Gold	500,000^{^}
Summaries
Europe (IFPI)	Platinum	1,000,000^{*}
^{*} Sales figures based on certification alone.^{^} Shipments figures based on certification alone.
