= 3.0 Live =

Live album by Sting
- Released: 25 April 2025
- Recorded: 2024–2025
- Length: 48:09
- Label: A&M

Sting chronology
The Bridge (2021)	3.0 Live (2025)	The Night Watch: Live at the Rijksmuseum (2026)

3.0 Live is a live album by the English musician Sting, released on 25 April 2025, by A&M Records.

== Background and release ==
3.0 Live was recorded at various locations over Sting's 3.0 tour, and was mixed and mastered for release by Robert Orton and Gene Grimaldi respectively. The production was handled by Martin Kierszenbaum. The press release announcing the album claims that it contains his first released live performance of "Be Still My Beating Heart" from his 1987 album Nothing Like the Sun. The Record Store Day release of the album contains 8 extra tracks, including more performances from the tour, while the digital version contains an extra track from the standard version.

== Critical reception ==
Spin magazine critic David Harris concludes that "it is a fine collection if you are interested in how Sting interprets his old favorites now", noting that "While the 3.0 Tour seemed designed to reward longtime fans, this strange release strategy is good for no one as even those who buy the deluxe edition don’t get the full experience."

== Track listings ==
=== Single-disc version ===
No.	Title	Length
1.	"Message in a Bottle"	5:31
2.	"Englishman in New York"	4:46
3.	"Fields of Gold"	3:20
4.	"Seven Days"	5:00
5.	"All This Time"	3:28
6.	"Driven to Tears"	5:00
7.	"Synchronicity II"	3:56
8.	"Every Breath You Take"	5:16
9.	"Roxanne" / "Be Still My Beating Heart"	8:01
10.	"Fragile"	3:51
Total length:		48:09

Note

- The live version of "Fragile" is absent from physical versions of the single-disc release.

=== Double-disc version ===
Disc one
No.	Title	Length
1.	"Message in a Bottle"	5:31
2.	"Englishman in New York"	4:46
3.	"Fields of Gold"	3:20
4.	"Seven Days"	5:00
5.	"All This Time"	3:28
6.	"Driven to Tears"	5:00
7.	"Synchronicity II"	3:56
8.	"Every Breath You Take"	5:16
9.	"Roxanne" / "Be Still My Beating Heart"	8:01
Total length:		48:09

Disc two
No.	Title	Length
1.	"I Wrote Your Name (Upon My Heart)"
2.	"It's Probably Me"
3.	"Never Coming Home"
4.	"Tea in the Sahara"
5.	"Fortress Around Your Heart"
6.	"Wrapped Around Your Finger"
7.	"Shape of My Heart"
8.	"Can't Stand Losing You"

Note

- The CD version of the double-disc version was only released in Japan, while the vinyl version was released everywhere for Record Store Day, albeit to a limited supply of only 3,000 copies.

== Release history ==
List of release dates and formats
Region	Date	Format(s)	Edition(s)	Label	Ref.
Various	12 April 2025	2xLP	Record Store Day exclusive	Interscope; A&M	
Various	25 April 2025	Digital download; streaming; CD; vinyl LP	Standard	A&M	
Japan	25 April 2025	CD	Japanese tour edition	Cherrytree; A&M	

== Charts ==
Chart performance for 3.0 Live
Chart (2025)	Peak position
Austrian Albums (Ö3 Austria)	25
Belgian Albums (Ultratop Flanders)	138
Belgian Albums (Ultratop Wallonia)	63
German Albums (Offizielle Top 100)	11
French Albums (SNEP)	82
Scottish Albums (Official Charts)	37
Swiss Albums (Schweizer Hitparade)	18
UK Album Downloads (Official Charts)	53
