= Symphonicities =

Studio album by Sting
- Released: 14 July 2010
- Studios: Abbey Road Studios, London
- Genres: Rock, classical
- Length: 55:39
- Label: Deutsche Grammophon
- Producers: Sting, Rob Mathes

Sting chronology
If on a Winter's Night... (2009)	Symphonicities (2010)	Live in Berlin (2010)

Professional ratings
Aggregate scores
Source	Rating
Metacritic	(62/100)
Review scores
Source	Rating
AllMusic	3.5/5 stars
The Boston Globe	(positive)
Entertainment Weekly	D
Los Angeles Times	3/4 stars
NOW	3/5 stars
PopMatters	5/10 stars
Rolling Stone	3.5/5 stars

Symphonicities is the tenth studio album by English musician Sting, released on 14 July 2010 on Deutsche Grammophon. It was his first studio album featuring new recordings of existing songs drawn from both his solo career and from the Police, followed by the 2019 studio album My Songs. The title of the album blends symphonic— reflecting the album's orchestral arrangements and involvement of the Royal Philharmonic Orchestra—with Synchronicity, the Police album.

== Background ==
The album is a companion piece to the tour of the same name in which Sting, performing with the Royal Philharmonic Concert Orchestra, reinterprets some of his songs as classical symphonic compositions. Symphonicities was recorded at Abbey Road Studios, and produced by Rob Mathes and Sting. Elliot Scheiner and Claudius Mittendorfer mixed the record, and it was mastered by Scott Hull. As of November 2010, the album had sold over one million copies worldwide.

== Track listing ==
All songs composed by Sting.

1. "Next to You" – 2:30 (originally from Outlandos d'Amour, 1978)
2. "Englishman in New York" – 4:23 (originally from ...Nothing Like the Sun, 1987)
3. "Every Little Thing She Does Is Magic" – 4:56 (originally from Ghost in the Machine, 1981)
4. "I Hung My Head" – 5:31 (originally from Mercury Falling, 1996)
5. "You Will Be My Ain True Love" – 3:44 (originally from the Cold Mountain soundtrack, 2003)
6. "Roxanne" – 3:37 (originally from Outlandos d'Amour, 1978)
7. "When We Dance" – 5:26 (originally from Fields of Gold: The Best of Sting 1984–1994, 1994)
8. "The End of the Game" – 6:07 (originally a b-side to the song "Brand New Day" from Brand New Day, 1999)
9. "I Burn for You" – 4:03 (originally from the Brimstone & Treacle soundtrack, 1982)
10. "We Work the Black Seam" – 7:19 (originally from The Dream of the Blue Turtles, 1985)
11. "She's Too Good for Me" – 3:03 (originally from Ten Summoner's Tales, 1993)
12. "The Pirate's Bride" – 5:02 (feat. Jo Lawry – originally a b-side to the song "I Was Brought to My Senses" from Mercury Falling, 1996)

=== Bonus tracks ===
- "Straight to My Heart" (Best Buy, Napster, EU iTunes and Japanese bonus track) (originally from ...Nothing Like the Sun, 1987)
- "Why Should I Cry for You?" (iTunes and Japanese bonus track) (originally from The Soul Cages, 1991)
- "Whenever I Say Your Name" (Amazon and Japanese bonus track) (originally from Sacred Love, 2003)
- "Every Little Thing She Does Is Magic" (Bronx Street Fair Mix) (Symphonicities vinyl LP bonus track)

== Personnel ==
- Sting – vocals, acoustic guitar (tracks 9 and 11), harmonica (track 4), rabble rousers (track 11)
- The New York Chamber Consort – orchestra (tracks 1, 2, 9, 11 and 12)
- The London Players – orchestra (tracks 3 and 6)
- The Royal Philharmonic Concert Orchestra – orchestra (tracks 4, 5, 7 and 8)
- Lisa Kim – concertmaster (tracks 1, 2, 9 and 12)
- Jackie Shave – concertmaster (tracks 3 and 6)
- Gerald Gregory – concertmaster (tracks 4, 7 and 8)
- Rob Mathes – arrangements (all tracks except 4, 5 and 7), conducting (tracks 1–3, 6, 9, 10 and 12)
- Steven Mercurio – arrangements (tracks 5 and 7), conducting (tracks 4, 7 and 8)
- David Hartley – arrangements (track 4)
- Jo Lawry – backing vocals (all tracks except 10), duet vocals (tracks 5 and 12)
- David Finck – double bass (tracks 1–3 and 6)
- Ira Coleman – double bass (tracks 4, 5, 7, 8 and 11)
- Dominic Miller – acoustic guitar (tracks 4, 5, 7, 8 and 12), electric guitar (track 11)
- Rob Mathes – piano (tracks 1–3, 6 and 12), acoustic guitar (tracks 3, 6 and 11), rabble rousers (track 11)
- David Cossin – percussion (tracks 1–9)
- Joe Bonadio – percussion (tracks 1, 2, 9–12 and "Every Little Thing She Does Is Magic" (Bronx Street Fair Mix))
- Ben Wittman – programming (track 9)
- Aaron Heick – clarinet solo (track 2)
- Anthony Pleeth – cello (track 6)
- Shelley Woodworth – oboe (track 12)
- Barbara Allen – harp (track 12)
- Jeff Kievit – trumpet (track 10)
- Jim Hynes – trumpet (track 10)
- James Delagarza – trumpet (track 10)
- Dylan Schwab – trumpet (track 10)
- Larry DiBello – horn (track 10)
- Chad Yarborough – horn (track 10)
- David Peel – horn (track 10)
- Theo Primus – horn (track 10)
- Birch Johnson – trombone (track 10)
- Dick Clark – trombone (track 10)
- Jeff Nelson – bass trombone (track 10)
- Marcus Rojas – tuba (track 10)
- Chris Botti – rabble rousers (track 11)
- Ed Cherner – rabble rousers (track 11)
- Tracy Bufferd – rabble rousers (track 11)
- Kathryn Schenker – rabble rousers (track 11)

== Charts ==
=== Weekly charts ===
Weekly chart performance for Symphonicities
Chart (2010–2011)	Peak position
Austrian Albums (Ö3 Austria)	19
Belgian Albums (Ultratop Flanders)	31
Belgian Albums (Ultratop Wallonia)	3
Canadian Albums (Billboard)	9
Croatian International Albums (HDU)	2
Dutch Albums (Album Top 100)	22
Finnish Albums (Suomen virallinen lista)	13
French Albums (SNEP)	10
German Albums (Offizielle Top 100)	7
Greek Albums (IFPI)	5
Hungarian Albums (MAHASZ)	5
Irish Albums (IRMA)	40
Italian Albums (FIMI)	4
Mexican Albums (Top 100 Mexico)	83
New Zealand Albums (RMNZ)	11
Polish Albums (ZPAV)	1
Portuguese Albums (AFP)	1
Russian Albums (2M)	3
Scottish Albums (Official Charts)	30
Spanish Albums (Promusicae)	11
Swedish Albums (Sverigetopplistan)	30
Swiss Albums (Schweizer Hitparade)	15
UK Albums (Official Charts)	30
US Billboard 200	6

=== Year-end charts ===
Year-end chart performance for Symphonicities
Chart (2010)	Position
Belgian Albums (Ultratop Wallonia)	82
French Albums (SNEP)	163
Russian Albums (2M)	45

== Certifications ==
Region	Certification	Certified units/sales
Hungary (MAHASZ)	Platinum	6,000^{^}
Italy (FIMI)	Gold	30,000^{*}
Poland (ZPAV)	3× Platinum	60,000^{*}
Russia (NFPF)	Gold	5,000^{*}
^{*} Sales figures based on certification alone.^{^} Shipments figures based on certification alone.
