= Soul Cages (disambiguation) =

Soul Cages may refer to

- "The Soul Cages" (story), an 1828 short story by Thomas Keightley
- The Soul Cages, a 1991 album by Sting
  - "The Soul Cages" (song), the title song
- Soul Cages (film), a 1999 short film by Phillip Barker
- Soul Cages: The Story of Life, Death and Beyond, a 2012 bharatanatyam dance theater presentation by Savitha Sastry
