= Tony Vacca =

American drummer

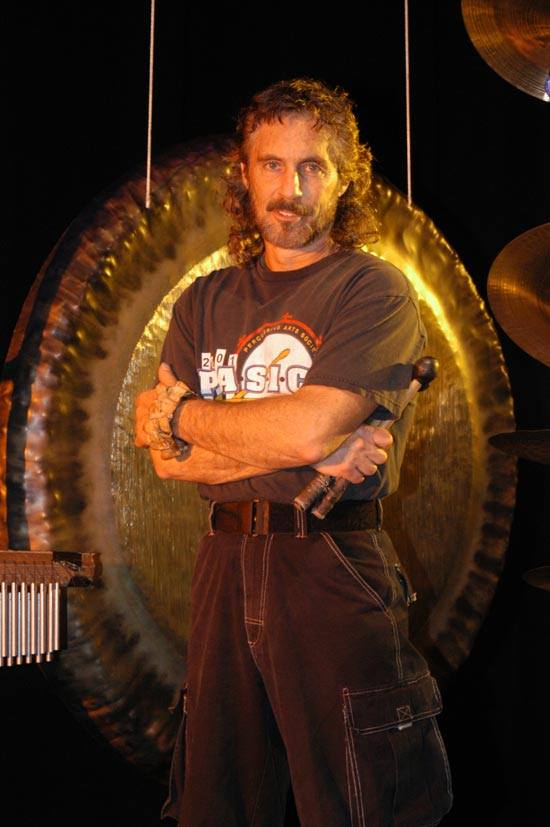
- Website: http://www.tonyvacca.com

Tony Vacca is an American percussionist specializing in jazz and an early innovator in world music. He incorporates percussion instruments from a world of traditions that includes African, Caribbean, Asian and Middle-Eastern influences, to which he adds some of his spoken word and rhythm poetry. Tony has been active in the Jazz and World Music stage since the early 1970s.

Vacca plays both as a soloist and with his World Rhythms Ensemble. His frequent trips to West Africa have contributed to his unique approach to playing the balafon, and to his depth of knowledge regarding African and American musical traditions.

Vacca has recorded and performed with such a wide range of musicians such as Sting, Senegalese Afro-pop artist Baaba Maal, Jazz trumpeter Don Cherry, poet Abiodun Oyewole, Senegalese Hip-Hop artists Gokh-bi System, and Massamba Diop.

Vacca's performances have been described as a "non-stop athletic spectacle of percussion music and spoken word." Percussion instruments from around the world are combined, including West African balafons, 20 Paiste gongs, djembe, djun-djun, talkin drums and a drumset.

Vacca often collaborates with other artists, including Sting on Soul Cages.

== Discography ==
- Dance Beneath the Diamond Sky (Columbia, 1992)
- City Spirits (Philo, 1994)
- Three Point Landing (Half Note, 2002)
- Rhythm Griots (World Rhythms, 2004)
- Rhythm Mission (World Rhythms, 2004)
- Zen Rant (Tony Vacca, 2004)
- Senegal-America Project (World Rhythms, 2006)

With Winds of Change

- Far East Subway Blues (Muse/Art, 1983)
