= Acoustic Live in Newcastle =

Live album by Sting
- Released: 11 November 1991
- Recorded: 20 April 1991
- Venue: Buddle Arts Centre (Newcastle upon Tyne)
- Genres: Jazz, Pop
- Length: 31:27
- Label: A&M
- Producer: Hugh Padgham

Sting chronology
The Soul Cages (1991)	Acoustic Live in Newcastle (1991)	Ten Summoner's Tales (1993)

Acoustic Live in Newcastle is the second live album released by Sting. It was recorded and released shortly after the studio album The Soul Cages, at the Buddle Arts Centre in Newcastle upon Tyne, England, on 20 April 1991. The album includes four tracks from The Soul Cages, as well as a cover of the Bill Withers song "Ain't No Sunshine".

== Background ==
Acoustic Live in Newcastle was only released as a limited edition box set in the United Kingdom, Germany, Australia, and Japan, and is therefore much sought after by fans. The venue where the album was recorded is near Sting's birthplace, and the show was an intimate, closed performance for friends, family, and other invited guests. Sting used select musicians from the Soul Cages tour, including Northumbrian smallpipe artist Kathryn Tickell.

== Box set features ==
The box set of Acoustic Live in Newcastle includes an 89-page book entitled The Illustrated Lyrics that features visual interpretations of several Sting songs by artist Roberto Gligorov. The art is in different styles, including comic book art.

== Track listing ==
1. "Mad About You" (Sting)
2. "Ain't No Sunshine" (Withers)
3. "Island of Souls" (Sting)
4. "The Wild Wild Sea" (Sting)
5. "The Soul Cages" (Sting)

These recordings were also released as B-sides to the "Seven Days" CD single (tracks 1–2 on one version, tracks 3–5 on another).

== Credits ==
- Sting – vocals, double bass
- Dominic Miller – guitar, backing vocals
- Vinnie Colaiuta – drums
- David Sancious – keyboards, backing vocals
- Kathryn Tickell – Northumbrian smallpipe
