= Steven Campbell (artist) =

Scottish painter (1953–2007)

Steven Campbell (1953–2007) was a painter from Scotland.

== Biography ==
Campbell was born in the Burnside district of Rutherglen, attended the town's Academy and worked as an engineer at Clydebridge Steelworks before studying at Glasgow School of Art as a mature student, from 1978 to 1982. Initially he studied the then still new subject of performance art, but quickly gave this up for painting.

At the end of his studies he was awarded the Bram Stoker gold medal, and gained a Fulbright Scholarship which he used to go to New York to study at the Pratt Institute. This move resulted in many of his early exhibitions taking place in New York, including his first solo show, in 1983, at the Barbara Toll Gallery.

There is some dispute as to whether Campbell was one of the core group of students nurtured by the artist and tutor Alexander Moffat at Glasgow School of Art, including Peter Howson and Ken Currie, but Campbell was certainly included by Moffat in the 1981 group show The Vigorous Imagination at the New 57 Gallery, Edinburgh, above the Fruitmarket Gallery, which was the first public showing of this group. He was also included in the seminal exhibition at Glasgow's Third Eye Centre entitled New Image Glasgow, again curated by Moffat, which is still regarded as an exemplar in how a non-metropolitan centre can promote art and culture on the international stage. In this exhibition Moffat presented Campbell and other Glasgow artists as a 'New Scottish School'. He was also included in the 1985 Hayward Annual exhibition held at the Hayward Gallery, London, and had a joint show with the British Pop Artist Colin Self at the Fruitmarket Gallery in Edinburgh.

Campbell returned to live in Glasgow in 1986, and that same year his painting The Dangerous Early and Late Life of Lytton Strachey was acquired by The Tate. The following year he was included in a group show, also called The Vigorous Imagination New Scottish Art held at the Scottish National Gallery of Modern Art in Edinburgh as part of the Edinburgh Festival, at which he cemented his elevated status within the new Scottish art world by being one of the most prominently displayed artists. 1987 was also the year of his first exhibition of paintings with the London art gallery Marlborough Fine Art. This was only Campbell's second solo show in London, the first having been at the Riverside Studios in 1984. In 1988, Campbell's painting A Man Perceived by a Flea, painted in 1985, was acquired by the Scottish National Gallery,

Further works were acquired by state collections in Britain, including Napoleonic Silhouettist Cutting the Progress of the War by the Arts Council in 1987, Painting on a Darwinian Theme by the British Council in 1988, and Three men of exactly the same size in an unequal room by Leeds City Art Gallery in 1989.

In the late 1990s Campbell withdrew from public life with worries over his health. It was not until 2002 that he exhibited again, with what proved to be his last major show, at the Talbot Rice Gallery in Edinburgh.

A commissioned piece by Campbell was the cover art for Sting's 1991 album The Soul Cages.

Campbell died of a ruptured appendix on 15 August 2007, aged 54. He was married and had three children.

Campbell's Estate is represented by Marlborough Fine Art, London.

== Style and influences ==
Campbell's style of painting is figurative, with a hard linear quality to the application of paint. The colour palette is strong, with rich colours tending to be dominated by a blue-green light. Campbell would boast of being a very fast painter, although it has been suggested he liked to exaggerate claims like this.

His subject matter has been described as focusing on the surreal ridiculousness of the English gentleman, with almost Bertie Wooster type scenarios shown in his paintings. Certainly a number of his paintings show slightly old fashioned looking men dressed in tweed suits, as in The Dangerous Early and Late Life of Lytton Strachey in the Tate.

As this suggests, there is a strong literary element in the paintings, and in common with many other artists who were showcased by Alexander Moffat in his exhibition New Image Glasgow at the Third Eye Centre, Glasgow, in 1985, one of the sources for this narrative bent in Campbell's work is the Neue Sachlichkeit artists of 1920s Germany. Of particular relevance would seem to be the paintings of the Neue Sachlichkeit artist Otto Dix whose colouring, subject matter and sharp realist drawing style in paintings like To Beauty, prefigures the work of Campbell closely. However, Campbell's images have also been linked to English painters of the same period, including Stanley Spencer. Certainly this linear, or as the art critic Tim Hilton called it 'illustrational', quality is evident in a painting like Campbell's Battle of Myths! The Tree Man/The Green Man, oil on canvas, which was unfinished at the time of his death in 2007.

Campbell's paintings include many recurring motifs, such as skulls, birds and anthropomorphic foliage, but also recurring patterns, such as the paisley pattern that reappears in several of his late paintings. This use of visual motifs to hint at possible narratives which are rarely straightforward or easy to decode led to some critics dismissing Campbell's work, with the critic of The Independent newspaper in London calling it as a 'soup of arcane motifs'. But following his death Campbell's store amongst art critics seemed to rise, with The Times newspaper calling him 'one of the most forceful and original artists to have emerged lately in Britain', and The Guardian 'The most exciting painter to emerge anywhere for many years'.

Certainly Campbell's importance to the renaissance in Scottish art in the 1980s, which saw Glasgow become one of the major international centres for contemporary art at that time, is acknowledged to be very great. According to John McKechnie, the director of the Glasgow Print Studio, at which Campbell exhibited in 2004,: "If it wasn't for Steven Campbell, we would never have the focus we do now on visual art in Glasgow. Before Steven came along there really wasn't any expectation that you could make it as an artist on an international scene."
