= Fields of Gold: The Best of Sting 1984–1994 =

Greatest hits album by Sting
- Released: 7 November 1994
- Recorded: 1983–1994
- Studios: Lake House, Wiltshire, England
- Genre: Rock
- Length: 76:56 (International); 66:44 (US)
- Label: A&M
- Producers: Sting; Hugh Padgham; Pete Smith; Neil Dorfsman; Michael Kamen

Sting chronology
Ten Summoner's Tales (1993)	Fields of Gold: The Best of Sting 1984–1994 (1994)	Mercury Falling (1996)

Singles from Fields of Gold
- 1. "When We Dance" Released: 17 October 1994; 2. "This Cowboy Song" Released: 30 January 1995

Professional ratings
Review scores
Source	Rating
AllMusic	4/5 stars
Entertainment Weekly	B
Music Week	5/5 stars
The Rolling Stone Album Guide	4/5 stars

Fields of Gold: The Best of Sting 1984–1994 is the first greatest hits album by English musician Sting. Released in November 1994, it features hit singles from his first four studio albums The Dream of the Blue Turtles (1985), ...Nothing Like the Sun (1987), The Soul Cages (1991), and Ten Summoner's Tales (1993), plus two new tracks. A companion music video compilation was released on LaserDisc and VHS.

== Album information ==
The two new tracks included on the album—"When We Dance" and "This Cowboy Song"—were both released as singles.

== Track listing ==
All tracks are written by Sting, except where noted.

U.S. edition
No.	Title	Writer(s)	Album	Length
1.	"When We Dance"		New song	5:59
2.	"If You Love Somebody Set Them Free"		The Dream of the Blue Turtles (1985)	4:15
3.	"Fields of Gold"		Ten Summoner's Tales (1993)	3:38
4.	"All This Time"		The Soul Cages (1991)	4:54
5.	"Fortress Around Your Heart" (remixed version)		The Dream of the Blue Turtles	4:35
6.	"Be Still My Beating Heart"		...Nothing Like the Sun (1987)	5:32
7.	"They Dance Alone (Cueca Solo)"		...Nothing Like the Sun	7:13
8.	"If I Ever Lose My Faith in You"		Ten Summoner's Tales	4:30
9.	"Fragile"		...Nothing Like the Sun	3:52
10.	"Why Should I Cry for You?" (remixed version)		The Soul Cages	4:51
11.	"Englishman in New York"		...Nothing Like the Sun	4:27
12.	"We'll Be Together" (previously unreleased version)		...Nothing Like the Sun	3:50
13.	"Russians"	Sting; Sergei Prokofiev	The Dream of the Blue Turtles	3:57
14.	"This Cowboy Song"		New song	5:00

International edition
No.	Title	Writer(s)	Album	Length
1.	"When We Dance"		new song	5:59
2.	"If You Love Somebody Set Them Free"		The Dream of the Blue Turtles	4:15
3.	"Fields of Gold"		Ten Summoner's Tales	3:38
4.	"All This Time"		The Soul Cages	4:54
5.	"Englishman in New York"		...Nothing Like the Sun	4:27
6.	"Mad About You"		The Soul Cages	3:53
7.	"It's Probably Me" (with Eric Clapton)	Sting; Clapton; Michael Kamen	Lethal Weapon 3 soundtrack	5:02
8.	"They Dance Alone (Cueca Solo)"		...Nothing Like the Sun	7:13
9.	"If I Ever Lose My Faith in You"		Ten Summoner's Tales	4:30
10.	"Fragile"		...Nothing Like the Sun	3:52
11.	"We'll Be Together" (alternate version)		...Nothing Like the Sun	3:50
12.	"Moon Over Bourbon Street"		The Dream of the Blue Turtles	3:59
13.	"Love Is the Seventh Wave"		The Dream of the Blue Turtles	3:31
14.	"Russians"	Sting; Prokofiev	The Dream of the Blue Turtles	3:57
15.	"Why Should I Cry for You?" (alternate version)		The Soul Cages	4:51
16.	"This Cowboy Song"		new song	5:00
17.	"Fragile" (Spanish version)		...Nothing Like the Sun	3:52
18.	"Take Me to the Sunshine"		on single-track CD included with Japanese release

=== LaserDisc/VHS ===
Side one

1. "When We Dance" – 5:59
  - new song
2. "If You Love Somebody Set Them Free" – 4:15
  - originally released on the album The Dream of the Blue Turtles
3. "Fields of Gold" – 3:39
  - originally released on the album Ten Summoner's Tales
4. "All This Time" – 4:55
  - originally released on the album The Soul Cages
5. "Fortress Around Your Heart" – 4:35
  - remixed version of track originally released on the album The Dream of the Blue Turtles
6. "Be Still My Beating Heart" – 5:32
  - originally released on the album ...Nothing Like the Sun
7. "Bring on the Night"
  - LaserDisc/VHS version exclusive
8. "They Dance Alone (Cueca Solo)" – 7:10
  - originally released on the album ...Nothing Like the Sun
9. "If I Ever Lose My Faith in You" – 4:31
  - originally released on the album Ten Summoner's Tales
10. "Fragile" – 3:53
  - originally released on the album ...Nothing Like the Sun
11. "Why Should I Cry for You" – 4:50
  - alternate version of track originally released on the album The Soul Cages
12. "Englishman in New York" – 4:27
  - originally released on the album ...Nothing Like the Sun

Side two

1. "Russians" – 3:58
  - originally released on the album The Dream of the Blue Turtles
2. "It's Probably Me" (with Eric Clapton) (Sting, Clapton, Kamen)
  - LaserDisc/VHS version exclusive
3. "We'll Be Together" – 3:51
  - studio/music video version; originally released on the album ...Nothing Like the Sun
4. "Demolition Man"
  - LaserDisc/VHS version exclusive
5. "This Cowboy Song" – 5:00
  - new song

== Singles ==
- "When We Dance" (1994) #9 UK, #38 US
- "This Cowboy Song" (1994) #15 UK

== Charts ==
=== Weekly charts ===
Chart (1994–1995)	Peak position
Australian Albums (ARIA)	20
Austrian Albums (Ö3 Austria)	7
Belgian Albums (Ultratop Flanders)	17
Belgian Albums (Ultratop Wallonia)	15
Canadian Albums (RPM)	14
Dutch Albums (Album Top 100)	5
Estonian Albums (Eesti Top 10)	1
Finnish Albums (Suomen virallinen lista)	48
German Albums (Offizielle Top 100)	4
Hungarian Albums (MAHASZ)	28
New Zealand Albums (RMNZ)	5
Norwegian Albums (VG-lista)	5
Scottish Albums (Official Charts)	5
Swedish Albums (Sverigetopplistan)	5
Swiss Albums (Schweizer Hitparade)	5
UK Albums (Official Charts)	2
US Billboard 200	7

=== Year-end charts ===
Chart (1994)	Position
Dutch Albums (Album Top 100)	41

Chart (1995)	Position
Belgian Albums (Ultratop Flanders)	64
Belgian Albums (Ultratop Wallonia)	23
Dutch Albums (Album Top 100)	26
German Albums (Offizielle Top 100)	22
Swiss Albums (Schweizer Hitparade)	44
UK Albums (OCC)	65
US Billboard 200	62

== Certifications ==
Region	Certification	Certified units/sales
Argentina (CAPIF)	Platinum	60,000^{^}
Austria (IFPI Austria)	Gold	25,000^{*}
Belgium (BRMA)	Gold	25,000^{*}
Canada (Music Canada)	Platinum	100,000^{^}
Finland (Musiikkituottajat)	Platinum	68,127
France (SNEP)	Platinum	300,000^{*}
Germany (BVMI)	Platinum	500,000^{^}
Japan (RIAJ)	Platinum	271,830
Mexico (AMPROFON)	Gold	100,000^{^}
New Zealand (RMNZ)	2× Platinum	30,000^{^}
Poland (ZPAV)	Gold	50,000^{*}
Spain (Promusicae)	Platinum	100,000^{^}
Sweden (GLF)	Gold	50,000^{^}
Switzerland (IFPI Switzerland)	Platinum	50,000^{^}
United Kingdom (BPI)	3× Platinum	900,000^{^}
United States (RIAA)	2× Platinum	2,000,000^{^}
Summaries
Europe (IFPI)	4× Platinum	4,000,000^{*}
^{*} Sales figures based on certification alone.^{^} Shipments figures based on certification alone.
