= This Cowboy Song =

1995 single by Sting

Single by Sting

from the album Fields of Gold: The Best of Sting 1984–1994
- Released: 30 January 1995
- Recorded: August–September 1994
- Studio: Lake House (Wiltshire, England)
- Length: 5:00
- Label: A&M
- Songwriter: Sting
- Producers: Hugh Padgham; Sting

Sting singles chronology
"When We Dance" (1994)	"This Cowboy Song" (1995)	"Let Your Soul Be Your Pilot" (1996)

Audio
- "This Cowboy Song" on YouTube

"This Cowboy Song" is a song by English musician Sting. Alongside "When We Dance", it is one of two new tracks included on his first compilation album, Fields of Gold: The Best of Sting 1984–1994 released in November 1994. Recorded at Lake House in Wiltshire throughout August and September 1994, the song centers around the concept of one's own mortality from the point of view of a cowboy pondering his current life. "This Cowboy Song" was released as the album's second single on 30 January 1995 by A&M Records, becoming a top-40 hit in the United Kingdom, Canada, Iceland, and Ireland.

== Release ==
"This Cowboy Song" became a top-20 hit in Sting's native UK, peaking at number 15 on the UK Singles Chart. The song was not released as a single in the United States but did chart in Canada, reaching number 34 on the RPM 100 Hit Tracks chart. A music video was made for the song, directed by Howard Greenhalgh. It was filmed in Spain and featured what Sting referred to as "every cliché that's ever been filmed for a Western".

== Critical reception ==
Emma Cochrane from Smash Hits gave the song three out of five, writing, "A few years back Grandpa Sting released a mellow track called 'Bring On the Night'. Now he's releasing it again, only he's called it 'The Cowboy Song'. Alright, so he's changed the words, but the tune is exactly the same and it sounds nothing like riding along on the range with a trusty can of beans by your side."

== Track listings ==
All tracks were written by Sting.

- UK CD1 and Australian CD single
1. "This Cowboy Song" (remix featuring Pato Banton) – 3:59
2. "If You Love Somebody Set Them Free" (Brothers in Rhythm edit) – 4:14
3. "If You Love Somebody Set Them Free" (A Brothers in Rhythm soundtrack) – 11:28
4. "Demolition Man" (Soulpower edit) – 3:40
- UK CD2
1. "This Cowboy Song" (remix featuring Pato Banton) – 3:59
2. "This Cowboy Song" (extended remix) – 11:40
3. "When We Dance" (classic radio) – 5:07
4. "Take Me to the Sunshine" – 3:38
- UK and Australian cassette single; European CD single; Japanese mini-CD single
1. "This Cowboy Song" (remix featuring Pato Banton) – 3:59
2. "If You Love Somebody Set Them Free" (Brothers in Rhythm edit) – 4:14

== Charts ==
=== Weekly charts ===
Chart (1995)	Peak position
Australia (ARIA)	88
Canada Top Singles (RPM)	34
Canada Adult Contemporary (RPM)	19
Europe (Eurochart Hot 100)	37
Europe (European Hit Radio)	2
Finland (Suomen virallinen lista)	13
Germany (GfK)	51
Iceland (Íslenski Listinn Topp 40)	9
Ireland (IRMA)	19
Israel (IBA)	36
Italy Airplay (Music & Media)	5
Netherlands (Dutch Top 40 Tipparade)	2
Netherlands (Single Top 100)	48
Scottish Singles Sales (Official Charts)	18
UK Singles (Official Charts)	15
UK Airplay (Music Week)	2

=== Year-end charts ===
Chart (1995)	Position
Europe (European Hit Radio)	20
Iceland (Íslenski Listinn Topp 40)	75
UK Airplay (Music Week)	19

== Release history ==
Region	Date	Format(s)	Label(s)	Ref.
United Kingdom	30 January 1995	CD1; cassette	A&M	
United Kingdom	6 February 1995	CD2	A&M	
Australia	13 February 1995	CD; cassette	A&M; Polydor	
Japan	25 February 1995	Mini-CD	A&M	
