= If I Ever Lose My Faith in You =

1993 single by Sting

Single by Sting

from the album Ten Summoner's Tales
- Released: 1 February 1993
- Studio: Lake House (Wiltshire, England)
- Genre: Pop
- Length: 4:29
- Label: A&M
- Songwriter: Sting
- Producers: Sting; Hugh Padgham

Sting singles chronology
"It's Probably Me" (1992)	"If I Ever Lose My Faith in You" (1993)	"Seven Days" (1993)

Music video
- "If I Ever Lose My Faith in You" on YouTube

"If I Ever Lose My Faith in You" is a song by English singer-songwriter Sting, released on 1 February 1993 by A&M Records as the lead single from his fourth studio album, Ten Summoner's Tales (1993). The song, written by him and co-produced with Hugh Padgham, reached number 17 on the US Billboard Hot 100 and the top 40 in several European countries. In Canada, the song reached number one, spending three weeks atop the RPM 100 Hit Tracks chart and finishing 1993 as Canada's fourth-most-successful single.

In 1994, the song won Sting a Grammy Award for Best Male Pop Vocal Performance, while it was also nominated for both Record of the Year and for Song of the Year. It has been included on all of Sting's compilation albums since its release, namely Fields of Gold: The Best of Sting 1984–1994 and The Very Best of Sting & The Police.

== Composition ==
The song, in the key of A major, is played in swing time. According to Sting, the song was written on the piano, and contains a flattened fifth in the song's intro, (Note: The song begins with a chromatic sequence up from the minor third (C) of A to the flat 5th (E♭), with A minor, A major (C♯), A suspended 4th (D), and A flattened 5th (E♭) chords.) which he says was banned in the churches due to its dissonant sound:

It starts off with a flattened fifth. A flat five is an interesting chord because it was banned by the church. It's called a tri-tone, and it was banned by the church – it was the devil's music. Blues music is based on the tri-tone, and in sacred music from the middle-ages, the Pope banned the tri-tone, the flattened fifth. It's disconcerting. It puts you ill at ease. So we start that way so that you think it's been going on for a while, but it hasn't.

The "You" in the song's title is not identified by Sting, as he felt it was important not to point out what it is specifically so that the listeners could connect more with the song:

The song is in two distinct parts. The first part is about the things I've lost faith in. It's quite easy to be precise about the things I've lost faith in – politics, media, science, technology, the things that everybody has, and yet I along with most other people have a great deal of hope, and a feeling that things will and can get better. So what do we place our faith in I can't define that as easily as I can define what I don't believe in anymore. So I haven't defined it, I've just said if I ever lose my faith in you, and "You" could be my producer, it could be faith in God, it could be faith in myself, or it could be faith in romantic love. It could be all of those things, I don't define it. I think it's important not to define it, because once you can define something it evaporates. I think it's important in this day and age when we are dictated to by music television what a particular song is about, that the old ambiguity that songs had can be retained.

== Critical reception ==
Alan Jones from Music Week gave the song a grade of three out of five, writing, "Less gloomy and more immediate commercial than some of his solo material, though it won't hit the high numbers." Billboard said that the song's "forthright, nicely nuanced vocal propels a crisply textured track with sax -like harmonica and nifty rhythmic touches." They also thought that it was "Sting's most beguiling solo rock ballad since 'If You Love Somebody Set Them Free'".

In his review of the Ten Summoner's Tales album, Andrew Collins from Select said, "The manifesto pension-plan-advert love anthem 'If I Ever Lose My Faith in You' is typical of this down-to-earthness." Ray Boren of Deseret News wrote that the song was" classic Sting, stark and typically rhythmic, yet grand". Tom Moon, writing for Entertainment Weekly classified the song as part of the album's "catchy, unburdened moments" and went on to praise Sting's "surprisingly resolute lead vocal".

Sting was surprised by how popular the song became, stating: "I got a prize for this. It was the most played record on American radio in 1993, which kind of surprised me. But I suppose it captured a mood. We've lost faith in a lot of institutions, our government, our churches – most things. And yet we still maintain a sense of hope about the future."

== Track listings ==
- UK CD1
1. "If I Ever Lose My Faith in You"
2. "All This Time" (unplugged)
3. "Mad About You" (unplugged)
4. "Every Breath You Take" (unplugged)
- UK CD2
1. "If I Ever Lose My Faith in You"
2. "Message in a Bottle" (unplugged)
3. "Tea in the Sahara" (unplugged)
4. "Walking on the Moon" (unplugged)
- UK 7-inch and cassette single
- European CD single
- Australian cassette single
- Japanese mini-CD single
1. "If I Ever Lose My Faith in You" – 4:29
2. "Every Breath You Take" (unplugged) – 5:06
- European maxi-CD single
1. "If I Ever Lose My Faith in You" – 4:29
2. "Every Breath You Take" (unplugged) – 5:06
3. "All This Time" (unplugged) – 5:20
- US maxi-CD single
1. "If I Ever Lose My Faith in You" (LP version) – 4:29
2. "Everybody Laughed but You" – 3:51
3. "January Stars" – 3:50
4. "We Work the Black Seam (1993)" – 6:08
- US cassette single
1. "If I Ever Lose My Faith in You" (LP version) – 4:29
2. "All This Time" (unplugged) – 5:20
- Australian CD single
1. "If I Ever Lose My Faith in You"
2. "Every Breath You Take" (unplugged)
3. "Message in a Bottle" (unplugged)
4. "All This Time" (unplugged)
- Japanese maxi-CD single
1. "If I Ever Lose My Faith in You"
2. "All This Time" (unplugged)
3. "Mad About You" (unplugged)
4. "Every Breath You Take" (unplugged)

== Credits ==
- Sting – bass, vocals, guitar, harmonica; producer on track 1
- Dominic Miller – guitars
- David Sancious – keyboards; piano on tracks 2–4
- Vinnie Colaiuta – drums
- Vinx – percussion and backing vocals on tracks 2–4
- Hugh Padgham – producer on track 1
- Joel Gallen – executive producer on tracks 2–4
- Alex Coletti – producer on tracks 2–4

== Charts ==
=== Weekly charts ===
Chart (1993)	Peak position
Australia (ARIA)	41
Belgium (Ultratop 50 Flanders)	10
Canada Top Singles (RPM)	1
Canada Adult Contemporary (RPM)	7
Denmark (IFPI)	9
Europe (Eurochart Hot 100)	16
Europe (European Hit Radio)	1
Finland (Suomen virallinen lista)	8
Finland Airplay (Radiosoittolista)	10
France (SNEP)	39
Germany (GfK)	31
Iceland (Íslenski Listinn Topp 40)	9
Ireland (IRMA)	28
Israel (Israeli Singles Chart)	14
Italy (Musica e dischi)	2
Netherlands (Dutch Top 40)	15
Netherlands (Single Top 100)	30
New Zealand (Recorded Music NZ)	36
Norway (VG-lista)	7
Portugal (AFP)	2
Spain (AFYVE)	9
Sweden (Sverigetopplistan)	34
Switzerland (Schweizer Hitparade)	16
UK Singles (Official Charts)	14
UK Airplay (Music Week)	2
UK Club Chart (Music Week)	50
US Billboard Hot 100	17
US Adult Contemporary (Billboard)	8
US Alternative Airplay (Billboard)	4
US Mainstream Rock Airplay (Billboard)	5
US Pop Airplay (Billboard)	4
US Cash Box Top 100	5

=== Year-end charts ===
Chart (1993)	Position
Canada Top Singles (RPM)	4
Canada Adult Contemporary (RPM)	66
Europe (Eurochart Hot 100)	88
Europe (European Hit Radio)	11
Iceland (Íslenski Listinn Topp 40)	77
UK Airplay (Music Week)	34
US Billboard Hot 100	96
US Adult Contemporary (Billboard)	32
US Album Rock Tracks (Billboard)	23
US Modern Rock Tracks (Billboard)	22

== Release history ==
Region	Date	Format(s)	Label(s)	Ref(s).
United Kingdom	1 February 1993	7-inch vinyl; CD1; cassette	A&M	
United Kingdom	8 February 1993	CD2	A&M	
Australia	14 February 1993	CD; cassette	A&M	
Japan	28 February 1993	Mini-CD; maxi-CD	A&M	

== Cover versions ==
Jazzist Greg Adams composed an instrumental cover of the song, which was featured on his 2006 album, Cool to the Touch. In 2009, trumpeter Chris Botti covered the song featuring Sting on vocals. The song was released from the album Chris Botti in Boston. American singer Lady Gaga performed the song at the 2014 Kennedy Center Honors, where Sting was an honouree.

American heavy metal band Disturbed released a cover of "If I Ever Lose My Faith in You" in 2020. "We have loved this song for a long time, and even though it was released in 1993, it seems strangely applicable to today's world," stated the band. "The song is about losing faith, and might initially sound pessimistic, but it's about the importance and power of personal relationships, and how they can save you and provide solace in an increasingly confusing world."
