= Rob Mathes =

American composer (born 1970)

- Born: September 10, 1970 (age 56); Boston, Massachusetts, U.S.
- Education: Berklee College of Music
- Occupations: Composer, arranger, pianist, music educator
- Musical career
- Genres: Pop, rock
- Instruments: Piano, guitar, mandolin, vocals
- Website: www.robmathes.com

Rob Mathes (born November 21, 1963) is an American record producer, music arranger, composer, and songwriter. He worked with Sting on The Last Ship, co-writing and co-producing. Mathes has also written bluesy spiritual pop music.

== Early life ==
Mathes was born in Boston, Massachusetts, to classical musicians and music instructors Joan and George Mathes. The family moved to Greenwich, Connecticut, where his parents taught music with the local schools and privately. Rob Mathes showed interest and skill in music at a very early age. In his youth, Mathes attended Berklee College of Music where he studied under John Mehegan, a jazz pianist who was a Juilliard faculty member at the time, and later he left Berklee College of Music to study orchestration and counterpoint, privately, under Myron Fink.

== Early career ==
By high school, Mathes was already working regularly as a professional writer and performer in the clubs of nearby New York City. He toured with Chuck Mangione in his early 20s. Mathes then began to focus on writing and arranging in Nashville, and soon was writing songs for Bonnie Raitt, Kathy Mattea, Aaron Neville, Wynonna Judd, Faith Hill, Oleta Adams, Alabama, and Randy Travis.

== Producing ==
Mathes works frequently as a record producer in a wide range of genres. He has produced the last three Sting albums: Symphonicities, Best of 25 Years, and The Last Ship. Mathes has also produced for many other artists, including Panic! at the Disco, the Young Veins, Beth Hart, Bettye LaVette, Carly Simon, Rod Stewart, Vanessa L. Williams, Michael Cavanaugh, and Melissa Errico.

== Arranging and composition ==
Albums that Mathes is credited for arranging include:

- Genius Loves Company (2004) – Ray Charles
- Pretty. Odd. (2008) – Panic at the Disco
- Take a Vacation! (2010) - The Young Veins
- Symphonicities (2010) – Sting
- Save Rock and Roll (2013) – Fall Out Boy
- Too Weird to Live, Too Rare to Die! (2013) – Panic! at the Disco
- Water in a Whale (2013) – Jillette Johnson
- High Hopes (2014) – Bruce Springsteen
- Pray for the Wicked (2018) – Panic! at the Disco
- A Celebration of Endings (2020) – Biffy Clyro
- OK Human (2021) – Weezer

Other artists for whom Mathes has done arranging and composition work include Train, Gin Wigmore, Lou Reed, Bono, Sting, Sade, Lenny Kravitz and Jay-Z, Yo Yo Ma, Eric Clapton, Elton John, Luciano Pavarotti, Boston Pops Orchestra, Tony Bennett, Natalie Cole, Hot Hot Heat, Avril Lavigne, Butch Walker, Renée Fleming, Vanessa Carlton, Bowling for Soup, Evangeline Vournazos, Tim McGraw, Yolanda Adams, George Michael, Celine Dion, Ghostface Killah, Peter Cincotti, Renee Olstead, Lyle Lovett, Ronan Tynan, David Sanborn, Michael McDonald, Eliane Elias, the Cab and the Young Veins.

Mathes also worked on string arrangements for several songs for the soundtrack of the 2025 animated film KPop Demon Hunters, including "Golden" and "Takedown".

== Solo work ==
Mathes has also released his own albums, including Evening Train (a cult favorite among artists such as Phil Ramone, Jimmy Webb and Warren Zevon), William the Angel (a Christmas album), Orchestral Songs, Rob Mathes: Beyond the Music (a live broadcast and accompanying sound track), Everywhere, Flesh & Spirit and Wheelbarrow.

Perhaps best known among his performances are yearly Christmas concerts, which have spawned two PBS television specials, Christmas Is Coming: Rob Mathes and Friends (featuring Michael McDonald, David Sanborn, Ossie Davis and Vanessa L. Williams) and I Want to Hear the Bells, a documentary of his first Christmas concert in 1993. Mathes celebrated 25 years of performing his annual holiday concerts in 2018 with special guests Sting, Vanessa Williams and David Sanborn joining him on stage for a few holiday-themed songs.

== Live productions ==
Mathes' work with The Kennedy Center Honors led to the show We Are One: The Obama Inaugural Celebration at the Lincoln Memorial in 2008, with performances by Beyoncé, Mary J. Blige, Bono, Garth Brooks, Sheryl Crow, Renee Fleming, Josh Groban, Jon Bon Jovi, Herbie Hancock, Heather Headley, John Legend, Jennifer Nettles, John Mellencamp, Usher, Shakira, Bruce Springsteen, James Taylor, will.i.am and Stevie Wonder.

In 2012, Mathes arranged a cover of "Stairway to Heaven" for the Kennedy Center event honoring Led Zeppelin, with vocals by Ann Wilson and Nancy Wilson of Heart, backed by an orchestra and two choirs, drummer Jason Bonham (son of late Led Zeppelin drummer John Bonham) and guitarist Shane Fontayne, a performance that garnered tears and a standing ovation from the surviving members of the band.

Mathes arranged Renée Fleming's 2014 Super Bowl performance of "The Star-Spangled Banner", recorded by the New Jersey Symphony Orchestra.

He served as musical director and orchestrator for the Broadway production of The Last Ship.

== Teaching ==
Mathes also works as a music educator. Mathes is an associate professor at Berklee College of Music's NYC campus.

== Awards and honors ==
Mathes received the 2012 Emmy in the Outstanding Music Direction category for his work with The Kennedy Center Honors, which airs on CBS each holiday season.

He was nominated for a Tony Award for his orchestration work on the 2014 musical The Last Ship.

== See also ==
- List of music arrangers
