= Why Should I Cry for You =

Single by Sting

from the album The Soul Cages
- Released: 1991
- Length: 4:46
- Label: A&M
- Songwriter: Sting
- Producers: Sting; Hugh Padgham

Sting singles chronology
"The Soul Cages" (1991)	"Why Should I Cry for You" (1991)	"It's Probably Me" (1992)

"Why Should I Cry for You" is a song by English musician Sting. It was released as a single from his third studio album, The Soul Cages (1991), in North America, Japan and certain European countries by A&M Records in 1991. The song has since been performed live by Sting and has been included on some of his compilations.

Sting first performed the song live on his 1991 tour promoting The Soul Cages. "Why Should I Cry for You" also received a live orchestral rendition on Sting's 2010 Live in Berlin album.

== Release ==
In February 1991, "Why Should I Cry For You" was listed by Rolling Stone as one of the four singles planned for release from Sting's studio album The Soul Cages. In North America, "Why Should I Cry For You" was the second single released from the album after "All This Time".

The US trade publication Cashbox included "Why Should I Cry for You" on its list of the 15 songs most likely to reach the top 100 of their pop singles chart on their 27 April 1991 edition of the publication. For the week dated 4 May 1991, "Why Should I Cry For You" debuted at No. 87 on the Cashbox Top 100 Singles Chart. The following week, it was listed under the "Hits To Watch" column of the Canadian trade publication RPM and entered the RPM 100 chart at No. 94. It later reached its peak of No. 46 during its seventh week on the Canadian singles chart.

In the United States, "Why Should I Cry For You" was serviced to adult contemporary, album oriented rock and contemporary hit radio stations. The song was one of the most added songs to album oriented rock stations reporting to Radio & Records for the week dated 3 May 1991. The song debuted on the Billboard Album Rock Tracks chart at No. 37 and later peaked at No. 32 two weeks later.

A single remix of "Why Should I Cry For You" was included on Sting's 1994 compilation album Fields of Gold: The Best of Sting 1984–1994.

== Critical reception ==
Billboard called the song "an intelligent and pensive ballad" with "subtle African percussion and sweet backing harmonies". Gary Zavoral of The Sacramento Union said that "Why Should I Cry For You" was one of the "tearjerkers" on The Soul Cages. Writing for the Los Angeles Times, Robert Hilburn characterised the song as a "delicate yet eloquent look at the questions and confusion of a son who never had a good relationship with his father and suddenly finds himself, through his father's death, unable ever to correct the situation." Steve Morse of The Boston Globe wrote that the song was a "multitracked, Peter Gabriel-influenced ballad that furthers the catharsis" on the album. Jim Beviglia of American Songwriter called the track "a haunting song that floats along on a bed of tranquil keyboards and guitars, only to be interrupted by crashing drums near the climax".

== Chart performance ==
Chart (1991)	Peak position
Canada Top Singles (RPM)	46
France (SNEP)	38
US Mainstream Rock (Billboard)	32
US Cash Box Top 100	87
