= It's Probably Me =

1992 single by Sting and Eric Clapton

Single by Sting and Eric Clapton

from the album Lethal Weapon 3
- Released: 23 June 1992
- Length: 4:41
- Label: A&M
- Songwriters: Sting, Eric Clapton, Michael Kamen
- Producers: Michael Kamen, Stephen McLaughlin

Sting singles chronology
"Why Should I Cry for You" (1991)	"It's Probably Me" (1992)	"If I Ever Lose My Faith in You" (1993)

Eric Clapton singles chronology
"Tears in Heaven" (1992)	"It's Probably Me" (1992)	"Runaway Train" (1992)

Music video
- "Sting - It's Probably Me (Official Music Video)" on YouTube

"It's Probably Me" is a song originally released in 1992 as a collaboration by Sting featuring Eric Clapton, Michael Kamen, and David Sanborn. Released from the soundtrack to the action comedy film Lethal Weapon 3 in June 1992, the song reached number 20 on the US Billboard Album Rock Tracks chart and number 12 on Canada's RPM 100 Hit Tracks chart. It was more successful in Europe, peaking at number one in Italy, number four in France, and number six in the Netherlands.

== Background and release ==
The song uses leitmotifs that were first used on the soundtrack for the original Lethal Weapon film, released five years earlier. It was released as a single and on the Lethal Weapon 3 movie soundtrack. It also appears on the Fields of Gold: The Best of Sting 1984-1994 international edition compilation album released in 1994, and on Sting's Duets album released in 2021. Sting rerecorded the song in 1993 for his Ten Summoner's Tales album without any of the other musicians.

== Music video ==
A music video was released in mid 1992 featuring Sting, Eric Clapton, Michael Kamen and David Sanborn performing the track together while a few scenes of Lethal Weapon 3 are shown. The video snippets in where the quartet performs the song are shot in black and white. Clapton is also seen smoking a cigarette in the video and using his Zippo petrol lighter to create the opening rhythm instead of a drum set or programme.

== Reception ==
Clapton, Sting and Kamen were nominated for a Grammy Award at the 35th Annual Grammy Awards for Best Song Written Specifically for a Motion Picture or for Television in 1993. At the 1993 MTV Movie Awards Sting and Clapton were both nominated for the Best Movie Song. The American music website AllMusic retrospectively rated the release with two out of five possible stars.

== Track listings ==
US CD and 7-inch single
No.	Title	Length
1.	"It's Probably Me" (edit)	4:41
2.	"It's Probably Me" (album version)	6:30

US maxi-CD single
No.	Title	Length
1.	"It's Probably Me" (soundtrack album version)	6:21
2.	"It's Probably Me"	5:01

== Personnel ==
Musicians

- Sting – lead and backing vocals, bass guitar
- Eric Clapton – acoustic and electric guitar
- Michael Kamen – keyboards, strings arrangement
- Steve Gadd – drums
- Stephen McLaughlin – percussion
- David Sanborn – alto saxophone

== Charts ==
=== Weekly charts ===
Chart (1992)	Peak position
Australia (ARIA)	23
Belgium (Ultratop 50 Flanders)	11
Belgium (VRT Top 30 Flanders)	12
Canada Top Singles (RPM)	12
Europe (Eurochart Hot 100)	12
France (SNEP)	4
Germany (GfK)	22
Ireland (IRMA)	17
Italy (Musica e dischi)	1
Netherlands (Dutch Top 40)	6
Netherlands (Single Top 100)	7
New Zealand (Recorded Music NZ)	11
Portugal (AFP)	9
Sweden (Sverigetopplistan)	29
Switzerland (Schweizer Hitparade)	16
UK Singles (Official Charts)	30
UK Airplay (Music Week)	42
US Adult Contemporary (Billboard)	47
US Mainstream Rock (Billboard)	20

=== Year-end charts ===
Chart (1992)	Position
Australia (ARIA)	97
Belgium (Ultratop)	64
Canada Top Singles (RPM)	96
Europe (Eurochart Hot 100)	46
Europe (European Hit Radio)	37
Germany (Official German Charts)	137
Netherlands (Dutch Top 40)	44
Netherlands (Single Top 100)	79
Switzerland (Schweizer Hitparade)	75

== Certifications ==
Region	Certification	Certified units/sales
Australia (ARIA)	Gold	35,000^{^}
Italy (FIMI)	Gold	25,000^{*}
^{*} Sales figures based on certification alone.^{^} Shipments figures based on certification alone.

== Release history ==
Region	Date	Format(s)	Label(s)	Ref.
United States	23 June 1992	CD	A&M	
Japan	17 July 1992	Mini-CD	A&M	
Australia	20 July 1992	CD; cassette	A&M	
United Kingdom	17 August 1992	7-inch vinyl; CD; cassette	A&M	

== Reception ==
The song was described by Thomas Edward of Smooth Radio, as "a slick, soulful duet".
