= The Last Ship (album) =

Studio album by Sting
- Released: 20 September 2013
- Genres: Rock, jazz, folk, blues, Celtic, sea shanty
- Length: 45:24
- Labels: A&M, Cherrytree
- Producers: Sting, Rob Mathes

Sting chronology
Live in Berlin (2010)	The Last Ship (2013)	57th & 9th (2016)

Singles from The Last Ship
- 1. "Practical Arrangement" Released: 15 July 2013; 2. "And Yet" Released: 13 August 2013

Professional ratings
Aggregate scores
Source	Rating
Metacritic	66/100
Review scores
Source	Rating
Allmusic	3.5/5 stars
Consequence of Sound	3/5 stars
The Daily Express	2/5
The Daily Telegraph	3/5 stars
The Guardian	3/5 stars
New York Daily News	4/5 stars
PopMatters	7/10 stars
Rolling Stone	3/5 stars

The Last Ship is the eleventh studio album by English musician Sting, released on 20 September 2013 in Germany and on 24 September 2013 in the UK and US. It contains songs written for and inspired by the musical The Last Ship, which was then in production and would premiere in June 2014. The Last Ship is the first full-length LP of original material released by Sting since his 2003 album Sacred Love.

The album, like the musical, takes inspiration from the closing of the shipyards in and around the historic shipbuilding town of Wallsend, where Sting grew up. The album features guest artists with roots in the northeast of England, including Brian Johnson from AC/DC, Jimmy Nail, The Unthanks, The Wilson Family and Kathryn Tickell.

On 5 December 2025, an expanded edition of the album was released, featuring five previously unreleased songs.

== Background ==
The album is inspired by the musical of the same name, which premiered in June 2014, and whose songs were written by Sting. The play explores the themes of homecoming and self-discovery, drawing upon Sting's memories of growing up in the shipbuilding town of Wallsend, along with his reflections on the complexity of relationships, the passage of time and the importance of family and community.

Of the album's twelve songs and the musical's roughly twenty songs, only six are common to both (although the deluxe version of the album includes another three, and the "super deluxe" version includes another four). In some cases, the differences are due to changes to the musical after the album had been recorded, such as the song "What Say You Meg?" being written to replace "Practical Arrangement".

== Commercial performance ==
The Last Ship debuted at No. 13 on the Billboard 200, and No. 6 on the Top Rock Albums chart, selling 20,000 copies in the first week. The album has sold 90,000 copies in the United States as of September 2016.

== Formats ==
The album is available as both a digital and physical release in two configurations: a standard 12-song version (also available on vinyl) and a 2-disc deluxe version with 5 additional tracks. Moreover, a 2-disc super deluxe edition with 20 tracks and special packaging is available.

== Track listing ==
All tracks are written by Sting, except where noted.

Standard and vinyl edition
No.	Title	Writer(s)	Length
1.	"The Last Ship"		3:51
2.	"Dead Man's Boots"		3:30
3.	"And Yet"		3:53
4.	"August Winds"		3:18
5.	"Language of Birds"	Sting, Rob Mathes	3:30
6.	"Practical Arrangement"	Sting, Mathes	3:20
7.	"The Night the Pugilist Learned How to Dance"		4:13
8.	"Ballad of the Great Eastern"	Sting, Mathes, Dominic Miller, Kathryn Tickell, Jo Lawry, Peter Tickell, Ira Coleman	5:15
9.	"What Have We Got?" (featuring Jimmy Nail)	Sting, Jimmy Nail, K. Tickell, P. Tickell, Julian Sutton, Lawry	3:35
10.	"I Love Her But She Loves Someone Else"	Sting, Mathes	3:42
11.	"So to Speak" (featuring Becky Unthank)		4:07
12.	"The Last Ship (Reprise)"		3:20

Deluxe version bonus disc
No.	Title	Writer(s)	Length
1.	"Shipyard" (featuring Jimmy Nail, Brian Johnson and Jo Lawry)	Sting, Mathes, K. Tickell, P. Tickell, Sutton, Lawry	6:01
2.	"It's Not the Same Moon"	Sting, Mathes	2:55
3.	"Hadaway"	Sting, Lawry, K. Tickell, P. Tickell, Sutton	3:18
4.	"Sky Hooks and Tartan Paint" (featuring Brian Johnson)	Sting, Lawry, K. Tickell, P. Tickell, Sutton	3:34
5.	"Show Some Respect"		4:48

Super deluxe package bonus disc
No.	Title	Writer(s)	Length
1.	"Shipyard" (featuring Jimmy Nail, Brian Johnson and Jo Lawry)	Sting, Mathes, K. Tickell, P. Tickell, Sutton, Lawry	6:01
2.	"It's Not the Same Moon"	Sting, Mathes	2:54
3.	"Hadaway"	Sting, Lawry, K. Tickell, P. Tickell, Sutton	3:18
4.	"Jock the Singing Welder"		2:49
5.	"Sky Hooks and Tartan Paint" (featuring Brian Johnson)	Sting, Lawry, K. Tickell, P. Tickell, Sutton	3:36
6.	"Peggy's Song" (featuring Rachel Unthank)		2:39
7.	"Show Some Respect"		4:52
8.	"Practical Arrangement" (Full original duet, featuring Jo Lawry)	Sting, Mathes	4:35

== Personnel ==
- Sting – vocals, acoustic guitar, bass guitar, orchestral bells, cymbal
- Rob Mathes – piano, keyboards, acoustic guitar, background vocals
- Dominic Miller – electric guitar, acoustic guitar, gut string solo guitar ("It's Not the Same Moon")
- Ira Coleman – bass guitar
- Joe Bonadio – drums, percussion
- Peter Tickell – violin, mandolin (solo on "What Have We Got?" and "Show Some Respect")
- Julian Sutton – melodeon
- Kathryn Tickell – violin, Northumbrian smallpipes (solo on "The Last Ship" and "Sky Hooks and Tartan Paint")
- Jo Lawry – vocals ("Shipyard"), duet vocal (on "Practical Arrangement" (Full Original Duet)), background vocals
- Jimmy Nail – vocals ("What Have We Got?" and "Shipyard"), background vocals
- Brian Johnson – vocals ("Shipyard" and "Sky Hooks and Tartan Paint")
- Thomas Bowes – violin (concertmaster)
- Emlyn Singleton – violin (principal second violin)
- Rita Manning, Boguslaw Kostecki, Warren Zielinski, Cathy Thompson, Chris Tombling, Debbie Widdup, Mark Berrow, Gaby Lester, Steve Morris – violin
- Peter Lale – viola (principal)
- Bruce White, Andy Parker – viola
- Anthony Pleeth – cello (principal)
- Martin Loveday, Dave Daniels – cello
- Jon Carnac – clarinet
- Gavin McNaughton – bassoon
- Richard Watkins, David Pyatt, Nicholas Korth, Michael Thompson – French horn
- John Barclay, Kate Moore, Tom Rees-Roberts, Richard Edwards – trumpet
- Richard Edwards – tenor trombone
- Andy Wood – euphonium
- Owen Slade – tuba
- Rachel Unthank – lead vocal ("Peggy's Song"), clogs ("What Have We Got?")
- Becky Unthank – duet vocal ("So to Speak")
- The Wilson Family – group vocals ("The Last Ship", "Ballad of the Great Eastern", "What Have We Got?", "The Last Ship (Reprise)", "Shipyard", "Hadaway", "Sky Hooks and Tartan Paint", "Show Some Respect")
- Alan Stepansky – cello ("It's Not the Same Moon")
- Dave Mann – alto saxophone ("Jock the Singing Welder")
- Aaron Heick – tenor saxophone ("Jock the Singing Welder")
- Roger Rosenberg – baritone saxophone ("Jock the Singing Welder")
- Jeff Kievit – trumpet ("The Last Ship", "Dead Man's Boots", "The Last Ship (Reprise)")
- Tony Kadleck – trumpet ("The Last Ship", "Dead Man's Boots", "The Last Ship (Reprise)")
- Bob Carlisle – French horn ("The Last Ship", "Dead Man's Boots", "The Last Ship (Reprise)")
- Chris Komer – French horn ("The Last Ship", "Dead Man's Boots", "The Last Ship (Reprise)")
- Mike Davis – tenor trombone ("The Last Ship", "Dead Man's Boots", "The Last Ship (Reprise)")
- Richard Harris – euphonium ("The Last Ship", "Dead Man's Boots", "The Last Ship (Reprise)")
- Marcus Rojas – tuba ("The Last Ship", "Dead Man's Boots", "The Last Ship (Reprise)")

Technical

- Sting – production
- Rob Mathes – production, orchestra arrangement and conduction
- Donal Hodgson – recording, mixing
- Peter Cobbin – orchestra recording, additional mixing ("The Last Ship", "Dead Man's Boots", "And Yet", "August Winds", "Language of Birds", "Practical Arrangement", "Ballad of the Great Eastern", "I Love Her But She Loves Someone Else", "The Last Ship (Reprise)")
- Alex Venguer – additional recording
- Jonathan Allen – orchestra recording
- Jill Dell'Abate – production manager
- Isobel Griffiths, Ltd. – orchestra contractor
- Charlotte Matthews – assistant orchestra contractor
- Rich Rich – Pro Tools engineering
- Brett Meyer – Pro Tools engineering
- Paul Pritchard – Pro Tools engineering
- Toby Hulbert – Pro Tools engineering
- Rael Jones – Pro Tools engineering
- Lars Fox – additional engineering and editing
- Angus Cowen – assistant engineering
- Mark Broughton – assistant engineering
- Danny Quatrochi – Sting's guitar technician
- Mike Casteel – music preparation
- Lori Casteel – music preparation
- Dave Hage – music preparation assistant
- Scott Hull – mastering

== Charts and certifications ==
=== Weekly charts ===
Chart (2013)	Peak position
Australian Albums (ARIA)	39
Austrian Albums (Ö3 Austria)	8
Belgian Albums (Ultratop Flanders)	8
Belgian Albums (Ultratop Wallonia)	8
Croatian International Albums (HDU)	3
Danish Albums (Hitlisten)	8
Dutch Albums (Album Top 100)	6
Finnish Albums (Suomen virallinen lista)	25
French Albums (SNEP)	10
German Albums (Offizielle Top 100)	3
Hungarian Albums (MAHASZ)	7
Irish Albums (IRMA)	23
Italian Albums (FIMI)	3
Norwegian Albums (VG-lista)	3
Polish Albums (ZPAV)	1
Portuguese Albums (AFP)	12
Scottish Albums (Official Charts)	17
Spanish Albums (Promusicae)	30
Swedish Albums (Sverigetopplistan)	12
Swiss Albums (Schweizer Hitparade)	9
UK Albums (Official Charts)	14
US Billboard 200	13
US Top Rock Albums (Billboard)	6

=== Year-end charts ===
Chart (2013)	Position
Belgian Albums (Ultratop Flanders)	175
Belgian Albums (Ultratop Wallonia)	126
French Albums (SNEP)	156
German Albums (Offizielle Top 100)	84
Hungarian Albums (MAHASZ)	72
Polish Albums (ZPAV)	9

=== Certifications ===
Region	Certification	Certified units/sales
Poland (ZPAV)	2× Platinum	40,000^{*}
Portugal (AFP)	Gold	7,500^{^}
^{*} Sales figures based on certification alone.^{^} Shipments figures based on certification alone.
