= Seven Days (Sting song) =

1993 single by Sting

Single by Sting

from the album Ten Summoner's Tales
- B-side: "January Stars"
- Released: 12 April 1993
- Length: 4:40 (album version); 4:13 (radio edit)
- Label: A&M
- Songwriter: Sting
- Producers: Sting; Hugh Padgham

Sting singles chronology
| "If I Ever Lose My Faith in You" (1993) | "Seven Days" (1993) | "Fields of Gold" (1993) |

Music video
- "Seven Days" on YouTube

"Seven Days" is a song by English singer-songwriter Sting, released on 12 April 1993 by A&M Records as the second single from his fourth studio album, Ten Summoner's Tales (1993). It was written by Sting and co-produced by him and Hugh Padgham. The song reached the top 30 in the UK and is noted for its quintuple meter time signature and drumming from Vinnie Colaiuta.

== Background ==
When writing "Seven Days", Sting sought to build a song around a reggae-inspired beat in quintuple meter with chord changes akin to music from a Broadway show. Sting stated that "Seven Days" was the first song he wrote in quintuple meter and that it "begged to be played with in a frivolous way." He also reckoned that the song's time signature would challenge his backing band "by asking them to do things that aren't natural."

The song was recorded in (5/8) time at a tempo of 184 beats per minute. For the purpose of making the odd time signature more digestible for the listener, the song utilizes rhythmic displacement in the drums by implying a duple rhythmic organization. The drum pattern spans two measures with drummer Vinnie Colaiuta playing a two bar repeating eighth note figure on the hi-hat where the accents fall on the odd numbered beats for the first measure and even numbered beats on the second measure. Colaiuta commented in a 1993 interview that he "phrased it by playing over the bar line, so the hi-hat pattern resolves every two bars". During both measures, the kick drum and snare drum land on beats one and four respectively. He also overdubbed some brush work during the middle of one of the verses so that the song would "chug a little more and differently".

The verses follow a chord progression of C6/9 – Eb6/9(#11) – Bb6/9 – G9 – F6/9, all of which are built around major triads and ninth chord extensions within the C minor pentatonic scale. A chromatically ascending chord progression is included within the chorus, which lands on the tonic C note at the conclusion of the section. At the song's coda, Sting quotes a line from The Police's "Every Little Thing She Does is Magic" and "O My God". Sting described the lyrics as "a sort of Charles Atlas story; having to face a neanderthal brute for the hand of his loved one. And I think he does, I think he wins in the end."

== Release ==
"Seven Days" is the sixth track on Ten Summoner's Tales and has a duration of 4 minutes and 40 seconds. After the release of "If I Ever Lose My Faith in You", the song was lifted as the album's second single on 12 April 1993 in the United Kingdom. "Seven Days" debuted and peaked at number 25 on the UK Singles Chart and spent a total of four weeks in the top 75.

When asked about the decision to release "Seven Days" as a single, Sting explained that "My philosophy's always been to have a hit that's against the odds rather than designed to be a hit: something that sticks out like a sore thumb on the radio and is a hit because of that, rather than because it just obeyed all the rules. When I've had hits like that - "Russians" was a case in point – it's very satisfying."

With the exception of the UK CD Digipak edition, all versions of the "Seven Days" single featured "January Stars" as a B-side. The song recycles the instrumentation of another track from Ten Summoner's Tales titled "Everybody Laughed But You", which includes a different set of lyrics. A live cover of "Ain't No Sunshine", originally recorded by Bill Withers, was taken from an April 1991 acoustic show at the Buddle Arts Centre in Wallsend and included on the UK CD Digipak single.

Similar to every song on Ten Summoner's Tales with the exception of the European-exclusive track "Everybody Laughed But You", a clip of the band recording "Seven Days" was filmed in the dining room of Sting's home. This footage was later included on the video version of the album and the song's music video.

== Critical reception ==
Several publications gave particular attention to the song's lyrics. Rolling Stone depicted the song's premise as a David and Goliath story and noted the lyrical callback to "Every Little Things She Does is Magic" during the fade-out, which the Baltimore Sun identified as "another number about a man too love-smitten to act on his desire". Entertainment Weekly wrote that the song's "courtship drama affirm[s] what's really good about pop". Tom Moon of The Philadelphia Inquirer described the song as "coy" and highlighted the song's portrayal of a "contest for a woman's love as a stark tale of brains vs. brawn". The Buffalo News linked the song's instrumentation to reggae and broadway music and praised Sting's backing band of Dominic Miller, David Sancious and Vinnie Colaiuta for "seem[ing] comfortable in whatever musical direction Sting takes them".

== Track listing ==
- 7" single
1. "Seven Days" (radio edit) — 4:13
2. "January Stars" — 3:50
- CD single
1. "Seven Days" (radio edit) — 4:13
2. "January Stars" — 3:50
3. "Mad About You" (live) — 5:31
4. "Ain't No Sunshine" (live) — 5:06
- UK CD Digipak single
1. "Seven Days" (radio edit) — 4:13
2. "Islands of Souls" (live) — 8:27
3. "The Wild Wild Sea" (live) — 6:02
4. "The Soul Cages" (live) — 6:17

== Charts ==
Weekly chart performance for "Seven Days"
| Chart (1993) | Peak position |
|---|---|
| Australia (Kent Music Report) | 119 |
| Europe (Eurochart Hot 100) | 64 |
| Europe (European Hit Radio) | 33 |
| Italy (Musica e dischi) | 18 |
| UK Singles (Official Charts) | 25 |
| UK Airplay (Music Week) | 3 |

== Release history ==
Release dates and formats for "Seven Days"
| Region | Date | Format(s) | Label(s) | Ref. |
|---|---|---|---|---|
| United Kingdom | 12 April 1993 | 7-inch vinyl; CD; cassette | A&M | |
| Australia | 26 April 1993 | CD; cassette | A&M | |
