= When We Dance =

1994 single by Sting

Single by Sting

from the album Fields of Gold: The Best of Sting 1984–1994
- Released: 17 October 1994
- Studio: Lake House (Wiltshire)
- Length: 5:59
- Label: A&M
- Songwriter: Sting
- Producers: Hugh Padgham; Sting

Sting singles chronology
| "Nothing 'Bout Me" (1994) | "When We Dance" (1994) | "This Cowboy Song" (1995) |

Music video
- "When We Dance" on YouTube

"When We Dance" is a song by English musician Sting. It was released as a single on 17 October 1994 by A&M Records and is one of two new tracks included on his first greatest hits album, Fields of Gold: The Best of Sting 1984–1994 (1994), alongside "This Cowboy Song". The song was co-produced by Sting with Hugh Padgham, and became his only solo top-10 hit in his native UK and reached the top 40 in five other countries. It was promoted with a music video directed by Howard Greenhalgh.

== Background ==
Described by Sting as a "generic ballad", "When We Dance" was written specifically to be included as a new track for the Fields of Gold compilation. The song reportedly took a year to write: "I had the melody around for a whole year before I thought of what to do with it... Then it just fell in place. It wasn't one of those songs written in five minutes."

Upon its release, "When We Dance" was added to the playlists of radio stations across 12 European countries, with 50% of all radio stations in the United Kingdom adding the song. In the process, it became the most added song to European radio stations during the week of 29 October 1994, resulting in a debut of No. 22 on the European Hit Radio chart published by Music & Media. It later peaked at number 9 in the UK, becoming Sting's only top-10 solo single in his home country. "When We Dance" also reached the top 10 in Canada (number 10) and Ireland (number 9). The song was less successful in the US, peaking at number 38.

== Critical reception ==
Larry Flick from Billboard magazine complimented the song as a "lovely pop ballad, which rides a wonderful contrast between poignance and romance. Sting has rarely sounded so warm and engaging, swirling around lilting keyboards and delicate acoustic strumming. Comfortably deep in the pocket of current radio trends without sounding contrived, richly produced single will likely meet with instant and ardent approval at several formats." Cashbox felt that the single "lacked the punch his earliest solo material had" and expressed disappointment over Sting's perceived pivot toward adult contemporary music. They also identified a "pleasant peacefulness" to the song they anticipated would become endearing to listeners.

== Live performances ==
In March 2026, Sting performed the song as part of a live concert titled "Sounds like Art" he gave at the Rijksmuseum in Amsterdam.

== Track listing ==
All tracks written by Sting.

- CD1
1. "When We Dance" (Edit) – 4:55
2. "Fortress Around Your Heart" (Hugh Padgham Remix) – 4:10
3. "When We Dance" (Album Version) – 5:59
4. "If You Love Somebody Set Them Free" (Soulpower Mix) – 7:00
- CD2
1. "When We Dance" (Edit) – 4:55
2. "If You Love Somebody Set Them Free" (Soulpower Radio Mix) – 4:34
3. "If You Love Somebody Set Them Free" (Soulpower Deep Dub) – 8:19
4. "If You Love Somebody Set Them Free" (Soulpower Hip Hop Mix) – 5:37
- Maxi–single (Europe)
1. "When We Dance" (Edit) – 4:55
2. "Fortress Around Your Heart" (Hugh Padgham Remix) – 4:10
3. "If You Love Somebody Set Them Free" (Soulpower Mix) – 7:00
4. "If You Love Somebody Set Them Free" (Soulpower Deep Dub) – 8:19

== Charts ==
=== Weekly charts ===
| Chart (1994) | Peak position |
|---|---|
| Australia (ARIA) | 110 |
| Belgium (Ultratop 50 Flanders) | 35 |
| Canada Top Singles (RPM) | 10 |
| Europe (European AC Radio) | 1 |
| Europe (European Hit Radio) | 2 |
| Finland (Suomen virallinen lista) | 9 |
| Germany (GfK) | 51 |
| Iceland (Íslenski Listinn Topp 40) | 12 |
| Ireland (IRMA) | 9 |
| Israel (IBA) | 30 |
| Italy (Musica e dischi) | 11 |
| Netherlands (Single Top 100) | 32 |
| New Zealand (Recorded Music NZ) | 50 |
| Sweden (Sverigetopplistan) | 34 |
| Switzerland (Schweizer Hitparade) | 42 |
| UK Singles (Official Charts) | 9 |
| UK Airplay (Music Week) | 6 |
| US Billboard Hot 100 | 38 |
| US Adult Contemporary (Billboard) | 12 |

=== Year-end charts ===
| Chart (1994) | Position |
|---|---|
| UK Singles (OCC) | 139 |

== Release history ==
| Region | Date | Format(s) | Label(s) | Ref. |
|---|---|---|---|---|
| United Kingdom | 17 October 1994 | 12-inch vinyl; CD1; cassette | A&M | |
| Australia | 31 October 1994 | CD; cassette | A&M; Polydor | |
| Japan | 2 November 1994 | Mini-CD | A&M | |
| Japan | 1 January 1995 | Maxi-CD | A&M | |
