= The Soul Cages =

Studio album by Sting
- Released: 21 January 1991
- Recorded: April–November 1990
- Studios: Studio Guillaume Tell (Paris); Villa Salviati (Migliarino)
- Genre: Pop rock
- Length: 48:11
- Label: A&M
- Producers: Hugh Padgham; Sting

Sting chronology
Nada como el sol (1988)	The Soul Cages (1991)	Ten Summoner's Tales (1993)

Singles from The Soul Cages
- 1. "All This Time" Released: 31 December 1990; 2. "Mad About You" Released: 18 February 1991; 3. "The Soul Cages" Released: 22 April 1991 (UK); 4. "Why Should I Cry for You" Released: 22 April 1991 (Japan)

Professional ratings
Review scores
Source	Rating
AllMusic	4/5 stars
Chicago Tribune	2/4 stars
Robert Christgau	(dud)
Entertainment Weekly	C
Los Angeles Times	3.5/5 stars
NME	4/10
Orlando Sentinel	2/5 stars
The Windsor Star	B

The Soul Cages is the third full-length studio album by English musician Sting. Released on 21 January 1991, it became Sting's second No. 1 album on the UK Albums Chart.

It spawned four singles: "All This Time", "Mad About You", "The Soul Cages" and "Why Should I Cry for You". Both "All This Time" and "Why Should I Cry for You" were included on Sting's 1994 compilation album Fields of Gold: The Best of Sting 1984–1994; "Mad About You" was also included on the international version of the compilation. The title track won the first Grammy Award for Best Rock Song at the 34th Annual Grammy Awards in 1992. The Soul Cages was also mixed with QSound, a technology that creates 3D audio effects on stereo sound systems.

On 15 January 2021, an expanded version of The Soul Cages was released to celebrate its 30th anniversary. Along with the original nine tracks, this new edition includes 13 bonus tracks that consist of remixes, extended mixes and a pair of songs sung in Spanish and Italian incarnations.

== Background ==
The Soul Cages is a concept album focused on the death of Sting's father Ernest Sumner. Sting had developed a writer's block shortly after his father's death in 1987; the episode lasted several years, until he was able to overcome his affliction by dealing with the death of his father through music. Most of the songs have motifs related to sailing or the seas; Sting wrote in his autobiography Broken Music that his father had always regretted not becoming a sailor. There are also references to Newcastle, the part of England where Sting grew up.

"I lived next to a shipyard when I was young and it was a very powerful image of this huge ship towering above the house. Tapping into that was a godsend – I began with that and the album just flowed." – Sting

Given his experience of writer's block, Sting did not have any finished songs or arrangements upon entering the studio, unlike previous albums. After two weeks of rehearsing his existing song ideas with his line-up of musicians – Dominic Miller on guitar, Kenny Kirkland on keyboards and Manu Katché on drums – together they moulded these ideas into proper songs in the studio, either through arranging them or recording jams that could be edited into a song. They spent six weeks doing the basic tracks at Studio Guillaume Tell in Paris, before hiring the Le Voyageur II mobile studio for overdubs and vocals in Villa Salviati in Migliarino, Italy. It was Sting's first solo album to be co-produced by Hugh Padgham.

Reflecting on the album in 1993, Sting said that The Soul Cages had a "very narrow" and "personal focus" that was largely centered around his own personal life, an approach he attempted to shift from with his follow-up album, Ten Summoner's Tales.

== Release ==
At the time this album appeared, the music industry was primarily using CD longboxes for packaging in North America. The original shipments of the album were packaged in a longbox containing a multi-panel Digipak. Between 200,000 and 300,000 copies of the album were distributed in this package, which according to an executive for A&M Records roughly cost the company "an additional $50,000 - $75,000."

From 1 February 1991 onwards, A&M Records instead placed the album in packaging developed by AGI Inc. known as the Digitrak, a form of packaging similar to the Digipak that protected the contents of the album with shrink wrap on the exterior and two plastic tracks within the paperboard panels. This format had been reviewed by the National Recycling Coalition through a study on alternative packaging for the music industry. AGI was unable to distribute the album in this packaging any earlier than 1 February due to logistical issues in manufacturing a sufficient number of plastic tracks for the Digitrak. As Sting's tour was started to begin that month, A&M Records decided against delaying the album entirely and settling on longbox packaging for the initial shipment of records. Certain music retail chains, including Music Plus, had originally planned on not carrying the album if it had been exclusively packaged in a jewel case.

Studio Brussel promoted the album in Belgium by featuring all ten of the album's tracks on its radio programs over a five-day period and also airing an interview with Sting. The cover painting was created by the Scottish artist Steven Campbell.

Until the release of Symphonicities in July 2010, The Soul Cages was the only studio album by Sting not to feature a photograph of himself on the front cover, although he does appear on the back cover of both albums.

== Track listing ==
All tracks are written by Sting.

Side one
No.	Title	Length
1.	"Island of Souls"	6:41
2.	"All This Time"	4:54
3.	"Mad About You"	3:53
4.	"Jeremiah Blues (Part 1)"	4:54
5.	"Why Should I Cry for You"	4:46

Side two
No.	Title	Length
6.	"Saint Agnes and the Burning Train"	2:43
7.	"The Wild Wild Sea"	6:41
8.	"The Soul Cages"	5:51
9.	"When the Angels Fall"	7:48
Total length:		48:11

== Personnel ==
Adapted from the album's liner notes.

- Sting – lead vocals, bass, Synclavier, mandolin, arrangements
- Kenny Kirkland – keyboards
- David Sancious – keyboards
- Dominic Miller – guitars
- Manu Katché – drums
- Skip Burney – percussion
- Ray Cooper – percussion
- Munyungo Jackson – percussion
- Vinx De'Jon Parrette – percussion
- Bill Summers – percussion
- Tony Vacca – percussion
- Branford Marsalis – tenor saxophone, soprano saxophone (3, 4, 8)
- Paola Paparelle – oboe
- Kathryn Tickell – Northumbrian smallpipes

=== Production ===
- Produced by Hugh Padgham and Sting
- QSound production assistants – Brian Cowieson and Scott Willing
- Engineered by Hugh Padgham
- Mixed by Hugh Padgham at The Town House (London, England) and A&M Studios (Hollywood, California)
- Assistant engineers – Simon Osbourne, Yves Jaget, Bruce Keene, Al Stone, Brian Scheuble, and Efren Herrera
- Technical assistant – Danny Quatrochi
- Mastered by Bob Ludwig at Masterdisk (New York City, New York)
- Design – Richard Frankel and Len Peltier
- Front cover painting and inside illustrations – Steven Campbell
- Photography – Guzman

== Singles ==
- "All This Time" (1990) – No. 5 US Billboard Hot 100, No. 1 US Mainstream Rock, No. 1 US Modern Rock, No. 9 US Adult Contemporary, No. 22 UK Singles Chart
- "Mad About You" (1991) – No. 56 UK Singles Chart
- "Why Should I Cry For You" (1991) – No. 32 US Mainstream Rock
- "The Soul Cages" (1991) – No. 7 US Mainstream Rock, No. 9 US Modern Rock, No. 57 UK Singles Chart

== Charts ==
=== Weekly charts ===
Weekly chart performance for The Soul Cages
Chart (1991)	Peak position
Australian ARIA Albums Chart	3
Ö3 Austria Top 40 Longplay	3
Canadian RPM100	1
Dutch Album Top 100	1
French SNEP Albums Chart	7
German Media Control Albums Chart	1
Hungarian Albums (MAHASZ)	17
Japanese Oricon Albums Chart	4
New Zealand RIANZ Albums Chart	4
Norwegian VG-lista Albums Chart	2
Spanish PROMUSICAE Albums Chart	4
Swedish Sverigetopplistan Albums Chart	4
Swiss Hitparade Albums Top 100	1
UK Albums (OCC)	1
US Radio & Records AOR Albums Chart	2
US Billboard 200	2

=== Year-end charts ===
1991 year-end chart performance for The Soul Cages
Chart (1991)	Position
Austrian Albums Chart	26
Canadian Albums Chart	10
Dutch Albums Chart	30
French Albums Chart	36
Japanese Albums Chart	85
Swiss Albums Chart	19
UK Albums Chart	82
US Billboard 200	46

== Certifications and sales ==
Certifications and sales for The Soul Cages
Region	Certification	Certified units/sales
Australia (ARIA)	Gold	35,000^{^}
Austria (IFPI Austria)	Gold	25,000^{*}
Belgium (BRMA)	Gold	40,000
Canada (Music Canada)	Platinum	100,000^{^}
Finland (Musiikkituottajat)	Gold	26,040
France (SNEP)	Platinum	300,000^{*}
Germany (BVMI)	Platinum	500,000^{^}
Italy	—	500,000
Japan (RIAJ)	Gold	185,820
Spain (Promusicae)	Platinum	100,000^{^}
Switzerland (IFPI Switzerland)	Platinum	50,000^{^}
United Kingdom (BPI)	Gold	100,000^{^}
United States (RIAA)	Platinum	1,000,000^{^}
^{*} Sales figures based on certification alone.^{^} Shipments figures based on certification alone.
