= The Soul Cages (song) =

Single by Sting

from the album The Soul Cages
- Released: 22 April 1991
- Genre: Rock
- Songwriters: Dominic Miller; Sting
- Producer: Hugh Padgham

Sting singles chronology
"Mad About You" (1991)	"The Soul Cages" (1991)	"Why Should I Cry for You" (1991)

Music video
- "The Soul Cages" on YouTube

"The Soul Cages" is a song by English singer-songwriter Sting, released in April 1991 as the third commercial single from his third album The Soul Cages (1991). It was written by Sting with Dominic Miller, produced by Hugh Padgham and became the first song to win the Grammy Award for Best Rock Song at the 34th Annual Grammy Awards.

== Reception ==
Professional ratings
Review scores
Source	Rating
AllMusic	2/5 stars

Pan-European magazine Music & Media called it the "most rocking release so far", while noting the "occasional heavy guitar gives the song an extra dimension." In a retrospective review of The Soul Cages for Ultimate Classic Rock, Anne Zaleski called it a "hulking dirge with an '80s AOR hangover, courtesy of Dominic Miller's sturdy electric guitar strokes, evocative sax from Branford Marsalis and organ from David Sancious".

== Track listings ==
According to the 12" single liner notes:

1. "The Soul Cages" – 5:51
2. "Walking In Your Footsteps" (live) – 4:51
3. "Don't Stand So Close to Me" (live) – 4:59
4. "Ooh La La Hugh" – 2:46

== Charts ==
Chart (1991)	Peak position
Australia (Kent Music Report)	135
Netherlands (Single Top 100)	77
UK Singles (OCC)	57
UK Airplay (Music Week)	47
US Alternative Airplay (Billboard)	9
US Mainstream Rock (Billboard)	7

== Awards ==
Grammy Awards
Year	Award	Result	Ref.
1992	Best Rock Song	Won	
