= If You Love Somebody Set Them Free =

1985 single by Sting

- 7-inch vinyl single

Single by Sting

from the album The Dream of the Blue Turtles
- B-side: "Another Day"
- Released: 28 May 1985
- Recorded: 1985
- Genre: Pop rock; jazz fusion; R&B
- Length: 4:14
- Label: A&M
- Songwriter: Sting
- Producers: Sting; Peter Smith

Sting singles chronology
"Spread a Little Happiness" (1982)	"If You Love Somebody Set Them Free" (1985)	"Love Is the Seventh Wave" (1985)

Music video
- "Sting - If You Love Somebody Set Them Free" on YouTube

"If You Love Somebody Set Them Free" is the first single by the English musician Sting from his debut solo studio album, The Dream of the Blue Turtles (1985). It is also the opening track of the album, and is featured on Fields of Gold: The Best of Sting 1984–1994 (1994) as well as The Very Best of Sting & The Police (1997).

== Background ==
Sting said that the song was written as a foil to the Police's 1983 song, "Every Breath You Take", explaining that the latter's themes of surveillance, ownership, and possession were diametrically opposed to "If You Love Somebody Set Them Free".

"Set Them Free" is the opposite, saying that if you love somebody, let them alone. There is a nasty side to it too. It's got quite a swagger to it, and a kick in the teeth.

A demo version of this song was recorded with Phil Collins as session musician.

== Release and other appearances ==
A&M Records released "If You Love Somebody Set Them Free" in May 1985 with "Another Day" as the B-side. UK, US and French 12" singles also contain two remixes of "If You Love Somebody Set Them Free": the "Jellybean Mix" by John "Jellybean" Benitez and the "Torch Mix" by William Orbit of Torch Song.

The single peaked at number three on the US Billboard Hot 100, number 1 on the US R&B chart, number one on the US Album Rock Tracks chart for three weeks, number 26 on the UK Singles Chart, and number 18 on the Australian Kent Music Report singles chart. The song was also performed at The Brits in February 1995 with M People. He duetted on the song with the band's lead singer, Heather Small and this track was given the dance treatment by the band who were also backed by a 100-strong Gospel Choir at the Earls Court Arena during the annual music awards show.

Live performances of the song are featured on the DVD edition of Bring On the Night and on the CD and DVD editions of ...All This Time.

In 2019, Sting rerecorded a new Dance-centric version of the single, one of six songs produced by Dave Aude for Sting's My Songs set, which was remixed by Tom Stephan, among others.

== Reception ==
Cash Box called the song "a satisfying jazz/R&B/R&R exercise" with "sophisticated production and poignant lyric."

== Music video ==
The music video was directed by Godley and Creme in 1985. It was shot in Paris on a soundstage, with each of the musicians performing separately and the footage then overlaid onto the final version.

== Track listings ==
- 7" US and Canada single (AM-2738)
1. "If You Love Somebody Set Them Free" – 4:14
2. "Another Day" – 3:59
- 12" US single (SP-12132)
1. "If You Love Somebody Set Them Free" (Extended Remix by John "Jellybean" Benitez) – 8:00
2. "If You Love Somebody Set Them Free" – 4:14
3. "If You Love Somebody Set Them Free" (Torch Song Mix, Produced by William Orbit) – 4:52
4. "Another Day" – 3:59
- 12" US promotional single (SP-17324)
1. "If You Love Somebody Set Them Free" – 4:14
2. "If You Love Somebody Set Them Free" – 4:14
- 12" France single (392 018-1)
1. "If You Love Somebody Set Them Free" (Torch Song Mix, Produced by William Orbit) – 4:52
2. "If You Love Somebody Set Them Free" (Remix by John "Jellybean" Benitez) – 8:00
3. "If You Love Somebody Set Them Free" – 4:14
4. "Another Day" – 3:59

== Charts ==
=== Weekly charts ===
Chart (1985)	Peak position
Australia (Kent Music Report)	18
Belgium (Ultratop 50 Flanders)	13
Canada Top Singles (RPM)	5
Finland (Suomen virallinen lista)	21
France (SNEP)	23
Ireland (IRMA)	15
Israel (IBA)	2
Italy (Musica e dischi)	3
Netherlands (Dutch Top 40)	35
Netherlands (Single Top 100)	38
New Zealand (Recorded Music NZ)	6
Sweden (Sverigetopplistan)	19
Switzerland (Schweizer Hitparade)	28
UK Singles (Official Charts)	26
UK Airplay (Music & Media)	5
US Billboard Hot 100	3
US Adult Contemporary (Billboard)	39
US Dance Club Songs (Billboard); Remix	10
US Hot R&B/Hip-Hop Songs (Billboard)	17
US Mainstream Rock (Billboard)	1

Chart (1994–1995)	Peak position
UK Club Chart (Music Week)	57
UK Pop Tip Club Chart (Music Week)	2

"If You Love Somebody Set Them Free 2019"
Chart (2019)	Peak position
US Dance Club Songs (Billboard)	1

=== Year-end charts ===
Chart (1985)	Position
US Top Pop Singles (Billboard)	55

"If You Love Somebody Set Them Free 2019"
Chart (2019)	Position
US Dance Club Songs (Billboard)	38

== Certifications ==
Region	Certification	Certified units/sales
Canada (Music Canada)	Gold	50,000^{^}
^{^} Shipments figures based on certification alone.

== See also ==
- List of Billboard number-one dance songs of 2019
