= Mad About You (Sting song) =

Single by Sting

from the album The Soul Cages
- Released: 18 February 1991
- Length: 3:53
- Label: A&M
- Songwriter: Sting
- Producers: Sting and Peter Smith

Sting singles chronology
"All This Time" (1990)	"Mad About You" (1991)	"The Soul Cages" (1991)

Music video
- Mad About You on YouTube

"Mad About You" is a song by English artist Sting, released in March 1991 by A&M Records as the second single from his third studio album The Soul Cages (1991). The song’s lyrics are based on the story of King David from the book of Samuel. The single did not match the success of its predecessor, "All This Time", only reaching number 56 on the UK Singles Chart and missing the US Billboard Hot 100 completely.

== Critical reception ==
Pan-European magazine Music & Media wrote: "Mostly he sounds calculated, but Sting can still be a thrill. This second single, the best track from his new album The Soul Cages, is destined for greatness." Billboard described the song as a "delicate, well-worded midtempo pop song" and thought that the single remix possessed "a beefier backbeat".

== Live performances ==
In March 2026, Sting performed the song as part of a live concert titled Sounds like Art he gave at the Rijksmuseum in Amsterdam.

== Charts ==
Weekly chart performance for "Mad About You"
Chart (1991)	Peak position
Australia (Kent Music Report)	109
Canada Top Singles (RPM)	71
Germany (GfK)	59
Israel (Israeli Singles Chart)	2
Italy (Musica e dischi)	13
Netherlands (Single Top 100)	44
UK Singles (Official Charts)	56
UK Airplay (Music Week)	21

Annual chart rankings for "Mad About You"
Chart (1991)	Position
Italy (Musica e dischi)	61
