= All This Time (Sting song) =

1990 single by Sting

Single by Sting

from the album The Soul Cages
- B-side: "I Miss You Kate"; "King of Pain" (live)
- Released: 31 December 1990
- Length: 4:55
- Label: A&M
- Songwriter: Sting
- Producer: Hugh Padgham

Sting singles chronology
"They Dance Alone" (1988)	"All This Time" (1990)	"Mad About You" (1991)

Audio
- "All This Time" (edit) on YouTube

"All This Time" is a song by English musician Sting. It was released as the first single from his third studio album, The Soul Cages (1991), on 31 December 1990 by A&M Records. The song was a chart success, especially in North America, reaching No. 5 on the US Billboard Hot 100, topping the Billboard Album Rock Tracks and Modern Rock Tracks charts, and peaking at number one on Canada's RPM 100 Hit Tracks chart.

== Lyrics ==
The lyrics provide a reference to the death of Sting's father Ernest Sumner, symbolized by the image of a young boy, Billy, who wishes to bury his father at sea once he dies instead of going through the Catholic rites:

"Two priests are at Billy's father's deathbed—he's been injured in a shipyard accident—and Billy doesn't want the ritual that's being served up, he wants to take his father and bury him at sea."

— Sting, Q, February 1991

Despite the dark lyrics, the uptempo tune of the song foils their macabre undertone:

"It's about the death of my father, so it's pretty dark as a record but on this song the words are foiled by this fairly jolly tune. That's something I like to do quite a lot, combine dark subject matter with up music. No, it's not based on a dream. The lyrics seem surreal, but they are all images I remembered from my home town: ferries, priests, shire horses. I grew up by the shipyards. I just wanted to escape. I suppose it was quite a surreal place, though. It is the landscape of my dreams"

— Sting, Independent On Sunday, 11/94

The imaginary character, Billy, is also referred to in the lyrics to the opening song on The Soul Cages, "Island Of Souls".

== Music video ==
The music video depicts the wry, black humour of the song and is set aboard a cruise ship that constantly tilts from side to side. It features Melanie Griffith as a manicurist and Sting's wife Trudie Styler dressed as a French maid and recreates the overcrowded stateroom scene from the Marx Brothers' 1935 film A Night at the Opera. As Sting's stateroom slowly fills with people, the two priests mentioned in the lyrics emerge from a bathtub, to the terror of a boy who is using it at the time, and the antics on the ship prompt a man on a dock to abandon his effort to drown himself and come aboard instead.

The last verse is punctuated by a vaudeville performer attempting to do a dance routine while the spotlight keeps moving away from him; he finally gets fed up and storms off the stage. At the end of the video, when the priests enter the room, Sting throws his luggage out of the stateroom's porthole, jumps after it and sinks slowly into the ocean as a lifebuoy is thrown toward him.

== Performances ==
"All This Time" opened the set on The Soul Cages Tour. After this, the song was not performed again until 2000 during the Brand New Day Tour. The song lent its name to the ...All This Time live album which was recorded in September 2001 at Sting's villa in Tuscany. In March 2026, Sting performed the song as part of a live concert titled Sounds like Art he gave at the Rijksmuseum in Amsterdam.

== Track listings ==
- 7-inch and cassette single
1. "All This Time"
2. "I Miss You Kate" (instrumental)
- 12-inch and CD single
1. "All This Time"
2. "I Miss You Kate" (instrumental)
3. "King of Pain" (live)
- Japanese maxi-CD single
1. "All This Time" (edit)
2. "King of Pain" (live)
3. "We'll Be Together" (extended mix)
4. "Someone to Watch Over Me"
5. "I Miss You Kate"

== Charts ==
=== Weekly charts ===
Weekly chart performance for "All This Time"
Chart (1991)	Peak position
Australia (ARIA)	26
Austria (Ö3 Austria Top 40)	23
Belgium (Ultratop 50 Flanders)	22
Canada Top Singles (RPM)	1
Canada Adult Contemporary (RPM)	4
Denmark (IFPI)	10
Europe (Eurochart Hot 100)	23
Europe (European Hit Radio)	1
Finland (Suomen virallinen lista)	4
France (SNEP)	21
Germany (GfK)	23
Ireland (IRMA)	13
Israel (IBA)	1
Italy (Musica e dischi)	4
Luxembourg (Radio Luxembourg)	18
Netherlands (Dutch Top 40)	13
Netherlands (Single Top 100)	22
New Zealand (Recorded Music NZ)	26
Norway (VG-lista)	7
Portugal (AFP)	4
Switzerland (Schweizer Hitparade)	18
UK Singles (Official Charts)	22
UK Airplay (Music Week)	4
US Billboard Hot 100	5
US Adult Contemporary (Billboard)	9
US Alternative Airplay (Billboard)	1
US Mainstream Rock (Billboard)	1
US Cash Box Top 100	5
US AOR (Radio & Records)	1
Zimbabwe (ZIMA)	2

=== Year-end charts ===
Year-end chart performance for "All This Time"
Chart (1991)	Position
Canada Top Singles (RPM)	9
Canada Adult Contemporary (RPM)	47
Europe (Eurochart Hot 100)	96
Europe (European Hit Radio)	11
Germany (Media Control)	80
Netherlands (Dutch Top 40)	128
US Billboard Hot 100	92
US Album Rock Tracks (Billboard)	16
US Modern Rock Tracks (Billboard)	18
US Cash Box Top 100	48

== Release history ==
Release dates and formats for "All This Time"
Region	Date	Format(s)	Label(s)	Ref(s).
United Kingdom	31 December 1990	7-inch vinyl; 12-inch vinyl; CD; cassette	A&M	
Japan	21 January 1991	Mini-CD; maxi-CD	A&M	

== See also ==
- List of European number-one airplay songs of the 1990s
- List of number-one mainstream rock hits (U.S.)
- List of number-one modern rock hits of 1991 (U.S.)
- List of RPM number-one singles of 1991
