= List of awards and nominations received by Sting =

Sting awards and nominations
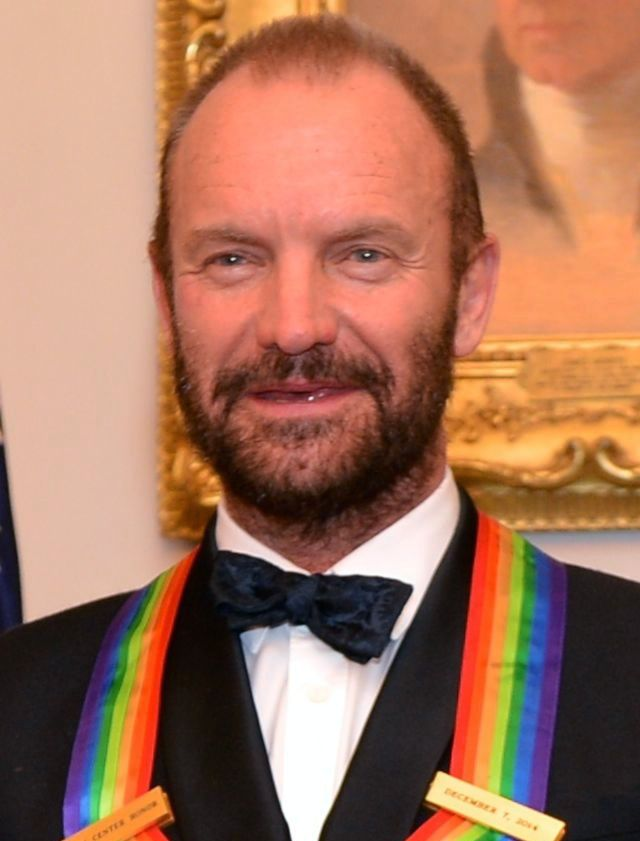
- Sting with his 2014 Kennedy Center Honoree Medallion
Awards and nominations
Award	Wins	Nominations
American Music Awards	25	37
Grammy Awards	17	38
Latin Grammy Awards	1	2
MTV Video Music Awards	2	14

Gordon Matthew Thomas Sumner CBE (born 2 October 1951), known as Sting, is an English musician and actor.

== General ==
Sting and his wife Trudie received the Courage of Conscience Award for their commitment to the environment through the establishment of the Rainforest Foundation; to human rights in China through the documentary film on Tiananmen Square; and to peace and social justice through the powerful gift of song. In 2000, Sting had a star unveiled on the Hollywood Walk of Fame.

In the Queen's Birthday Honours 2003 Sting was appointed a Commander of The Most Excellent Order of the British Empire (CBE) for services to the Music Industry.

In 2007, the French government awarded Sting (along with Police bandmates Andy Summers and Stewart Copeland) as Knight of the Order of Arts and Letters (Chevalier de l'ordre des Arts et des Lettres).

He received the Polar Music Prize in 2017.

In 2019, Sting was the recipient of the Global Citizen Prize for Artist of the Year.

In 2023, Sting was awarded a fellowship by the Ivors Academy. Also in that year he was awarded the Freedom of the Borough by the North Tyneside Council.

== Academy Awards ==
Year	Nominee / work	Award	Result
2000	"My Funny Friend and Me" (from The Emperor's New Groove)	Best Original Song	Nominated
2001	"Until..." (from Kate & Leopold)	Best Original Song	Nominated
2003	"You Will Be My Ain True Love" (from Cold Mountain with Alison Krauss)	Best Original Song	Nominated
2016	"The Empty Chair" (from Jim: The James Foley Story)	Best Original Song	Nominated

== American Music Awards ==
Year	Nominee / work	Award	Result
2016	Himself	Award of Merit	Won

== American Screenwriters Association ==
Year	Nominee / work	Award	Result
2004	Himself	David Angell Humanitarian Award	Won

== Annie Awards ==
Year	Nominee / work	Award	Result
2001	Perfect World	Outstanding Individual Achievement for a Song in an Animated Production	Won

== BMI London Awards ==
Year	Nominee / work	Award	Result
2016	Himself	Icon Award	Won

== Blockbuster Entertainment Awards ==
Year	Nominee / work	Award	Result
2001	Himself	Favorite Male Artist	Nominated
--	Himself	Favorite Pop Artist	Nominated
--	Himself	Favorite Rock Artist	Nominated

== Brit Awards ==
Year	Nominee / work	Award	Result
1988	Nothing Like the Sun	Best British Album	Won
1994	Himself	British Male Solo Artist	Won
--	Ten Summoner's Tales	MasterCard British Album	Nominated
--	Fields of Gold	Best British Video	Nominated
1997	Himself	Best British Male	Nominated
2000	Himself	Best British Male	Nominated
2002	Himself	Outstanding Contribution to Music	Won

== Broadcast Film Critics Association Awards ==
Year	Nominee / work	Award	Result
2001	My Funny Friend and Me	Best Song	Won
2002	Until	Best Song	Nominated

== Billboard Music Awards ==
Year	Nominee / work	Award	Result
1993	Himself	Top Adult Contemporary Artist	Nominated
2003	Himself	Century Award	Won

== CMT Music Awards ==
Year	Nominee / work	Award	Result
2007	Always on Your Side (feat. Sheryl Crow)	Country Video of the Year	Nominated
2012	If I Ever Lose My Faith in You (feat. Vince Gill)	CMT Performance of the Year	Nominated

== Classic Rock Roll of Honour Awards ==
Year	Nominee / work	Award	Result	Ref.
2016	Summer 2015 Tour	Tour of the Year	Nominated	
2016	57th & 9th	Album of the Year	Nominated	
2017	Live at the Olympia Paris	Best New Live Album or Video	Nominated	

== Denmark GAFFA Awards ==
Year	Nominee / work	Award	Result	Ref.
1994	Himself	Best Foreign Solo Act	Nominated	

== Golden Globe Awards ==
Year	Nominee / work	Award	Result
1999	The Mighty	Best Original Song	Nominated
2001	My Funny Friend and Me	Best Original Song	Nominated
2002	Until	Best Original Song	Won
2004	You Will Be My Ain True Love	Best Original Song	Nominated

== Grammy Awards ==
Year	Nominee / work	Award	Result
1981	"Reggatta de Blanc"	Best Rock Instrumental Performance	Won
1982	"Behind My Camel"	Best Rock Instrumental Performance	Won
1982	"Don't Stand So Close to Me"	Best Rock Performance by a Duo or Group with Vocal	Won
1984	Synchronicity	Album of the Year	Nominated
1984	"Every Breath You Take"	Song of the Year	Won
1984	"Every Breath You Take"	Record of the Year	Nominated
1984	"Every Breath You Take"	Best Pop Performance by a Duo or Group with Vocal	Won
1984	"Synchronicity II"	Best Rock Performance by a Duo or Group with Vocal	Won
1984	"Brimstone and Treacle"	Best Rock Instrumental Performance	Won
1986	The Dream of the Blue Turtles	Best Engineered Recording	Nominated
1986	The Dream of the Blue Turtles	Best Jazz Instrumental Performance	Nominated
1986	The Dream of the Blue Turtles	Album of the Year	Nominated
1986	The Dream of the Blue Turtles	Best Male Pop Vocal Performance	Nominated
1986	"Money for Nothing"	Song of the Year	Nominated
1987	Bring On the Night	Best Music Video, Long Form	Won
1988	Bring on the Night	Best Male Pop Vocal Performance	Won
1989	"Be Still My Beating Heart"	Song of the Year	Nominated
1989	"Be Still My Beating Heart"	Best Male Pop Vocal Performance	Nominated
1989	...Nothing Like the Sun	Album of the Year	Nominated
1992	"The Soul Cages"	Best Rock Song	Won
1994	"If I Ever Lose My Faith in You"	Song of the Year	Nominated
1994	"If I Ever Lose My Faith in You"	Record of the Year	Nominated
1994	"If I Ever Lose My Faith in You"	Best Male Pop Vocal Performance	Won
1994	Ten Summoner's Tales	Album of the Year	Nominated
1994	Ten Summoner's Tales	Best Music Video, Long Form	Won
1994	Ten Summoner's Tales	Best Engineered Album, Non-Classical	Won
1994	"Demolition Man"	Best Rock Solo Vocal Performance	Nominated
1995	"All For Love" (with Bryan Adams & Rod Stewart)	Best Pop Collaboration with Vocals	Nominated
1996	"When We Dance"	Best Male Pop Vocal Performance	Nominated
1997	Mercury Falling	Best Pop Vocal Album	Nominated
1997	"Let Your Soul Be Your Pilot"	Best Male Pop Vocal Performance	Nominated
1998	"I'm So Happy I Can't Stop Crying" (with Toby Keith)	Best Country Collaboration with Vocals	Nominated
1999	"You Were Meant for Me"	Best Male Pop Vocal Performance	Nominated
2000	Brand New Day	Best Male Pop Vocal Performance	Won
2000	Brand New Day	Best Pop Vocal Album	Won
2001	"She Walks This Earth (Soberana Rosa)"	Best Male Pop Vocal Performance	Won
2003	"Fragile (Live)"	Best Male Pop Vocal Performance	Nominated
2004	"Whenever I Say Your Name" (with Mary J. Blige)	Best Pop Collaboration with Vocals	Won
2004	"Send Your Love"	Best Male Pop Vocal Performance	Nominated
2005	"You Will Be My Ain True Love" (with Alison Krauss)	Best Song Written for a Motion Picture, Television or Other Visual Media	Nominated
2007	"Always on Your Side" (feat. Sheryl Crow)	Best Pop Collaboration with Vocals	Nominated
2019	44/876 (with Shaggy)	Best Reggae Album	Won

== Hungarian Music Awards ==
Year	Nominee / work	Award	Result
1995	Fields of Gold: The Best of Sting 1984–1994	Best Foreign Album	Won
2001	Brand New Day	Best Foreign Album	Nominated
2002	All This Time	Best Foreign Album	Nominated
2004	Sacred Love	Best Foreign Album	Nominated
2012	Symphonicities	Pop-Rock Album of the Year	Nominated
2014	The Last Ship	Pop-Rock Album of the Year	Nominated
2017	57th & 9th	Pop-Rock Album of the Year	Nominated

== Ivor Novello Awards ==
Year	Nominee / work	Award	Result
1982	Every Little Thing She Does Is Magic	The Best Pop Song	Won
1982	Every Little Thing She Does Is Magic	International Hit of the Year	Nominated
1984	Every Breath You Take	The Best Rock Song	Nominated
1984	Every Breath You Take	International Hit of the Year	Nominated
1984	Every Breath You Take	The Best Song Musically And Lyrically	Won
1984	Every Breath You Take	Most Performed Work	Won
1986	Money For Nothing	Best Contemporary Song	Nominated
1989	They Dance Alone	The Best Song Musically And Lyrically	Won
1994	If I Ever Lose My Faith in You	The Best Song Musically And Lyrically	Won
1998	I'll Be Missing You	Most Performed Work	Won
1998	I'll Be Missing You	International Hit of the Year	Nominated
1998	I'll Be Missing You	Best Selling UK Single	Nominated
2002	Himself	International Achievement	Won

== Kennedy Center Honors ==
Year	Nominated work	Category	Result
2014	Himself	Lifetime Contribution	Won

== Las Vegas Film Critics Society Awards ==
Year	Nominee / work	Award	Result
1998	The Mighty	Best Original Song	Nominated
2000	My Funny Friend and Me	Best Original Song	Nominated

== Latin Grammy Awards ==
Year	Nominee / work	Award	Result
2026	Hasta Jesús Tuvo Un Mal Día (CA7RIEL & Paco Amoroso featuring Sting)	Song of the Year	Nominated
2026	Hasta Jesús Tuvo Un Mal Día (CA7RIEL & Paco Amoroso featuring Sting)	Best Pop/Rock Song	Won

== MTV Movie Awards ==
Year	Nominee / work	Award	Result
1993	It's Probably Me	Best Song From a Movie	Nominated
1994	All For Love	Best Song From a Movie	Nominated

== MTV Video Music Awards ==
Year	Nominee / work	Award	Result
1984	"Every Breath You Take"	Video of the Year	Nominated
1984	"Every Breath You Take"	Best Overall Performance in a Video	Nominated
1984	"Every Breath You Take"	Best Group Video	Nominated
1984	"Every Breath You Take"	Best Direction	Nominated
1984	"Every Breath You Take"	Viewer's Choice	Nominated
1984	"Every Breath You Take"	Best Art Direction	Nominated
1984	"Every Breath You Take"	Best Cinematography in a Video	Won
1986	"If You Love Somebody Set Them Free"	Best Male Video	Nominated
1986	"If You Love Somebody Set Them Free"	Best Overall Performance in a Video	Nominated
1988	"We'll Be Together"	Best Choreography in a Video	Nominated
1988	"We'll Be Together"	Best Cinematography in a Video	Won
1993	"If I Ever Lose My Faith in You"	Best Male Video	Nominated
1993	"If I Ever Lose My Faith in You"	Best Art Direction in a Video	Nominated
1993	"If I Ever Lose My Faith in You"	Best Cinematography in a Video	Nominated

== MOJO Awards ==
Year	Nominee / work	Award	Result
2004	Himself	Mondial Award	Won

== Mercury Prize ==
Year	Nominee / work	Award	Result
1993	Ten Summoner's Tales	Album of the Year	Nominated

== My VH1 Music Awards ==
Year	Nominee / work	Award	Result
2000	Himself	Legend in Action	Won

== NME Awards ==
Year	Nominee / work	Award	Result
1979	Himself	Best Male Singer	Won

== NRJ Music Awards ==
Year	Nominee / work	Award	Result
2015	Himself	NRJ Award of Honor	Won

== Orville H. Gibson Guitar Awards ==
Year	Nominee / work	Award	Result
2000	Himself	Best Bassist (Male)	Nominated
2001	Himself	Best Bassist (Male)	Nominated

== Polar Music Prize ==
Year	Nominee / work	Award	Result
2017	Himself	Polar Music Prize	Won

== Pollstar Concert Industry Awards ==
Year	Nominee / work	Award	Result
2000	Tour	Small Hall Tour of the Year	Won
2005	Tour (w/Annie Lennox)	Major Tour of the Year	Won

== Primetime Emmy Awards ==
Year	Nominated work	Category	Result
2002	A&E In Concert: Sting in Tuscany...All This Time	Outstanding Individual Performance in a Variety or Music Program	Won

== Q Awards ==
Year	Nominee / work	Award	Result
1993	Ten Summoner's Tales	Best Album	Won

== Rock the Vote Patrick Lippert Awards ==
Year	Nominee / work	Award	Result
2000	Himself	Patrick Lippert Award	Won

== Satellite Awards ==
Year	Nominee / work	Award	Result
2001	My Funny Friend and Me	Best Original Song	Nominated

== Songwriters Hall of Fame ==
Year	Nominee / work	Award	Result
2002	Himself	Inducted	Won

== Tony Awards ==
Year	Nominee / work	Award	Result
2015	The Last Ship	Best Original Score	Nominated

== VH1/Vogue Fashion Awards ==
Year	Nominee / work	Award	Result
2000	Himself	Most Fashionable Artist (Male)	Nominated

== World Soundtrack Awards ==
Year	Nominee / work	Award	Result
2002	Until	Best Original Song	Nominated
2004	You Will Be My Ain True Love	Best Original Song	Nominated
