= Summer 2015 Tour =

2015 concert tour by Sting

- European tour by Sting
- Start date: 26 June 2015
- End date: 1 August 2015
- Legs: 1
- No. of shows: 19

Sting concert chronology
- On Stage Together Tour (2014–15); Summer 2015 Tour (2015); Rock Paper Scissors North American Tour (2016)

The Summer 2015 Tour was a solo concert tour of Europe by English musician Sting, his first one as a solo artist since the Back to Bass Tour in 2011–13.

== Tour dates ==
Date	City	Country	Venue
Europe
26 June 2015	Bergen	Norway	Bergen Calling Festival
27 Jun 2015	Stavangar	Norway	DNB Arena
28 Jun 2015	Kristiansand	Norway	Oddereya
30 Jun 2015	Aalborg	Denmark	Skovdalen
3 July 2015	Nantes	France	Les Nuits de l'Erdre
4 July 2015	Caen	France	Beauregard Festival
5 July 2015	Belfort	France	Les Eurockéennes de Belfort
7 July 2015	Monchengladbach	Germany	Warsteiner HockeyPark
12 July 2015	Cordoba	Spain	Festival de la Guitarra
14 July 2015	La Coruna	Spain	Coliseo
16 July 2015	Lisbon	Portugal	Super Bock Super Rock Festival
18 July 2015	Saint-Julien-en-Genevois	France	Guitare en Scène Festival
20 July 2015	Nîmes	France	Les Arènes
21 July 2015	Barolo	Italy	Festival Collisioni
24 July 2015	Pistoia	Italy	Pistoia Blues Festival
26 July 2015	Carcassonne	France	Festival de Carcassonne
29 July 2015	Helsingborg	Sweden	Sofiero
31 July 2015	Ostersund	Sweden	Storsjoyran
1 August 2015	Trondheim	Norway	Olavsfestdagene
