= Symphonicity Tour =

2010–11 concert tour by Sting

- Tour by Sting
- Location: North America; Europe; Australia; Asia
- Associated album: Symphonicities
- Start date: May 26, 2010
- End date: July 31, 2011
- No. of shows: 133

Sting concert chronology
- Symphonicity Tour (2010–11); Back to Bass Tour (2011–13)

The Symphonicity Tour was a worldwide concert tour by musician Sting in support of his album Symphonicities, which was released in 2010. He was accompanied by the Royal Philharmonic Orchestra. The concerts themselves featured material from the album as well as several hits from his solo career and The Police.

== Tour dates ==
Date	City	Country	Venue
Europe
26 May 2010	Wolfsburg	Germany	Kraftwerk
27 May 2010	Wolfsburg	Germany	Kraftwerk
Africa
29 May 2010^{[I]}	Rabat	Morocco	Mawazine Festival
North America
2 June 2010	Vancouver	Canada	The Centre in Vancouver for Performing Arts
4 June 2010	Portland	United States	Arlene Schnitzer Concert Hall
5 June 2010	Portland	United States	Arlene Schnitzer Concert Hall
6 June 2010	Auburn	United States	White River Amphitheatre
9 June 2010	Morrison	United States	Red Rocks Amphitheatre
10 June 2010	Morrison	United States	Red Rocks Amphitheatre
12 June 2010	Concord	United States	Sleep Train Pavilion
13 June 2010	Chula Vista	United States	Cricket Wireless Amphitheatre
15 June 2010	Los Angeles	United States	Hollywood Bowl
16 June 2010	Irvine	United States	Verizon Wireless Amphitheatre
18 June 2010	Las Vegas	United States	MGM Grand Garden Arena
21 June 2010	Saint Paul	United States	Xcel Energy Center
23 June 2010	Maryland Heights	United States	Verizon Wireless Amphitheatre
25 June 2010	The Woodlands	United States	Cynthia Woods Mitchell Pavilion
26 June 2010	New Orleans	United States	UNO Lakefront Arena
28 June 2010	Atlanta	United States	Chastain Park Amphitheatre
29 June 2010	Atlanta	United States	Chastain Park Amphitheatre
2 July 2010	West Palm Beach	United States	Cruzan Amphitheatre
3 July 2010	Tampa	United States	1-800-ASK-GARY Amphitheatre
6 July 2010	Uncasville	United States	Mohegan Sun Arena
7 July 2010	Holmdel	United States	PNC Bank Arts Center
9 July 2010	Atlantic City	United States	Borgata Event Center
10 July 2010	Camden	United States	Susquehanna Bank Center
11 July 2010	Bristow	United States	Jiffy Lube Live
13 July 2010	New York City	United States	Metropolitan Opera House
14 July 2010	New York City	United States	Metropolitan Opera House
16 July 2010	Clarkston	United States	DTE Energy Music Theatre
17 July 2010^{[A]}	Highland Park	United States	Ravinia Pavilion
18 July 2010	Highland Park	United States	Ravinia Pavilion
20 July 2010	Cincinnati	United States	Riverbend Music Center
21 July 2010	London	Canada	John Labatt Centre
22 July 2010	London	Canada	John Labatt Centre
23 July 2010	Toronto	Canada	Molson Amphitheatre
24 July 2010	Montreal	Canada	Bell Centre
25 July 2010	Ottawa	Canada	Scotiabank Place
27 July 2010	Wantagh	United States	Nikon at Jones Beach Theater
29 July 2010	Mansfield	United States	Comcast Center
30 July 2010	Bethel	United States	Bethel Woods Center for the Arts
31 July 2010	Saratoga Springs	United States	Saratoga Performing Arts Center
Europe
3 September 2010	Oslo	Norway	Oslo Konserthus
5 September 2010	Copenhagen	Denmark	Royal Danish Theatre
6 September 2010	Copenhagen	Denmark	Royal Danish Theatre
8 September 2010	Stockholm	Sweden	Ericsson Globe
10 September 2010	Helsinki	Finland	Hartwall Arena
11 September 2010	Tallinn	Estonia	Saku Suurhall
13 September 2010	Saint Petersburg	Russia	Ice Palace
15 September 2010	Moscow	Russia	Crocus City Hall
17 September 2010	Vilnius	Lithuania	Siemens Arena
18 September 2010	Minsk	Belarus	Minsk-Arena
20 September 2010	Poznań	Poland	Stadion Miejski
21 September 2010	Berlin	Germany	O_{2} World Berlin
22 September 2010	Prague	Czech Republic	O_{2} Arena
24 September 2010	Cologne	Germany	Lanxess Arena
26 September 2010	Geneva	Switzerland	SEG Geneva Arena
28 September 2010	Zürich	Switzerland	Hallenstadion
30 September 2010	Paris	France	Palais Omnisports de Paris-Bercy
1 October 2010	London	England	Royal Albert Hall
2 October 2010	London	England	Royal Albert Hall
4 October 2010	Manchester	England	O_{2} Apollo Manchester
5 October 2010	Gateshead	England	The Sage Gateshead
7 October 2010	Dublin	Ireland	The O_{2}
9 October 2010	Edinburgh	Scotland	Edinburgh Playhouse
11 October 2010	Nantes	France	Zénith Nantes Métropole
13 October 2010	Antwerp	Belgium	Sportpaleis
15 October 2010	Arnhem	Netherlands	GelreDome
16 October 2010	Arnhem	Netherlands	GelreDome
19 October 2010	Hamburg	Germany	O_{2} World Hamburg
20 October 2010	Frankfurt	Germany	Festhalle Frankfurt
23 October 2010	Stuttgart	Germany	Hanns-Martin-Schleyer-Halle
25 October 2010	Florence	Italy	Teatro Verdi
27 October 2010	Bilbao	Spain	Bizkaia Arena
29 October 2010	Barcelona	Spain	Palau Sant Jordi
30 October 2010	Madrid	Spain	Palacio de Deportes de la Comunidad
2 November 2010	Milan	Italy	Teatro Arcimboldi
3 November 2010	Turin	Italy	Torino Palasport Olimpico
5 November 2010	Vienna	Austria	Wiener Stadthalle
6 November 2010	Budapest	Hungary	Budapest Sports Arena
8 November 2010	Zagreb	Croatia	Arena Zagreb
10 November 2010	Rome	Italy	Sala Santa Cecilia
Asia
11 January 2011	Seoul	South Korea	Jamsil Arena
13 January 2011	Osaka	Japan	Chuo Gymnasium
14 January 2011	Nagoya	Japan	Aichi Gymnasium
17 January 2011	Tokyo	Japan	Nippon Budokan
18 January 2011	Tokyo	Japan	Nippon Budokan
19 January 2011	Tokyo	Japan	Nippon Budokan
Oceania
22 January 2011	Perth	Australia	Sandalford Estate, Swan Valley
26 January 2011	Adelaide	Australia	Barossa Arts & Convention Centre
28 January 2011	Melbourne	Australia	Sidney Myer Music Bowl
31 January 2011	Sydney	Australia	Sydney Opera House
1 February 2011	Sydney	Australia	Sydney Opera House
3 February 2011	Sydney	Australia	Sydney Opera House
4 February 2011	Sydney	Australia	Sydney Opera House
5 February 2011	Hunter Valley	Australia	Hope Estate Winery
7 February 2011	Brisbane	Australia	Riverstage
10 February 2011	Christchurch	New Zealand	CBS Canterbury Arena
12 February 2011	Napier	New Zealand	Mission Estate Winery
South America
23 February 2011	Lima	Peru	Estadio Monumental "U"
25 February 2011^{[B]}	Viña del Mar	Chile	Quinta Vergara Amphitheater
North America
28 April 2011	New York City	United States	Apollo Theater
Europe
6 June 2011	Bucharest	Romania	Piata Constitutiei
7 June 2011	Sofia	Bulgaria	Georgi Asparuhov Stadium
8 June 2011	Belgrade	Serbia	Belgrade Arena
10 June 2011	Ljubljana	Slovenia	Arena Stožice
11 June 2011	Graz	Austria	Schwarlz Freizeitzentrum
13 June 2011	Moscow	Russia	Olympic Stadium
16 June 2011	Saint Petersburg	Russia	Palace Square Saint Petersburg
18 June 2011	Gdańsk	Poland	Ergo Arena
20 June 2011	Aalborg	Denmark	Aalborghallen
22 June 2011	Mönchengladbach	Germany	Warsteiner HockeyPark
23 June 2011	Leipzig	Germany	Leipzig Arena
25 June 2011	Salem	Germany	Schloss Salem
27 June 2011	Vilnius	Lithuania	Vingis Park
29 June 2011	Bratislava	Slovakia	Zimny Stadion Ondreja Nepelu
30 June 2011	Budapest	Hungary	Budapest Sports Arena
2 July 2011	Kazan	Russia	TatNeft Arena
7 July 2011	Kyiv	Ukraine	Palace of Sports
9 July 2011^{[C]}	Locarno	Switzerland	Piazza Grande Locarno
11 July 2011^{[D]}	Montreux	Switzerland	Auditorium Stravinski
13 July 2011	Las Palmas	Spain	Estadio de Gran Canaria
15 July 2011	Granada	Spain	Plaza de Toros de Granada
18 July 2011	Mannheim	Germany	SAP Arena
19 July 2011	Munich	Germany	Olympiahalle
21 July 2011^{[E]}	Lyon	France	Ancient Theatre of Fourvière
22 July 2011^{[F]}	Saint-Malô-du-Bois	France	Le Théâtre de Verdure
23 July 2011^{[G]}	Nîmes	France	Arena of Nîmes
25 July 2011^{[H]}	Monte Carlo	Monaco	Sporting Monte-Carlo
27 July 2011	Palermo	Italy	Complesso Monumentale Castello a Mare
29 July 2011	Venice	Italy	Piazza San Marco
30 July 2011	Rome	Italy	Parco della Musica
31 July 2011	Brescia	Italy	Piazza Della Loggia

Festivals and other miscellaneous performances
^{A} This concert was a part of "Ravinia Festival"
^{B} This concert was a part of "2011 Viña del Mar International Song Festival"
^{C} This concert was a part of "Moon & Stars Festival"
^{D} This concert was a part of "Montreux Jazz Festival"
^{E} This concert was a part of "Les Nuits de Fourvière"
^{F} This concert was a part of "Festival de Poupet"
^{G} This concert was a part of "Festival de Nîmes"
^{H} This concert was a part of "Monte Carlo Sporting Club Summer Festival"
^{I} This concert was a part of "Mawazine Festival"
