= On Stage Together Tour =

2014–15 concert tour by Sting and Paul Simon

- Tour by Sting and Paul Simon
- Promotional poster for the tour
- Start date: 8 February 2014
- End date: 18 April 2015
- Legs: 3
- No. of shows: 52
Sting tour chronology
Back to Bass Tour (2011–13)	On Stage Together Tour (2014–15)	Summer 2015 Tour (2015)

The On Stage Together Tour was a concert tour by English musician Sting and American musician Paul Simon. The tour began on 8 February 2014 in Houston, Texas and traveled across North America, Oceania, and Europe before concluding on 18 April 2015 in Amsterdam, Netherlands.

== Background ==
Sting and Paul Simon became friends in the late 1980s when they both lived in the same apartment building on the Upper West Side of Manhattan in New York City. In May 2013, they performed together for the first time at the annual Robin Hood Foundation benefit. "We were booked separately and then we said, 'Let's do it together.' So we did 'The Boxer' and 'Fields of Gold,' and there was an audible gasp in the room when we walked on together, and when we started singing we obeyed the basic rules of harmony, and it was great," said Sting in an interview with Billboard magazine. An idea for a joint concert tour originated after that performance. "After we finished it, we both looked at each other and said: 'Wow. That's pretty interesting,'" recalled Simon.

Separately from the ongoing Australian leg of the tour, Sting performed with Australian singer, musician and his long-time backing vocalist Jo Lawry on 5 February 2015 at the Bennetts Lane Jazz Club, Melbourne, singing as a duet the song "Impossible" from Lawry's new album Taking Pictures.

== Set list ==
This set list is representative of the show on 8 February 2014. It does not represent all concerts for the duration of the tour.

1. "Brand New Day"
2. "The Boy in the Bubble"
3. "Fields of Gold"
4. "Every Little Thing She Does Is Magic"
5. "Englishman in New York"
6. "I Hung My Head"
7. "Driven to Tears"
8. "Love Is the Seventh Wave"
9. "Mother and Child Reunion"
10. "Crazy Love"
11. "Dazzling Blue"
12. "50 Ways to Leave Your Lover"
13. "Me and Julio Down by the Schoolyard"
14. "That Was Your Mother"
15. "Fragile"
16. "America"
17. "Message in a Bottle"
18. "The Hounds of Winter"
19. "They Dance Alone"
20. "Roxanne"
21. "Desert Rose"
22. "The Boxer"
23. "The Obvious Child"
24. "Hearts and Bones" / "Mystery Train" / "Wheels"
25. "Kodachrome" / "Gone At Last"
26. "Diamonds on the Soles of Her Shoes"
27. "You Can Call Me Al"
28. "Every Breath You Take"
29. "Late in the Evening"
30. "Bridge Over Troubled Water"

== Tour dates ==
List of concerts, showing date, city, country, venue, tickets sold, number of available tickets and amount of gross revenue
Date	City	Country	Venue	Attendance	Revenue
North America
8 February 2014	Houston	United States	Toyota Center	10,107 / 10,107	$1,220,770
9 February 2014	Dallas	United States	American Airlines Center	9,007 / 10,226	$1,578,075
11 February 2014	Denver	United States	Pepsi Center	9,218 / 10,190	$1,080,870
15 February 2014	Inglewood	United States	The Forum	12,898 / 12,898	$1,911,340
16 February 2014	Anaheim	United States	Honda Center	7,191 / 7,191	$878,645
17 February 2014	San Jose	United States	SAP Center	11,759 / 11,759	$1,422,435
19 February 2014	Seattle	United States	KeyArena	9,334 / 10,523	$1,553,815
20 February 2014	Vancouver	Canada	Rogers Arena	11,785 / 11,785	$1,420,137
23 February 2014	Saint Paul	United States	Xcel Energy Center	7,342 / 10,544	$1,204,085
25 February 2014	Chicago	United States	United Center	11,036 / 11,036	$1,558,245
26 February 2014	Auburn Hills	United States	The Palace of Auburn Hills	6,435 / 10,507	$1,638,114
28 February 2014	Montreal	Canada	Bell Centre	10,243 / 10,243	$1,168,771
1 March 2014	Toronto	Canada	Air Canada Centre	15,141 / 15,141	$1,792,850
3 March 2014	Boston	United States	TD Garden	12,066 / 12,066	$1,458,125
4 March 2014	New York City	United States	Madison Square Garden	27,410 / 27,410	$4,562,505
6 March 2014	New York City	United States	Madison Square Garden	27,410 / 27,410	$4,562,505
7 March 2014	Philadelphia	United States	Wells Fargo Center	11,481 / 11,481	$1,364,370
9 March 2014	Hershey	United States	Giant Center	8,310 / 10,100	$1,102,938
13 March 2014	Washington, D.C.	United States	Verizon Center	13,107 / 13,107	$1,755,885
15 March 2014	Sunrise	United States	BB&T Center	10,372 / 10,372	$1,349,485
16 March 2014	Orlando	United States	Amway Center	10,498 / 10,498	$1,175,900
Oceania
30 January 2015	Auckland	New Zealand	Vector Arena	—	—
31 January 2015	New Plymouth	New Zealand	TSB Bowl of Brooklands	—	—
3 February 2015	Brisbane	Australia	Brisbane Entertainment Centre	5,371 / 5,371	$726,493
7 February 2015	Geelong	Australia	Mount Duneed Estate	14,603 / 18,000	$2,245,270
8 February 2015	Adelaide	Australia	Coopers Brewery	—	—
10 February 2015	Melbourne	Australia	Rod Laver Arena	8,294 / 8,294	$988,851
13 February 2015	Sydney	Australia	Qantas Credit Union Arena	7,114 / 7,114	$1,035,330
14 February 2015	Hunter Valley	Australia	Hope Estate Winery	—	—
21 February 2015	Perth	Australia	Sir James Mitchell Park	21,390 / 25,000	$3,273,090
22 February 2015	Perth	Australia	Sir James Mitchell Park	21,390 / 25,000	$3,273,090
Europe
16 March 2015	Berlin	Germany	O2 World	12,541 / 12,887	$1,449,610
17 March 2015	Odense	Denmark	Sparekassen Fyn Arena	—	—
19 March 2015	Oslo	Norway	Oslo Spektrum	—	—
20 March 2015	Stockholm	Sweden	Ericsson Globe	—	—
22 March 2015	Amsterdam	Netherlands	Ziggo Dome	—	—
23 March 2015	Antwerp	Belgium	Sportpaleis	12,290 / 17,859	$2,066,930
25 March 2015	Cologne	Germany	Lanxess Arena	—	—
27 March 2015	Zürich	Switzerland	Hallenstadion	9,127 / 10,500	$1,530,810
28 March 2015	Munich	Germany	Olympiahalle	—	—
30 March 2015	Milan	Italy	Mediolanum Forum	—	—
1 April 2015	Vienna	Austria	Wiener Stadthalle	—	—
3 April 2015	Paris	France	Zénith de Paris	—	—
4 April 2015	Paris	France	Zénith de Paris	—	—
7 April 2015	Dublin	Ireland	3Arena	—	—
9 April 2015	Belfast	Northern Ireland	Odyssey Arena	—	—
10 April 2015	Glasgow	Scotland	SSE Hydro	7,887 / 7,887	$897,287
12 April 2015	Birmingham	England	LG Arena	—	—
13 April 2015	Manchester	England	Manchester Arena	8,691 / 8,691	$1,014,580
15 April 2015	London	England	The O_{2} Arena	23,401 / 25,684	$3,303,830
16 April 2015	London	England	The O_{2} Arena	23,401 / 25,684	$3,303,830
18 April 2015	Amsterdam	Netherlands	Ziggo Dome	—	—
Total				311,569 / 333,584	$49,729,441
