= Sting (musician) =

English musician and songwriter (born 1951)

Sting CBE
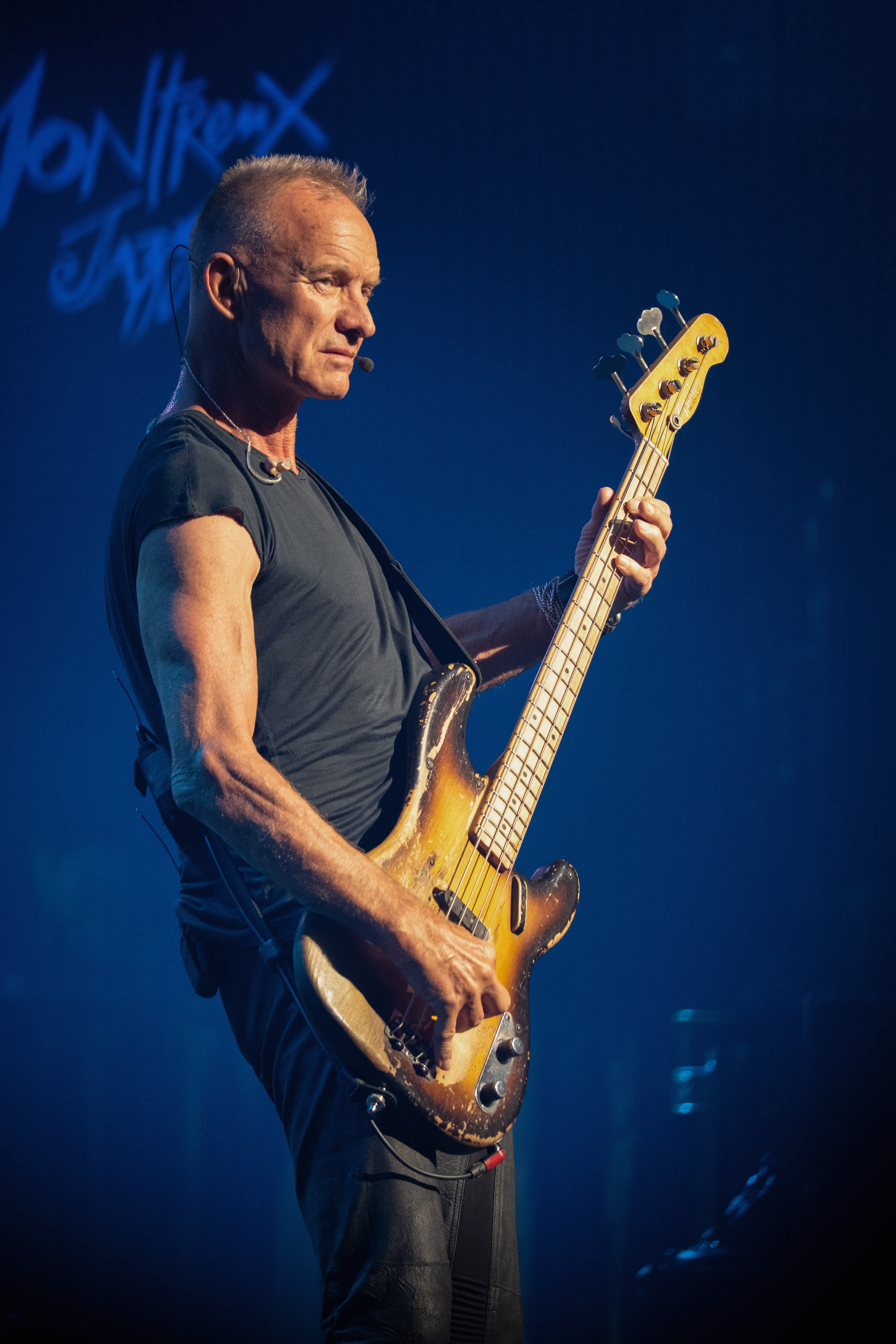
- Sting performing at the 2026 Montreux Jazz Festival
- Born: Gordon Matthew Thomas Sumner; 2 October 1951 (age 75); Wallsend, Northumberland, England
- Education: Northern Counties College of Education
- Occupations: Musician; singer; songwriter; activist; actor
- Years active: 1969–present
- Spouses: Frances Tomelty (m. 1976; div. 1984) Trudie Styler (m. 1992)
- Children: 6, including Joe, Mickey and Eliot
- Awards: Full list
- Musical career
- Genres: Pop; rock; new wave; post-punk; reggae; jazz
- Instruments: Vocals; bass guitar; guitar; double bass; keyboards; saxophone; lute
- Labels: A&M; Deutsche Grammophon; Cherrytree; Interscope; Polydor; Parlophone; Capitol
- Formerly of: Last Exit; the Police; Strontium 90
- Website: sting.com

Gordon Matthew Thomas Sumner (born 2 October 1951), known as Sting, is an English musician, songwriter, actor and activist. He was the lead vocalist, principal songwriter and bassist for the rock band the Police (1977–1984, 2007–2008). He began a solo career in 1985, after leaving the Police, and has included elements of rock, jazz, reggae, classical, new-age, and worldbeat in his music.

Sting has sold a combined total of more than 100 million records as a solo artist and as a member of the Police. He has received three Brit Awards, including Best British Male Artist in 1994 and Outstanding Contribution to Music in 2002; a Golden Globe; an Emmy; and four Academy Award nominations. As a solo musician and as a member of the Police, Sting has received 17 Grammy Awards. He was inducted into the Rock and Roll Hall of Fame as a member of the Police in 2003. Sting has received a star on the Hollywood Walk of Fame; the Ivor Novello Award for Lifetime Achievement from the British Academy of Songwriters, Composers and Authors; a CBE from Queen Elizabeth II for services to music; Kennedy Center Honors; and the Polar Music Prize. In May 2023, he was made an Ivor Novello Fellow.

== Early life and education ==
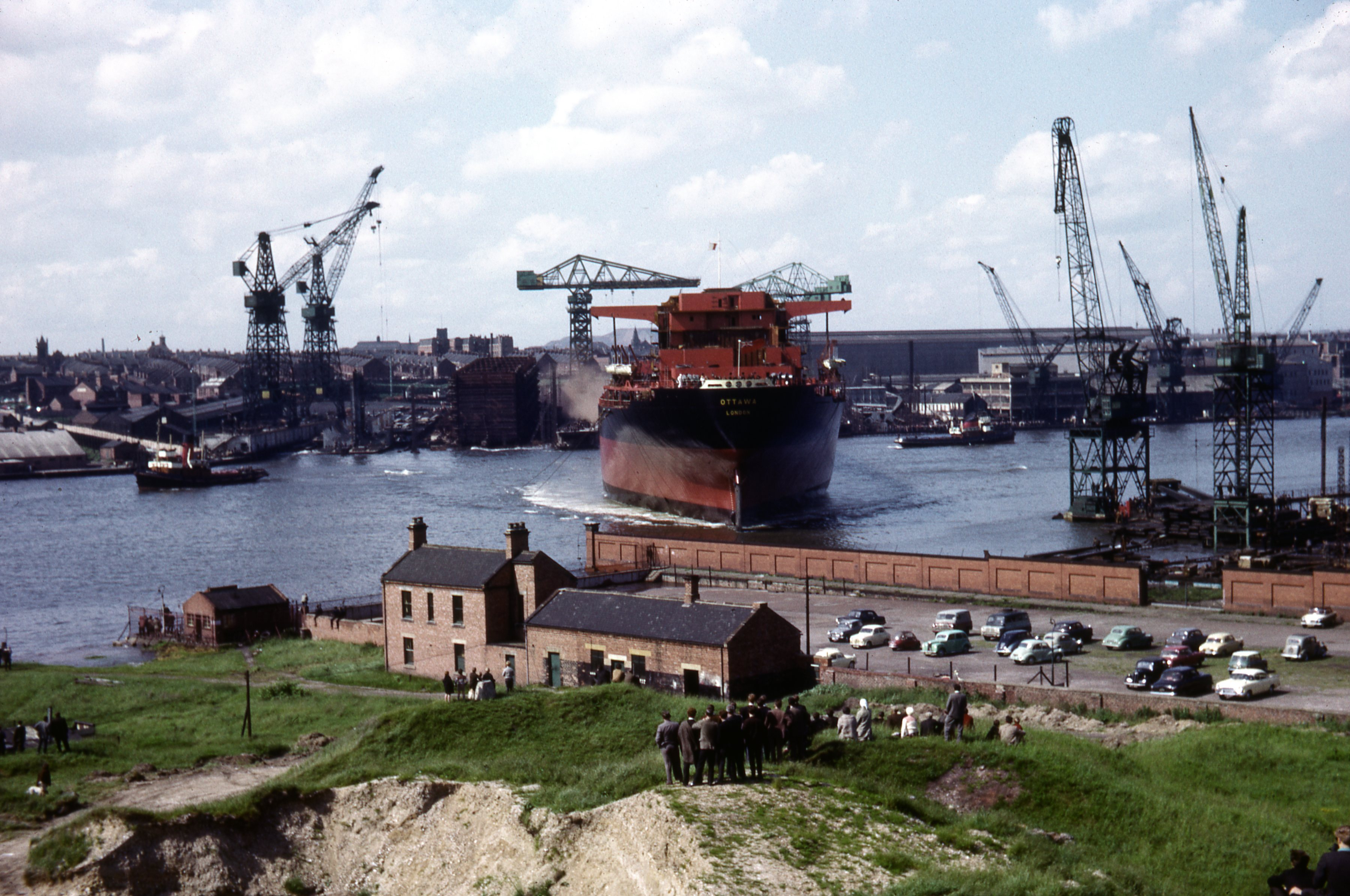
Wallsend shipyard on the River Tyne in 1964, near where Sting grew up. His childhood experiences and the local shipbuilding industry were the inspiration for his 2014 musical The Last Ship, which is also set in Wallsend.

Gordon Matthew Thomas Sumner was born at Sir G B Hunter Memorial Hospital in Wallsend, Northumberland, England, on 2 October 1951, the eldest of four children of Audrey (née Cowell), a hairdresser, and Ernest Matthew Sumner, a milkman and former fitter at an engineering works. He grew up near Wallsend's shipyards, which made an impression on him. As a child, he was inspired to leave the shipyards and seek a more glamorous life by the Queen Mother waving at him from a Rolls-Royce. He helped his father deliver milk and by ten was "obsessed" with an old Spanish guitar left by an emigrating friend of his father.

Sumner attended St Cuthbert's Grammar School in Newcastle upon Tyne. He visited nightclubs such as Club A'Gogo to see Cream and Manfred Mann, who influenced his music. He learned to play bass by speeding the playing of records to 78 rpm so he "could hear the bass lines more clearly". After leaving school in 1969, he enrolled at the University of Warwick in Coventry, but left after a term. After working as a bus conductor, building labourer, and tax officer, he attended the Northern Counties College of Education (now Northumbria University) and qualified as a teacher in 1973. He taught at St Paul's First School in Cramlington for two years.

Sumner performed jazz in the evenings, at weekends, and during breaks from college and teaching, playing with the Phoenix Jazzmen, Newcastle Big Band and Last Exit. He gained his nickname "Sting" during his time with the Phoenix Jazzmen, when bandleader Gordon Solomon remarked that Sumner's habitual black-and-yellow striped jumper made him look like a wasp. In the 1985 documentary Bring On the Night a journalist called him Gordon, to which he replied, "My children call me Sting, my mother calls me Sting, who is this Gordon character?" In 2011, he told Time "I was never called Gordon. You could shout 'Gordon' in the street and I would just move out of your way". Despite this, he chose not to legally change his name to "Sting".

== Musical career ==
=== 1977–1984: The Police and early solo work ===
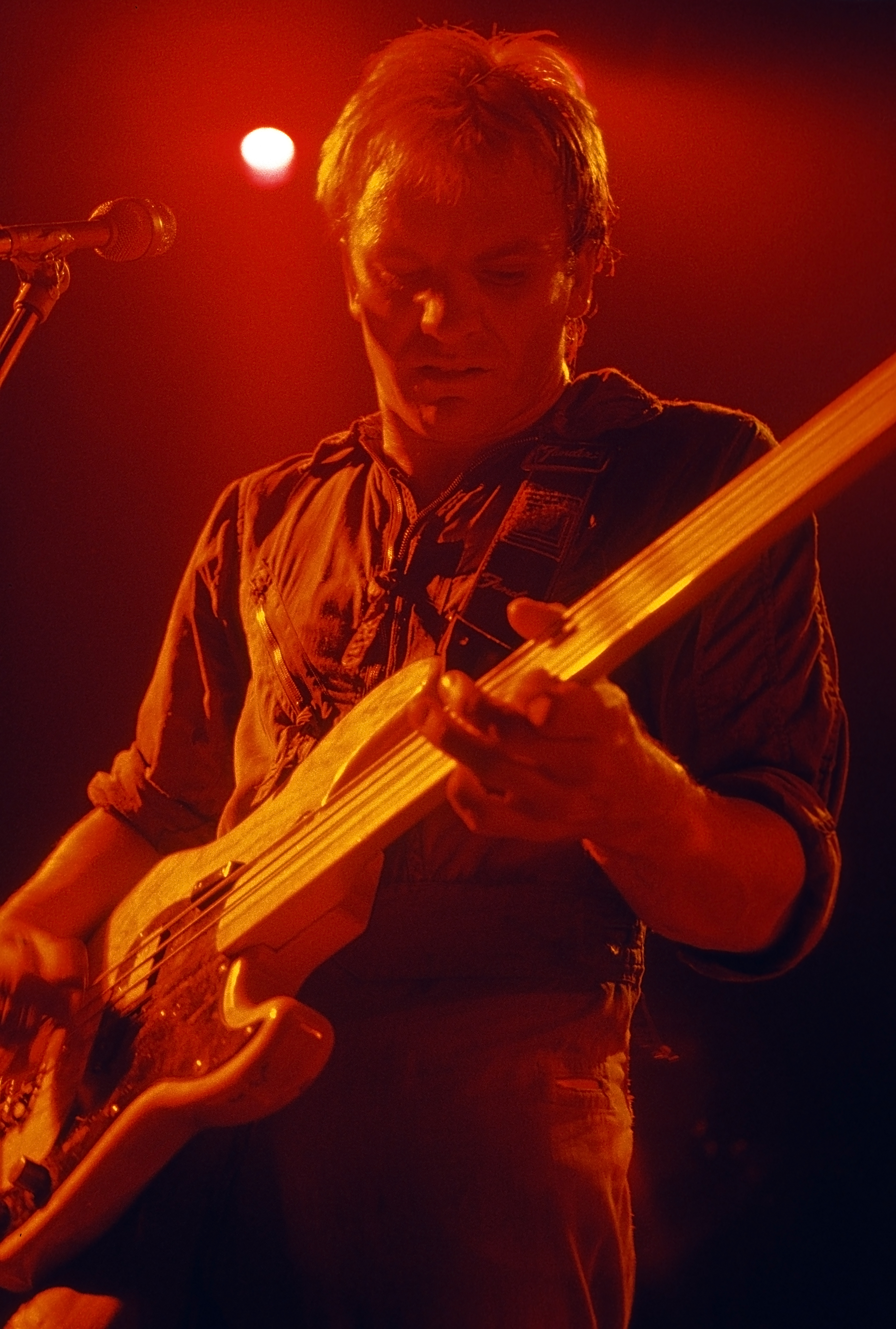
Sting in 1979

In January 1977, Sting joined Stewart Copeland and Henry Padovani (soon replaced by Andy Summers) to form the Police, becoming the band's lead singer, bass player, and primary songwriter. From 1978 to 1983, the Police had five UK chart-topping albums, won six Grammy Awards and won two Brit Awards (for Best British Group and for Outstanding Contribution to Music). Their initial sound was punk-inspired, but they switched to reggae rock and minimalist pop. Their final album, Synchronicity, was nominated for five Grammy Awards including Album of the Year in 1983. It included their most successful song, "Every Breath You Take", written by Sting.

Even though logic would say, "Are you out of your mind? You're in the biggest band in the world – just bite the bullet and make some money." But there continued to be some instinct, against logic, against good advice, [that] told me I should quit.

— Sting on quitting the band in 1984.

According to Sting, appearing in the documentary Last Play at Shea, he decided to leave the Police while onstage during a concert of 18 August 1983 at Shea Stadium in New York City because he felt that playing that venue was "[Mount] Everest". While never formally breaking up, after Synchronicity, the group agreed to concentrate on solo projects. As the years went by, the band members, especially Sting, dismissed the possibility of reforming. In 2007, the band did reform temporarily for the purpose of undertaking a reunion tour.

Four of the band's five studio albums appeared on Rolling Stone's list of the 500 Greatest Albums of All Time and two of the band's songs, "Every Breath You Take" and "Roxanne", each written by Sting, appeared on Rolling Stone's 500 Greatest Songs of All Time. In addition, "Every Breath You Take" and "Roxanne" were among the Rock and Roll Hall of Fame's 500 Songs that Shaped Rock and Roll. In 2003, the band was inducted into the Rock and Roll Hall of Fame. They were also included in Rolling Stone and VH1's lists of the "100 Greatest Artists of All Time".

In 1978, Sting collaborated with members of Hawkwind and Gong as the Radio Actors on the one-off single "Nuclear Waste". In September 1981, Sting made his first live solo appearances, performing on all four nights of the fourth Amnesty International benefit The Secret Policeman's Other Ball in London's Theatre Royal, Drury Lane, at the invitation of producer Martin Lewis. He performed solo versions of "Roxanne" and "Message in a Bottle". He also led an all-star band (dubbed "the Secret Police") on his own arrangement of Bob Dylan's "I Shall Be Released". The band and chorus included Eric Clapton, Jeff Beck, Robin Gibb, Cliff Richard, Phil Collins, Bob Geldof and Midge Ure, all of whom (except Beck and Gibb) later performed at Live Aid. In 1982 he released a solo single, "Spread a Little Happiness" from the film of the Dennis Potter television play Brimstone and Treacle. The song was a reinterpretation of the 1920s musical Mr. Cinders by Vivian Ellis and a Top 20 hit in the UK.

=== 1985–1989: Solo debut ===
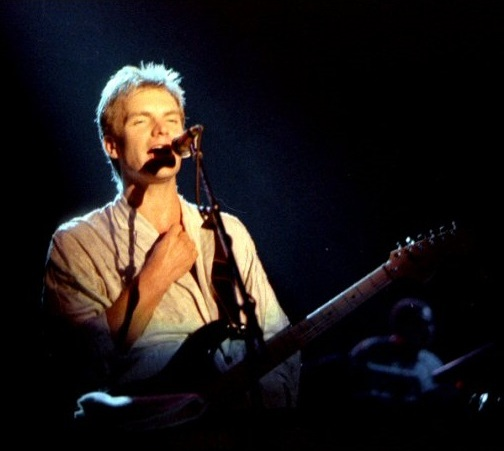
Sting performing in Norway in 1985

Sting's first solo album, 1985's The Dream of the Blue Turtles, featured jazz musicians including Kenny Kirkland, Darryl Jones, Omar Hakim and Branford Marsalis. It included the hit singles "If You Love Somebody Set Them Free" (backed with the non-LP song "Another Day"), "Fortress Around Your Heart", "Love Is the Seventh Wave" and "Russians", the latter of which was based on a theme from the Lieutenant Kijé Suite. Within a year, the album reached Triple Platinum. The album received Grammy nominations for Album of the Year, Best Male Pop Vocal Performance, Best Jazz Instrumental Performance and Best Engineered Recording.

In November 1984, Sting was part of Band Aid's "Do They Know It's Christmas?", which raised money for famine victims in Ethiopia. Released in June 1985, Sting sang the line "I Want My MTV" on "Money for Nothing" by Dire Straits. In July 1985, Sting performed Police hits at the Live Aid concert at Wembley Stadium in London. He also joined Dire Straits in "Money for Nothing" and he sang two duets with Phil Collins. In 1985, Sting provided spoken vocals for the Miles Davis album You're Under Arrest, taking the role of a French-speaking police officer. He also sang backing vocals on Arcadia's single "The Promise", on two songs from Phil Collins' album No Jacket Required, and contributed "Mack the Knife" to the Hal Willner-produced tribute album Lost in the Stars: The Music of Kurt Weill. In September 1985, he performed "If You Love Somebody Set Them Free" at the 1985 MTV Video Music Awards at the Radio City Music Hall in New York. The 1985 film Bring On the Night, directed by Michael Apted, documented the formation of his solo band and its first concert in France.

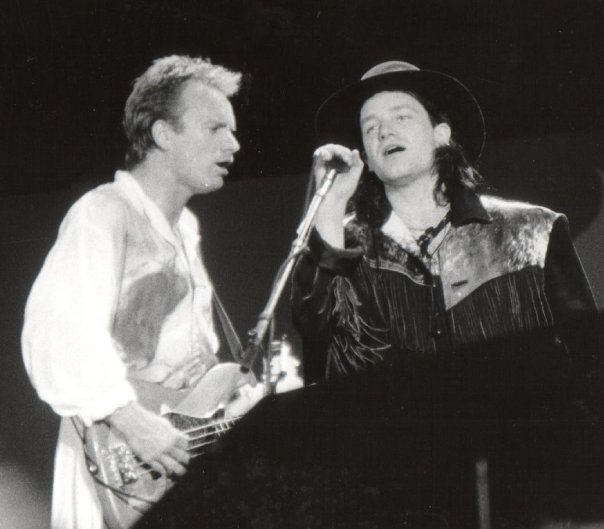
Sting and Bono at the Conspiracy of Hope concert in New Jersey, 1986

Sting released ...Nothing Like the Sun in 1987, including singles, "We'll Be Together", "Fragile", "Englishman in New York" and "Be Still My Beating Heart", dedicated to his mother, who had recently died. It went Double Platinum. "The Secret Marriage" from this album was adapted from Hanns Eisler and "Englishman in New York" was about Quentin Crisp. The album's title is from William Shakespeare's Sonnet 130. The album won Best British Album at the 1988 Brit Awards and in 1989 received three Grammy nominations including his second consecutive nomination for Album of the Year. "Be Still My Beating Heart" earned nominations for Song of the Year and Best Male Pop Vocal Performance. In 1989, ...Nothing Like the Sun was ranked number 90 and his Police album Synchronicity was ranked number 17 on Rolling Stone's 100 greatest albums of the 1980s.

In February 1988, he made Nada como el sol, four songs from Nothing like the Sun he sang in Spanish and Portuguese. In 1987, jazz arranger Gil Evans placed him in a big band setting for a live album of Sting's songs, and on Frank Zappa's 1988 Broadway the Hard Way he performed an arrangement of "Murder by Numbers", set to "Stolen Moments" by Oliver Nelson and dedicated to evangelist Jimmy Swaggart. In October 1988 he recorded a version of Igor Stravinsky's The Soldier's Tale with the London Sinfonietta conducted by Kent Nagano. It featured Vanessa Redgrave, Ian McKellen, Gianna Nannini and Sting as the soldier.

=== 1990–1997: Greater solo success ===
Sting's 1991 album, The Soul Cages, was dedicated to his late father. It included "All This Time" and the Grammy-winning title track. The album went Platinum. Also in 1991, he performed "Come Down in Time" for the tribute album Two Rooms: Celebrating the Songs of Elton John and Bernie Taupin.

In England, our house is surrounded by barley fields, and in the summer it's fascinating to watch the wind moving over the shimmering surface, like waves on an ocean of gold. There's something inherently sexy about the sight, something primal, as if the wind were making love to the barley. Lovers have made promises here, I'm sure, their bonds strengthened by the comforting cycle of the seasons.

— Sting on the "Fields of Gold" lyrics.

Sting's fourth album, Ten Summoner's Tales, peaked at two in the UK and US album charts in 1993 and went triple platinum in just over a year. The album was recorded at his Elizabethan country home, Lake House in Wiltshire. Ten Summoner's Tales was nominated for the Mercury Prize in 1993 and for the Grammy for Album of the Year in 1994. The title is a wordplay on his surname, Sumner and "The Summoner's Tale", one of The Canterbury Tales by Geoffrey Chaucer. Hit singles on the album include "Fields of Gold", a song inspired by the barley fields next to his Wiltshire home, with the music video featuring a silhouette of Sting walking through a village containing common features seen throughout the UK during that time such as a red telephone box and "If I Ever Lose My Faith in You", the latter earning his second award for best male pop singer at the 36th Grammy Awards.

Sting in Madrid 1991, during "The Soul Cages Tour"

In May 1993, he covered his own Police song from the Ghost in the Machine album, "Demolition Man", for the Demolition Man film. With Bryan Adams and Rod Stewart, Sting performed "All for Love" for the film The Three Musketeers. The song stayed at the top of the U.S. charts for three weeks, topped multiple other charts worldwide and reached number two in the UK. In February, he won two Grammy Awards and was nominated for three more. Berklee College of Music awarded him his second honorary doctorate of music in May. In November, he released the compilation, Fields of Gold: The Best of Sting, which was certified Double Platinum. That year, he sang with Vanessa Williams on "Sister Moon" and appeared on her album The Sweetest Days. At the 1994 Brit Awards in London, he was Best British Male.

Sting's 1996 album, Mercury Falling, debuted strongly, with the single "Let Your Soul Be Your Pilot" reaching number 15 in the UK Singles Chart, but the album soon dropped from the charts. He reached the UK Top 40 with two further singles the same year with "You Still Touch Me" (number 27 in June) and "I Was Brought To My Senses" (number 31 in December). The song "I'm So Happy I Can't Stop Crying" from this album also became a US country music hit in 1997 in a version with Toby Keith. Sting recorded music for the Disney film Kingdom of the Sun, which was reworked into The Emperor's New Groove. The film's overhauls and plot changes were documented by Sting's wife, Trudie Styler, as the changes resulted in some songs not being used. Sting acquired ownership of his solo recordings and the Police's recordings when he re-signed with Capitol in 1997.

On 4 September 1997, Sting performed "I'll Be Missing You" with Puff Daddy at the 1997 MTV Video Music Awards in tribute to Notorious B.I.G. On 15 September 1997, Sting appeared at the Music for Montserrat concert at the Royal Albert Hall, London, performing with fellow British artists Paul McCartney, Elton John, Eric Clapton, Phil Collins and Mark Knopfler.

=== 1998–2005: Brand New Day and soundtrack work ===
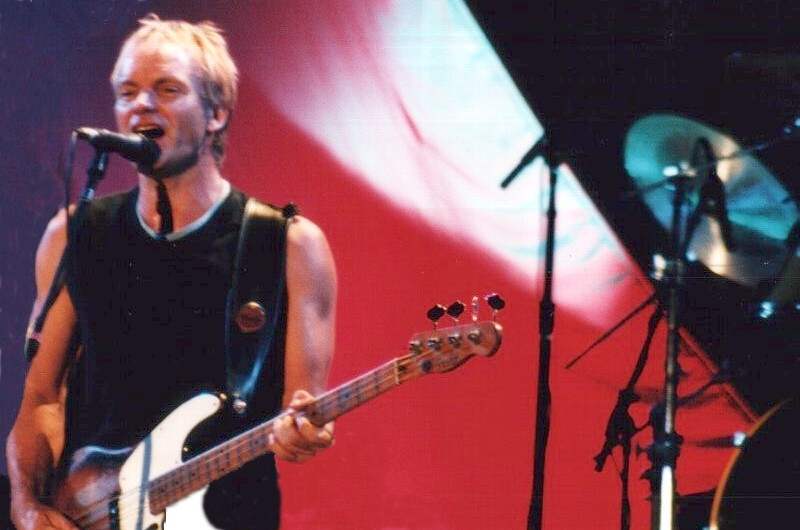
Sting on stage in Budapest in January 2000

After a period of relative musical inactivity beginning in 1997, Sting returned in September 1999 with his album Brand New Day. The album produced two UK Top 20 hits: the title track, featuring Stevie Wonder on harmonica, which peaked at number 13, and "Desert Rose", which reached number 15. By January 2001, the album had been certified triple platinum. In 2000, Sting won two Grammy Awards for the album and its title track. At the ceremony, he performed "Desert Rose" alongside Cheb Mami, also appeared on the album recording.

In 2000, the soundtrack for The Emperor's New Groove was released with complete songs from the previous version of the film. The final single used to promote the film, "My Funny Friend and Me", was Sting's first nomination for an Academy Award for Best Song.

In February 2001, he won another Grammy for "She Walks This Earth (Soberana Rosa)" on A Love Affair: The Music Of Ivan Lins. His "After the Rain Has Fallen" made it into the Top 40. His next project was a live album at his villa in Figline Valdarno, released as a CD and DVD as well as being broadcast on the internet. The CD and DVD were to be entitled On Such a Night and intended to feature re-workings of Sting favourites such as "Roxanne" and "If You Love Somebody Set Them Free". The concert, scheduled for 11 September 2001, was altered due to the terrorist attacks in America that day. The webcast shut after one song (a reworked version of "Fragile"), after which Sting let the audience decide whether to continue the show. They decided to go ahead and the album and DVD appeared in November as ...All This Time, dedicated "to all those who lost their lives on that day". He performed "Fragile" with Yo-Yo Ma and the Mormon Tabernacle Choir during the opening ceremonies of the 2002 Winter Olympics in Salt Lake City, Utah, US.

In 2002, he won a Golden Globe Award for "Until..." from the film Kate & Leopold. Written and performed by him, "Until..." was his second nomination for an Academy Award for Best Song. At the 2002 Brit Awards in February, Sting received the prize for Outstanding Contribution to Music. In May 2002 he received the Ivor Novello Award for Lifetime Achievement from the British Academy of Songwriters, Composers and Authors. In the Queen's Birthday Honours 2003, Sting was appointed a Commander of the Most Excellent Order of the British Empire (CBE) for services to the Music Industry. At the 54th Primetime Emmy Awards in September, Sting won an Emmy Award for Outstanding Individual Performance in a Variety Or Music Program, for his A&E special, Sting in Tuscany... All This Time.

In 2003, Sting released Sacred Love, a studio album featuring collaborations with hip-hop artist Mary J. Blige and sitar performer Anoushka Shankar. He and Blige won a Grammy for their duet, "Whenever I Say Your Name". The song is based on Johann Sebastian Bach's Praeambulum 1 C-Major (BWV 924) from the Klavierbuechlein fuer Wilhelm Friedemann Bach, though Sting said little about this adaptation. In 2004, he was nominated for the third time for an Academy Award for Best Song, for "You Will Be My Ain True Love", from Cold Mountain, sung in duet with Alison Krauss. The pair performed the song at the 76th Academy Awards.

His autobiography Broken Music was published in October. He embarked on a Sacred Love tour in 2004 with performances by Annie Lennox. Sting went on the Broken Music tour, touring smaller venues, with a four-piece band, starting in Los Angeles on 28 March 2005 and ending on 14 May 2005. Sting was on the 2005 Monkey Business CD by hip-hop group the Black Eyed Peas, singing on "Union", which samples his Englishman in New York. Continuing with Live Aid, he appeared at Live 8 at Hyde Park, London in July 2005.

=== 2006–2010: Experimental albums and the Police reunion ===
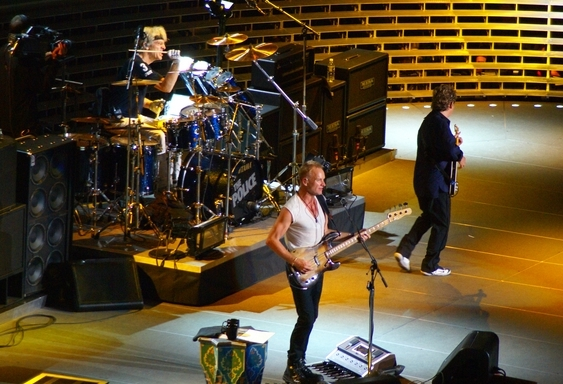
Sting with the Police at Madison Square Garden, New York, 1 August 2007

In 2006, Sting was on the Gregg Kofi Brown album, with "Lullaby to an Anxious Child" produced and arranged by Lino Nicolosi and Pino Nicolosi of Nicolosi Productions.

In October 2006, he released an album entitled Songs from the Labyrinth featuring the music of John Dowland (an Elizabethan-era composer) and accompaniment from Bosnian lute player Edin Karamazov. Sting's interpretation of this English Renaissance composer and his cooperation with Edin Karamazov brought recognition in classical music. As promotion of this album, he appeared on the fifth episode of Studio 60 to perform a segment of Dowland's "Come Again" as well as his own "Fields of Gold" in arrangement for voice and two archlutes.

On 11 February 2007, he reunited with the Police to open the 2007 Grammy Awards, singing "Roxanne", and announced a reunion tour, the first concert of which was in Vancouver on 28 May 2007 for 22,000 fans. The Police toured for more than a year, beginning with North America and crossing to Europe, South America, Australia, New Zealand and Japan. Tickets for the British tour sold out within 30 minutes, the band playing two nights at Twickenham Stadium, southwest London on 8 and 9 September 2007.

"Brand New Day" was the final song of the night for the Neighborhood Ball, one of ten inaugural balls honouring President Barack Obama on Inauguration Day, 20 January 2009. Sting was joined by Stevie Wonder on harmonica.

Sting entered the studio in early February 2009 to begin work on a new album, If on a Winter's Night..., released in October 2009. Initial reviews by fans that had access to early promotional copies were mixed, and some questioned Sting's artistic direction with this album. In 2009, Sting appeared at the Rock and Roll Hall of Fame 25th anniversary concert, playing "Higher Ground" and "Roxanne" with Stevie Wonder and "People Get Ready" with Jeff Beck. Sting himself was inducted in 2003, as a member of the Police.

In October 2009, Sting played a concert in Tashkent, Uzbekistan, for an arts and cultural festival organised by the Forum of Culture and Arts of Uzbekistan Foundation. Despite claiming he thought the concert was sponsored by UNICEF, he faced criticism in the press for receiving a payment of between one and two million pounds from Uzbek president Islam Karimov for the performance. Karimov is accused by the UN and Amnesty of human rights abuses and UNICEF stated they had no connection with the event.

Sting embarked on his Symphonicity Tour in 2010 and released an accompanying Symphonicities album the same year, which consisted of classical symphonic reinterpretations of his work.

=== 2010–2016: The Last Ship and joint tours with Paul Simon and Peter Gabriel ===
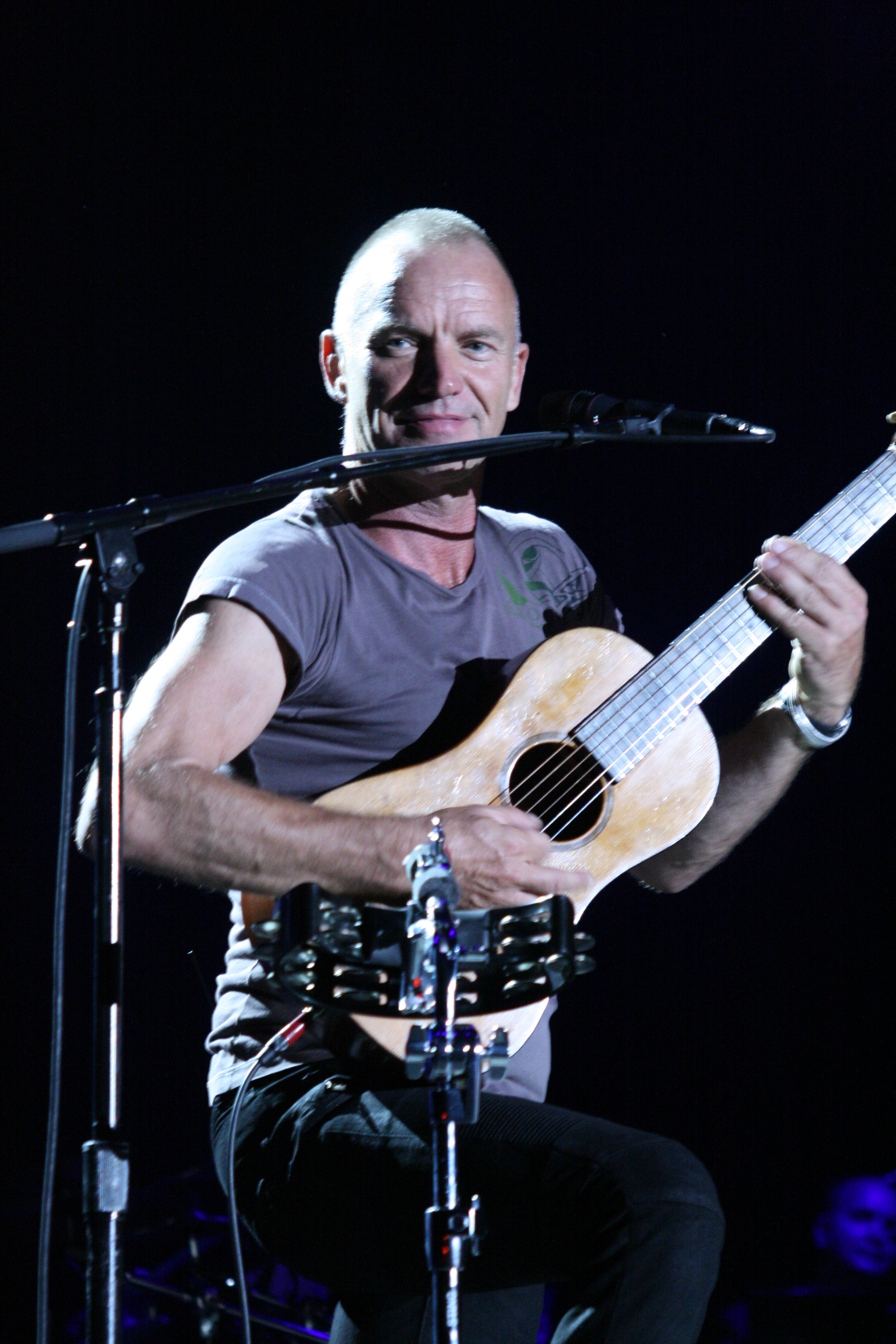
Sting performing in Budapest, 30 June 2011

In October 2010, Sting played two concerts in Arnhem, Netherlands, for Symphonica in Rosso and during 2010–2011, Sting continued his Symphonicity Tour, touring South Korea, Japan, Australia, New Zealand, South America and Europe. In the second half of 2011, Sting began his Back to Bass Tour, which would continue (with periodic breaks) through 2013. In 2011, Time magazine named Sting one of the 100 most influential people in the world. On 26 April he performed "Every Breath You Take", "Roxanne" and "Desert Rose" at the Time 100 Gala in New York City.

Sting recorded a song called "Power's Out" with Nicole Scherzinger. The song, originally recorded in 2007, was to have been included on Scherzinger's shelved album, Her Name is Nicole. The song was released on Scherzinger's 2011 debut album, Killer Love. Sting recorded a new version of the song "Let Your Soul Be Your Pilot" as a duet with Glee actor/singer Matthew Morrison, which appears on Morrison's 2011 eponymous debut album. On 15 September 2011, Sting performed "Fragile" at the 92nd Street Y in New York City, to honour the memory of his friend, financier-philanthropist Herman Sandler, who died in the 9/11 attacks on the World Trade Center.

For several years, Sting worked on a musical, The Last Ship, inspired by Sting's own childhood experiences and the shipbuilding industry in Wallsend. The Last Ship tells a story about the demise of the British shipbuilding industry in 1980s Newcastle and debuted in Chicago in June 2014 before transferring to Broadway in the autumn. Sting's eleventh studio album, titled The Last Ship, and inspired by the play, was released on 24 September 2013. The album features guest artists with roots in northeast England, including Brian Johnson, vocalist from AC/DC.

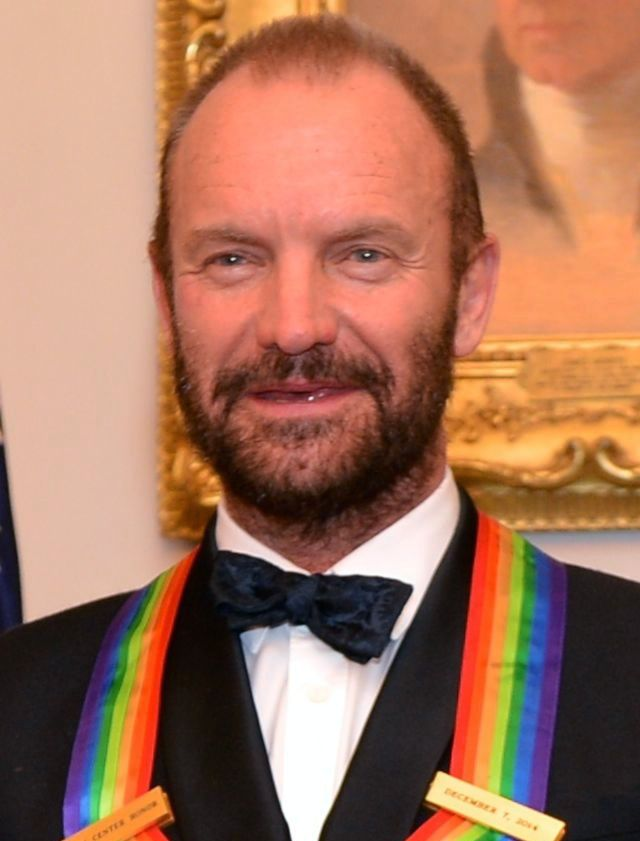
Sting with his 2014 Kennedy Center Honoree Medallion, on 6 December 2014

In February 2014, Sting embarked on a joint concert tour titled On Stage Together with Paul Simon, playing 21 concerts in North America. The tour continued in early 2015, with ten shows in Australia and New Zealand, and 23 concerts in Europe, ending on 18 April 2015. On 26 June 2015 in Bergen, Norway (at the Bergen Calling Festival), Sting embarked on a 21-date Summer 2015 solo tour of Europe in Trondheim, Norway (at the Olavsfestdagene), visiting Denmark, France, Germany, Spain, Portugal, Italy and Sweden.

On 6 December 2014, Sting received his Kennedy Center Honors medallion during the traditional State Department dinner in Washington, D.C., hosted by John Kerry. The following evening, he was honored at the 37th Kennedy Center Honors, hosted by Stephen Colbert and attended by then President Barack Obama. Introduced by Meryl Streep, the tribute featured performances of Sting's songs by Lady Gaga ("If I Ever Lose My Faith in You"), Esperanza Spalding and Herbie Hancock ("Fragile"), Bruce Springsteen ("I Hung My Head"), and Bruno Mars, who performed a medley of "So Lonely", "Roxanne" and "Message in a Bottle" alongside members of Sting's Broadway musical The Last Ship. The honor recognized Sting's lifetime contributions to music and the performing arts.

On 28 August 2015, "Stolen Car", a duet with French singer Mylène Farmer was released. It is a cover from Sting's 2003 seventh solo studio album, Sacred Love, and will serve as the first single from Farmer's tenth studio album, Interstellaires. On its release, the song went straight to number one over French iTunes music download charts, subsequently hitting number one on the main French singles chart and giving Sting his first number one in France. In 2016, Sting performed a 19-date joint concert summer tour of North America with Peter Gabriel.

=== 2016–2020: 57th and 9th, 44/876 and My Songs ===
The rock album 57th & 9th was released in November 2016. Sting remarked that it was "rockier than anything" he'd done in a while. The title is a reference to the New York City intersection he crossed every day to get to the studio where much of the album was recorded. It has contributions by long-time band members Vinnie Colaiuta and Dominic Miller, and Jerry Fuentes and Diego Navaira of the Last Bandoleros. The album was produced by Sting's manager, Martin Kierszenbaum. On 9 November 2016, Sting performed two shows at Irving Plaza, in Manhattan, New York City, playing songs from 57th & 9th for the first time live in concert: a "57th & 9th iHeartRadio Album Release Party" show and a Sting Fan Club Member Exclusive Show later that night. Named the 57th & 9th Tour, a world tour of theatres, clubs and arenas in support of 57th & 9th (with special guests Joe Sumner and the Last Bandoleros) began on 1 February 2017 in Vancouver at the Commodore Ballroom and continued into October.

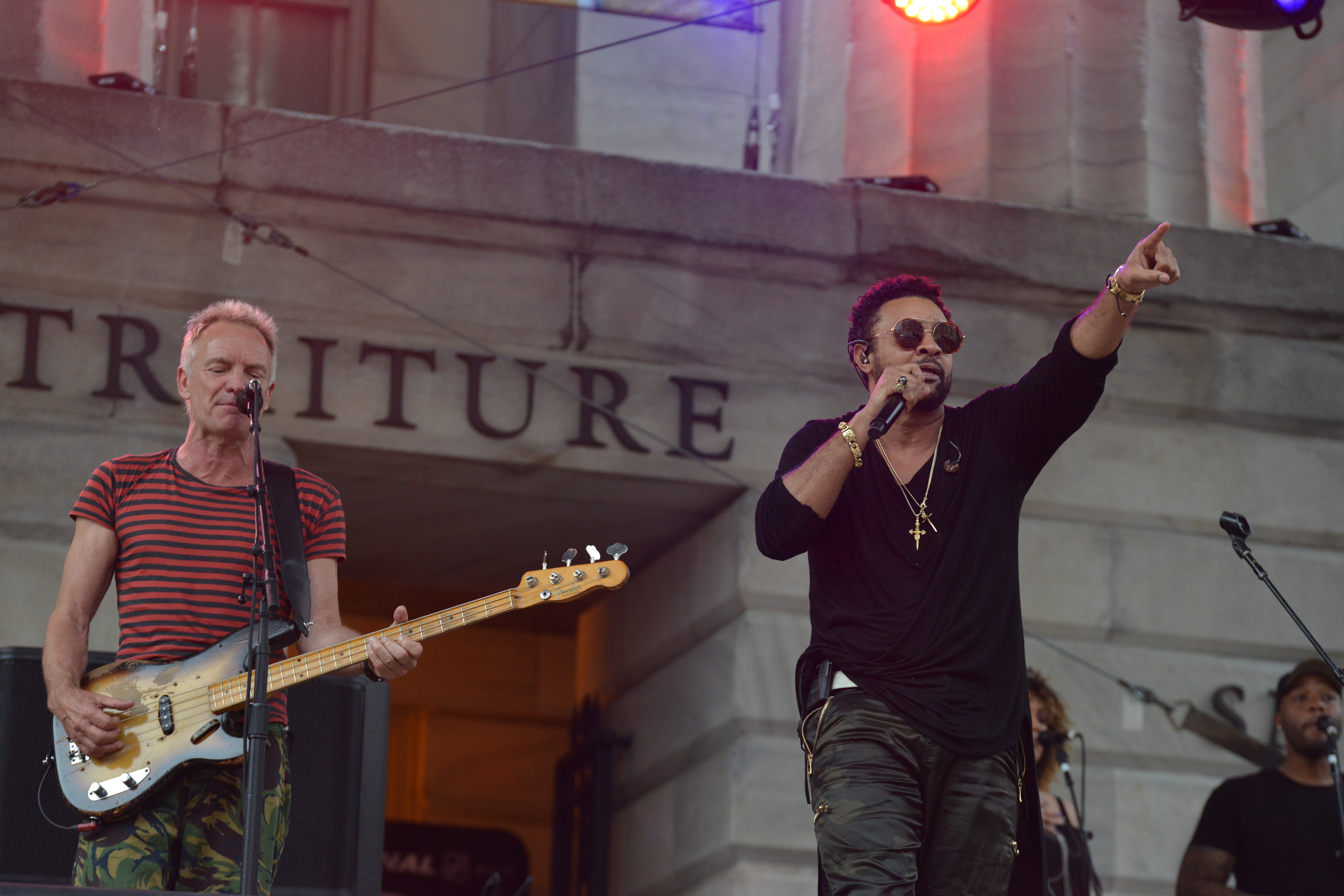
Sting (left) performing with Shaggy at the 2018 Capitals playoff concert

On 4 November 2016, management of the Bataclan theatre announced that Sting would perform an exclusive concert in Paris on 12 November 2016 for the re-opening of the Bataclan, a year after the terrorist attack at the venue. The Police's former guitar player, French native Henry Padovani, joined the band on stage for "Next to You", one of the encores. (Note: About the 2016 Bataclan re-opening show, Sting stated: "In re-opening the Bataclan, we have two important tasks to reconcile. First, to remember and honour those who lost their lives in the attack a year ago, and second to celebrate the life and the music that this historic theatre represents. In doing so we hope to respect the memory as well as the life affirming spirit of those who fell. We shall not forget them.")

Sting was announced as the joint winner of the 2017 Polar Music Prize, a Swedish international award given in recognition of excellence in the world of music. The award committee stated: "As a composer, Sting has combined classic pop with virtuoso musicianship and an openness to all genres and sounds from around the world." In 2018, he scheduled a musical and story-telling performance at the Metropolitan Museum of Art honouring Hudson River School artist Thomas Cole.

For the first time in 22 years, BMI has a new top song in our repertoire with Sting's timeless hit "Every Breath You Take", a remarkable achievement that solidifies its place in songwriting history.

— BMI President Mike O'Neill in May 2019 on "Every Breath You Take" becoming the most played song in US radio history.

On 7 February 2018, Sting performed as special guest at the Italian Sanremo Music Festival, singing "Muoio per te", the Italian version of "Mad About You", the lyrics of which were written by his friend and colleague Zucchero Fornaciari and "Don't Make Me Wait" with Shaggy. 44/876, Sting and Shaggy's first studio album as a duo, was released in April 2018. On 21 April 2018, Sting was among the artists to perform at the Queen's Birthday Party held at the Royal Albert Hall. In 2019, he received a BMI Award when "Every Breath You Take", a hit single by the Police, became the most-played song in radio history.

Sting's fourteenth album, titled My Songs, was released on 24 May 2019. The album features 14 studio (and one live) re-recorded versions of his songs released throughout his solo career and his time with the Police. In support of the album, a world tour named the My Songs Tour started on 28 May 2019 at La Seine Musicale in Paris and ended on 2 September 2019 at Kit Carson Park in Taos, New Mexico. A 16-date residency from 22 May to 2 September 2020 at Caesars Palace in Las Vegas, Nevada was rescheduled due to COVID-19, with the first date taking place on 29 October 2021. His six nights at the London Palladium were rescheduled to April 2022.

On 14 April 2020, Sting recorded a duet cover of "Message in a Bottle" with the girl group All Saints. The same year, he appeared on the song "Simple" available on the EP Pausa by Ricky Martin. Also in 2020, Sting was listed as number 32 on Rolling Stone's list of the top 50 greatest bassists of all time.

=== 2021–present: Duets and The Bridge ===
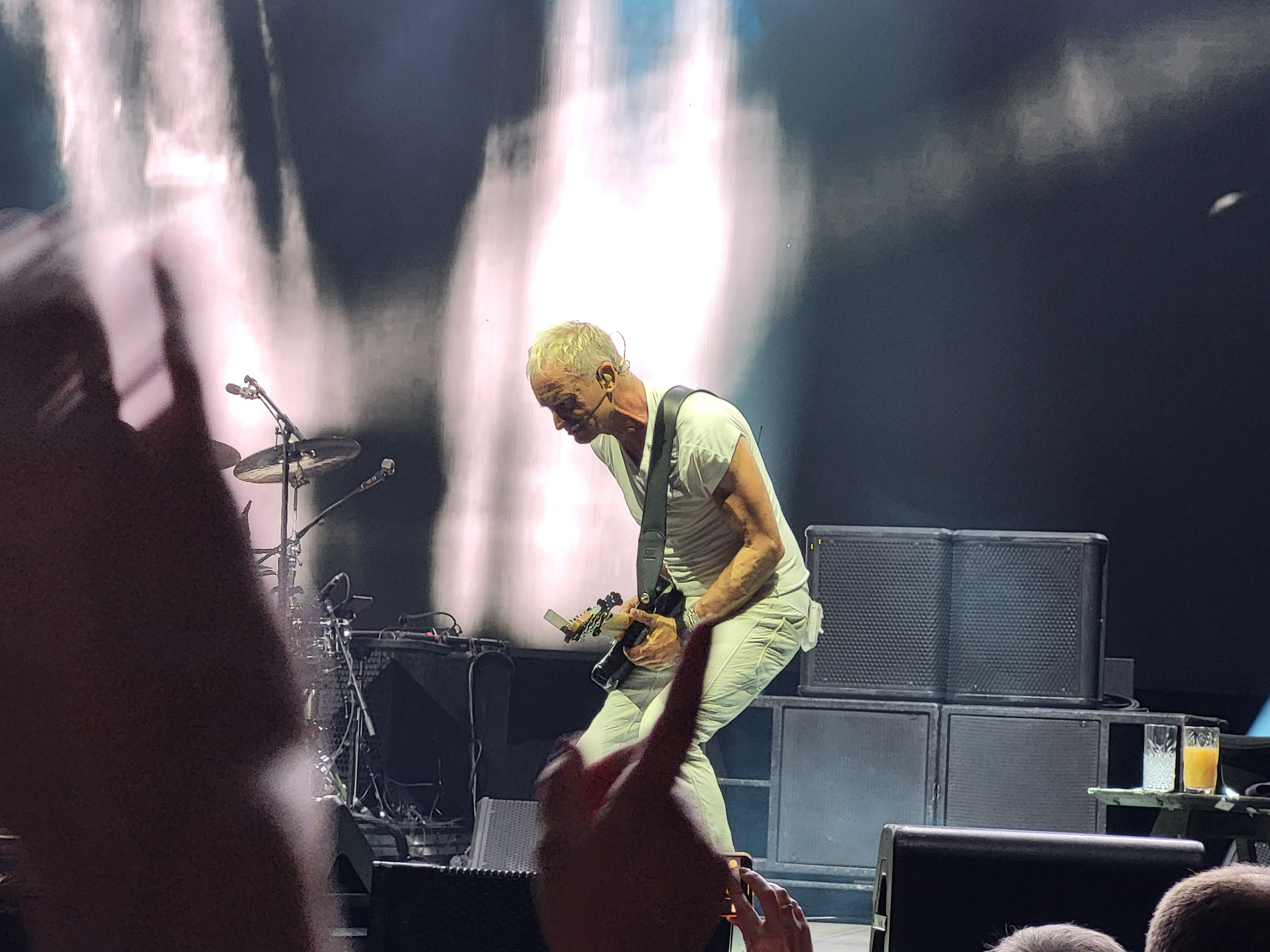
Sting performing in Zagreb during his My Songs Tour, 2024

On 19 March 2021, Sting released Duets, a compilation album comprising 17 tracks of collaborations with various artists including Eric Clapton, Mary J. Blige, Shaggy, Annie Lennox and Sam Moore.

Sting released his fifteenth studio album, The Bridge, on 19 November 2021. It was preceded by the release of the lead single "If It's Love" on 1 September 2021. Sting wrote the set of pop-rock songs "in a year of global pandemic, personal loss, separation, disruption, lockdown and extraordinary social and political turmoil". On 20 November 2021, Sting's single "What Could Have Been", with Ray Chen, was featured in the third act of the League of Legends animated series Arcane; this single was released the same day. Sting then opened The Game Awards 2021 with the song; Todd Marten, for the Los Angeles Times, wrote "The Game Awards began this year with an opening that might have launched the Grammy Awards".

In February 2022, Sting collaborated with Swedish DJ supergroup Swedish House Mafia, releasing a song and music video titled "Redlight". The song used lyrics from the Police's 1979 hit "Roxanne" with a dark electronic feeling. Sting made an appearance in the music video, the song being part of the new album from Swedish House Mafia titled Paradise Again. In February 2022, it was announced that Universal Music Group purchased Sting's catalogue of solo works and those with the Police for an undisclosed amount. Forbes ranked him as the highest-paid solo musician of 2022, with an estimated earnings of $210 million.

Sting performing at the Brooklyn Paramount in 2026

The Wall Street Journal reported that Sting gave a private performance on 17 January 2023 for fifty top Microsoft executives at the 2023 World Economic Forum at Davos. The next day Microsoft announced plans to lay off 10,000 people in what some employees called "as a bad look" for the company. "Some employees thought it wasn't the right time for a company-sponsored Sting concert," wrote Tom Dotan and Sam Schechner. "The theme of the event was sustainability." The event quickly went viral.

In September 2025, Sting's former bandmates Stewart Copeland and Andy Summers filed a lawsuit against Sting with the London High Court, alleging that Sting had underpaid them for royalties earned from "digital exploitation" of the Police's recordings. Sting has denied the allegations and contended that he actually overpaid the former bandmates.

In November 2025, it was announced that Sting would star in an adapted version of his musical The Last Ship at the Metropolitan Opera House in New York, which subsequently toured to Paris, Amsterdam and Brisbane in 2026.

== Artistry ==
Sting's music career has been described as many different genres including pop, rock, new wave, post-punk, reggae, jazz, folk, classical, new-age, worldbeat, and soft rock. AllMusic stated that Sting's recorded catalog was "difficult to pigeonhole" due to the wide range of styles he employs in his music. Though he used a guitar pick in the Police, he began using a fingerstyle technique reminiscent of classical guitar in his solo music.

Currently, Sting plays a 1957 Fender Precision Bass, with a 1955 Precision Bass as a backup. He previously played a 1962 Fender Jazz Bass in his bands Last Exit and the Police. He has also played fretless Fender Precision Basses, as well as basses from Ibanez, Hamer, Steinberger, and Spector.

== Activism ==
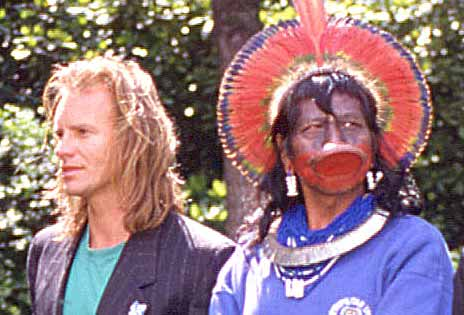
Sting with Raoni Metuktire in Paris, France, 1989

Sting's involvement in human rights began in September 1981, when Martin Lewis included him in the fourth Amnesty International gala, The Secret Policeman's Other Ball, a benefit show co-founded by Monty Python member John Cleese. Sting states, "before [the Ball] I did not know about Amnesty, I did not know about its work, I did not know about torture in the world." Following the example set at the 1979 show by Pete Townshend, Sting performed "Roxanne" and "Message in a Bottle" appearing at all four nights at the Theatre Royal, Drury Lane in London. He also led other musicians (The Secret Police) including Eric Clapton, Jeff Beck, Phil Collins, Donovan, Bob Geldof and Midge Ure in the finale – Sting's reggae-tinged arrangement of Bob Dylan's "I Shall Be Released". The event was the first time that Sting worked with Geldof. His association with Amnesty continued throughout the 1980s and beyond and he took part in Amnesty's human rights concerts.

Sting had shown his interest in social and political issues in his 1980 song "Driven to Tears", an indictment of apathy to world hunger. In November 1984, he joined Band Aid, a charity supergroup primarily made up of the biggest British and Irish musicians of the era, and sang on "Do They Know It's Christmas?" which was recorded at Sarm West Studios in Notting Hill, London. This led to the Live Aid concert in July 1985 at Wembley Stadium, in which Sting performed with Phil Collins and Dire Straits. On 2 July 2005, Sting performed at the Live 8 concert at Hyde Park, London, the follow-up to 1985's Live Aid. In 1984, Sting sang a re-worded version of "Every Breath You Take", titled "Every Bomb You Make" for episode 12 of the first series of the British satirical puppet show Spitting Image. The video for the song shows the puppets of world leaders and political figures of the day, usually with the figure matching the altered lyrics.

In June 1986, Sting reunited with the Police for the last three shows of Amnesty's six-date A Conspiracy of Hope concerts in the US. The day after the final concert, he told NBC's Today Show: "I've been a member of Amnesty and a support member for five years." In 1988, he joined musicians including Peter Gabriel and Bruce Springsteen for a six-week Human Rights Now! tour commemorating the 40th anniversary of the Universal Declaration of Human Rights.

With his wife, Trudie Styler and Raoni Metuktire, a Kayapo Indian leader in Brazil, Sting founded the Rainforest Foundation Fund to help save the rainforests and protect indigenous peoples there. In 1989, he flew to the Altamira Gathering to offer support while promoting his charity. His support continues and includes an annual benefit concert at Carnegie Hall, which has featured Billy Joel, Elton John, James Taylor and others. A species of Colombian tree frog, Dendropsophus stingi, was named after him for his "commitment and efforts to save the rainforest". In 1988, the single "They Dance Alone (Cueca Sola)" chronicled the plight of the mothers, wives and daughters of the "disappeared", political opponents killed by the Pinochet dictatorship in Chile.

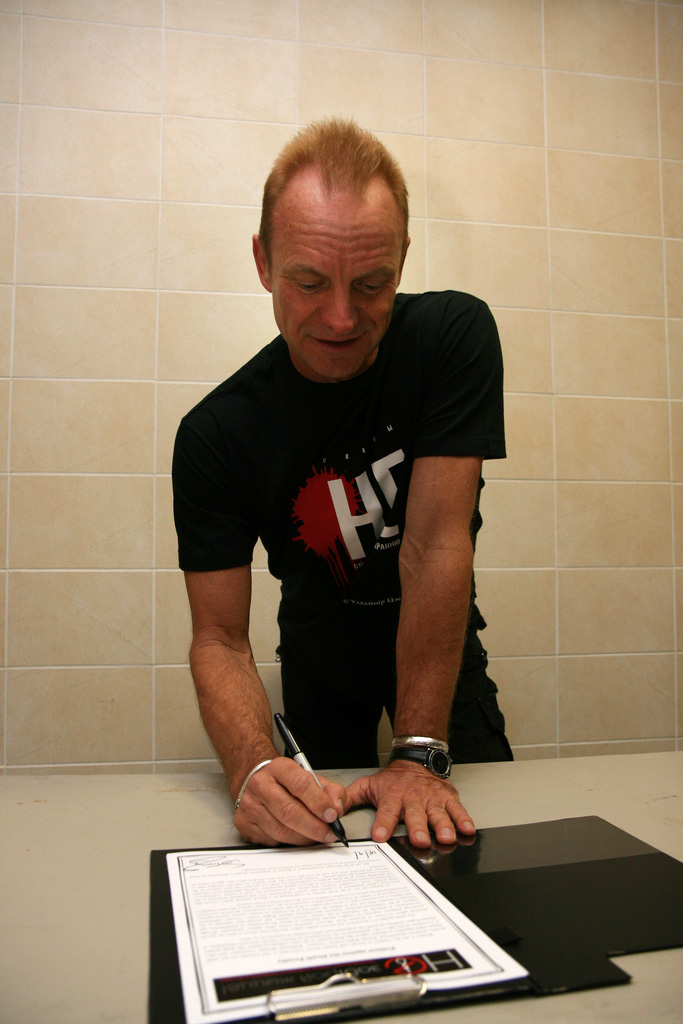
Sting signing a petition in Minsk in 2010 against the death penalty in Belarus, the only European country that still practises it.

On 15 September 1997, Sting joined Paul McCartney, Eric Clapton, Elton John, Phil Collins and Mark Knopfler at London's Royal Albert Hall for Music for Montserrat, a benefit for the Caribbean island devastated by a volcano. Sting and Styler were awarded the Peace Abbey Courage of Conscience award in Sherborn, Massachusetts, on 30 June 2000. In September 2001, Sting took part in America: A Tribute to Heroes singing "Fragile" to raise money for families of victims of the 9/11 attacks in the US. In February 2005, Sting performed the Leeuwin Estate Concert Series in Western Australia: the concert raised $4 million for the 2004 Indian Ocean earthquake and tsunami relief.

In 2007, Sting joined Andy Summers and Stewart Copeland for the closing set at the Live Earth concert at Giants Stadium in East Rutherford, New Jersey. Joined by John Mayer and Kanye West, Sting and the Police ended the show singing "Message in a Bottle" In 2008 Sting contributed to Songs for Tibet to support Tibet and the Dalai Lama, Tenzin Gyatso. On 22 January 2010, Sting performed "Driven to Tears" during Hope for Haiti Now. On 25 April 2010, he performed on the National Mall in Washington, D.C. in the 40th anniversary celebration of Earth Day. Sting is a patron of the Elton John AIDS Foundation.

In 2011, Sting joined more than 30 others in an open letter to British Prime Minister David Cameron for "immediate decriminalisation of drug possession" if a policy review showed it had failed. Sting was quoted: "Giving young people criminal records for minor drug possession serves little purpose — it is time to think of more imaginative ways of addressing drug use in our society."

On 4 July 2011, Sting cancelled a concert for the Astana Day Festival in Astana, Kazakhstan. Amnesty International convinced him to cancel due to concerns over the rights of Kazakh oil and gas workers and their families. On 2 November 2012, Sting appeared on Hurricane Sandy: Coming Together and sang a version of "Message in a Bottle" to raise funds for those affected by a storm on the east coast of the US that week. The show reportedly raised $23 million. Sting also participated as a co-host and musician during the day-long 2015 Norwegian TV campaign, dedicated to the preservation of the rainforest.

In August 2014, Sting was one of 200 public figures who were signatories to a letter to The Guardian expressing their hope that Scotland would vote to reject Scottish independence from the UK in September's referendum on the issue.

Sting publicly supported the United Kingdom remaining in the European Union. On 23 June 2016, in a referendum, the British public voted to leave. In October 2018, Sting was among a group of British musicians who signed an open letter sent to then Prime Minister Theresa May, drafted by Bob Geldof, calling for "a 2nd vote", stating that Brexit will "impact every aspect of the music industry. From touring to sales, to copyright legislation to royalty collation", the letter added: "We dominate the market and our bands, singers, musicians, writers, producers and engineers work all over Europe and the world and, in turn, Europe and the world come to us. Why? Because we are brilliant at it ... [Our music] reaches out, all inclusive, and embraces anyone and everyone. And that truly is what Britain is."

In January 2018, it was reported that Sting had joined the board of advisors of an impact investing fund of JANA Partners LLC named JANA Impact Capital, aimed at serving environmental and social causes.

== Personal life ==
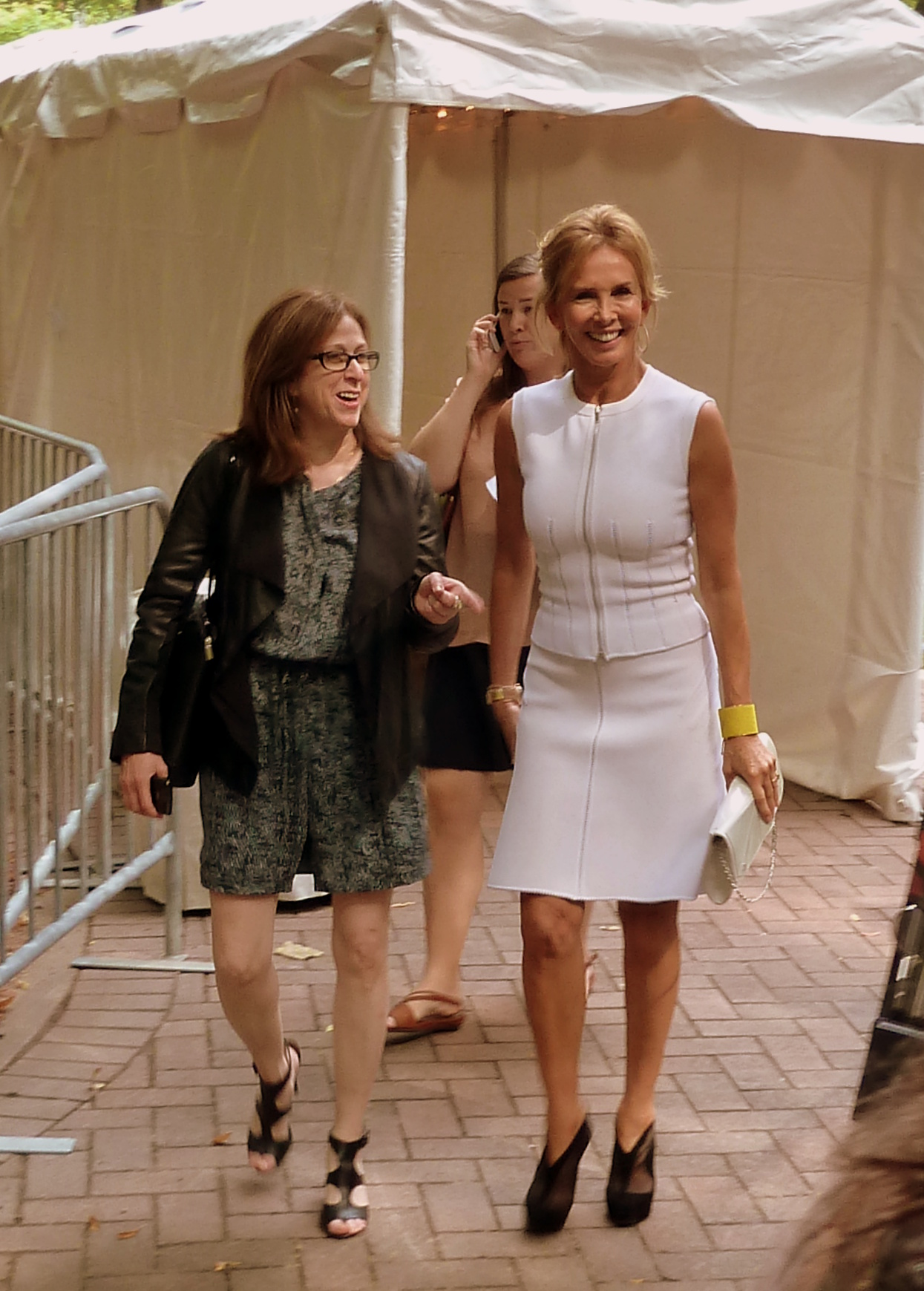
Sting's wife Trudie Styler

In 1969, Sting read the Gormenghast trilogy by Mervyn Peake and later bought the film rights. He named pets, a racehorse, his publishing company and one of his daughters (Fuschia, in the books actually Fuchsia) after characters from the books.

Sting married actress Frances Tomelty on 1 May 1976. They had two children: Joseph (born 23 November 1976), and Fuschia Katherine "Kate" (born 17 April 1982) Sumner. In 1980, Sting became a tax exile in Galway, Ireland.

In 1982, after the birth of his second child, Sting separated from Tomelty. Tomelty and Sting divorced in 1984 after Sting's affair with actress Trudie Styler. The split was controversial; as The Independent reported in 2006, Tomelty "just happened to be Trudie's best friend (Sting and Tomelty lived next door to Styler in Bayswater, west London, for several years before the two of them became lovers)". In a 2025 interview, Sting revealed that Styler was his inspiration for the song "Every Little Thing She Does Is Magic" that he wrote in 1977.

Sting's mother died of cancer in 1986, and his father died of cancer in 1987. To avoid drawing media attention to his parents' funerals, he did not attend either of them.

Sting married Styler at Camden Register Office on 20 August 1992, and the couple had their wedding blessed two days later in the twelfth-century parish church of St Andrew in Great Durnford, Wiltshire, south-west England. Sting and Styler have four children, three of whom were born before their marriage: Brigitte Michael "Mickey" (born 19 January 1984), Jake (born 24 May 1985), Eliot Paulina "Coco" (born 30 July 1990), and Giacomo Luke (born 17 December 1995) Sumner. Coco is founder and lead singer of the group I Blame Coco. Giacomo Luke is the inspiration behind the name of Kentucky Derby-winning horse Giacomo.

In 1995, Sting gave evidence in court against his former accountant (Keith Moore), who had misappropriated £6 million of his money. Moore was jailed for six years. Sting owns several homes worldwide, including Lake House and its sixty-acre estate near Salisbury, Wiltshire; a penthouse at 220 Central Park South in New York City; and the Villa Il Palagio estate in Figline Valdarno, Tuscany. He owned a house in Highgate, 2 The Grove for a number of years, which had previously been the home of violinist Yehudi Menuhin.

For much of his life, Sting's spare time interests and activities have revolved around mental and physical fitness. For many years, he ran five miles (8 km) a day and also performed aerobics. He participated in running races at Parliament Hill and charity runs (including the Race Against Time for Sport Aid in both 1986 and 1988). Around 1990, Danny Paradise introduced him to yoga and he began practising the Ashtanga Vinyasa Yoga series, though he now practises Tantra and Jivamukti Yoga as well. He wrote a foreword to Yoga Beyond Belief, written by Ganga White in 2007. In 2008, he was reported to practise Maharishi Mahesh Yogi's Transcendental Meditation technique. He also practises pilates regularly.

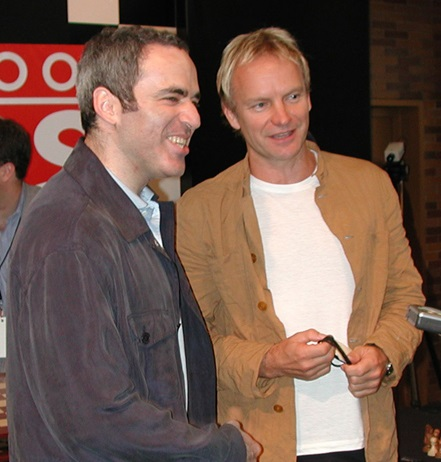
Garry Kasparov and Sting in Times Square, New York, 2000

Also a keen chess player, Sting played chess grandmaster Garry Kasparov in an exhibition game in 2000, along with four bandmates: Dominic Miller, Jason Rebello, Chris Botti and Russ Irwin. Kasparov beat all five simultaneously within fifty minutes.

Sting supports his hometown Premier League football club Newcastle United and in 2009 backed a supporters' campaign against the plan of owner Mike Ashley to sell off naming rights of the club's home stadium St James' Park. He wrote a song in support of Newcastle, called "Black and White Army (Bringing the Pride Back Home)".

In April 2009, the Sunday Times Rich List estimated Sting's wealth at £175 million and ranked him the 322nd wealthiest person in Britain. A decade later, Sting was estimated to have a fortune of £320 million in the 2019 Sunday Times Rich List, making him one of the ten wealthiest people in the British music industry.

In a 2011 interview in Time, Sting said that he was agnostic and that the certainties of religious faith were dangerous.

In August 2014, Sting donated money to the Friends of Tynemouth Outdoor Pool to regenerate the 1920s lido at the southern end of Longsands Beach in Tynemouth, northeast England, a few miles from where he was born.

Sting follows a macrobiotic diet, meaning that he avoids processed foods.

During his interview segment of the Artist's View documentary, Sting mentioned he is colour blind and finds black and white videos appealing because of his colorblindness.

== Discography ==
=== Studio albums ===
- The Dream of the Blue Turtles (1985)
- Nothing Like the Sun (1987)
- The Soul Cages (1991)
- Ten Summoner's Tales (1993)
- Mercury Falling (1996)
- Brand New Day (1999)
- Sacred Love (2003)
- Songs from the Labyrinth (2006)
- If on a Winter's Night... (2009)
- Symphonicities (2010)
- The Last Ship (2013)
- 57th & 9th (2016)
- 44/876 (2018) (with Shaggy)
- My Songs (2019)
- The Bridge (2021)

== Performances and bibliography ==
As actor

- Quadrophenia (1979) – The Ace Face, the King of the Mods, a.k.a. the Bell Boy in the film adaptation of the Who album.
- Radio On (1979) – Just Like Eddie
- The Great Rock 'n' Roll Swindle (1980) – Leader of the Blow Waves. The footage was cut but it later reappeared in the DVD version and in the documentary The Filth and the Fury (2000).
- Artemis 81 (1981) – The angel Helith (BBC TV film)
- Brimstone and Treacle (1982) – Martin Taylor, a drifter
- Dune (1984) – Feyd-Rautha Harkonnen – Sting's likeness was also used for the version of the character that appears in the Cryo Interactive video game adaptation of Dune.
- Titus Groan (1984) – Steerpike (BBC Radio 4 broadcast based on the Mervyn Peake novel)
- Gormenghast (1984) – Steerpike (BBC Radio 4 broadcast based on the Mervyn Peake novel)
- Plenty (1985) – Mick, a black-marketeer
- The Bride (1985) – Baron Frankenstein
- Ligmalion: A Musical for the 80s (1985) – Machiavelli
- Walking to New Orleans (1985) – Busker, singing Moon Over Bourbon Street.
- Julia and Julia (1987) – Daniel, a British gentleman
- The Adventures of Baron Munchausen (1988) – a "heroic officer"
- Stormy Monday (1988) – Finney, a nightclub owner
- The Grotesque (1995), a/k/a Gentlemen Don't Eat Poets and Grave Indiscretion – Fledge
- Lock, Stock and Two Smoking Barrels (1998) – J.D., Eddie's father and owner of a bar.
- Kaamelott: The First Chapter (2021) – Horsa

As himself

- Urgh! A Music War (1982)
- Bring On the Night (1985)
- Saturday Night Live (1991) – host, various
- The Simpsons episode "Radio Bart" (1992)
- The Smell of Reeves and Mortimer Episode 5 (1995)
- The Larry Sanders Show episode "Where Is the Love?" (1996)
- Ally McBeal season four episode "Cloudy Skies, Chance of Parade" (2001)
- Everyone Stares: The Police Inside Out (2006)
- Studio 60 on Sunset Strip (2006)
- Vicar of Dibley Comic Relief special (2007)
- Bee Movie (2007)
- Little Britain USA (2008)
- Brüno (2009)
- Still Bill (2009)
- Do It Again (2010)
- Life's Too Short (2011)
- 2012: Time for Change (2011)
- Can't Stand Losing You: Surviving the Police (2012)
- The Michael J. Fox Show (2013) (singing "August Wind" from The Last Ship)
- 20 Feet from Stardom (2013)
- Zoolander 2 (2016)
- Have a Good Trip: Adventures in Psychedelics (2020)
- Only Murders in the Building (2021)
- The Book of Solutions (2023)

=== Broadway and Tour credits ===
Year	Title	Notes
1982	Rock 'N Roll! The First 5,000 Years	Writer: "Message in a Bottle"
1989	3 Penny Opera	Role: Macheath
2014	The Last Ship	Music and lyrics Role: Jackie White
2019	The Last Ship	Music and lyrics Role: Jackie White
2020	The Last Ship	Music and lyrics Role: Jackie White
2025–26	The Last Ship	Music and lyrics Role: Jackie White

=== Publications ===
- Broken Music. New York: Simon & Schuster. 2003. ISBN 0-7434-5081-7.
- Lyrics by – Sting. New York: Simon & Schuster. 2007. ISBN 978-1-84737-167-6.

== Concert tours ==
- Dream of the Blue Turtles (1985–1986)
- Nothing Like the Sun (1987–1988)
- The Soul Cages (1991–1992)
- Ten Summoners Tales (1992–1995)
- Mercury Falling (1996–1997)
- Brand New Day (1999–2001)
- Sacred Love (2003–2005)
- Broken Music (2005–2006)
- Songs From The Labyrinth (2006–2007)
- Symphonicity (2010–2011)
- Back to Bass (2011–2013)
- Summer 2012
- Summer 2013
- On Stage Together (2014–2015) (with Paul Simon)
- Summer 2015
- Rock Paper Scissors (2016) (with Peter Gabriel)
- Summer 2016
- 57th & 9th (2017)
- 44/876 Tour (2018) (with Shaggy)
- My Songs (2019, 2021–2024)
- 3.0 (2024–2026)

== See also ==
- List of artists who reached number one in the United States
- List of artists who reached number one on the U.S. Dance Club Songs chart
- Timeline of Billboard number-one dance songs
- List of British Grammy Award winners and nominees
- List of music artists by net worth
- Lists of Billboard number-one singles
- Mononym

== Bibliography ==
- Berryman, James (2005). Sting and I. John Blake. ISBN 1-84454-107-X.
- Berryman, James (2000). A Sting in the Tale. Mirage Publishing. ISBN 1-902578-13-9.
- Cannell, Paul (2012). Fuckin' Hell It's Paul Cannell. Poodle Publishing. ISBN 9781475020793.
- Carr, Paul (2017). Sting: From Northern Skies to Fields of Gold. Reaktion Books. ISBN 978-1-78023-813-5.
- Clarkson, Wensley (1999) [1996]. Sting: The Secret Life of Gordon Sumner. New York: Thunder's Mouth Press. ISBN 1-56025-226-X.
- Gable, Christopher (2009). The Words and Music of Sting. Praeger. ISBN 978-0-275-99360-3.
- Marienberg, Evyatar (2021). Sting and Religion: The Catholic-Shaped Imagination of a Rock Icon. Eugene, Oregon: Cascade Books / Wipf & Stock. ISBN 978-1-7252-7226-2.
- Sandford, Christopher (1998). Sting: Demolition Man. New York: Carroll & Graf. ISBN 0-7867-0603-1.
- Sting (2003). Broken Music: A Memoir. New York: Dial Press. ISBN 0-385-33678-0.
- West, Aaron J. (2015). Sting and The Police: Walking in Their Footsteps. Rowman & Littlefield. ISBN 978-0-8108-8490-8.
