= Bring On the Night (film) =

1985 film by Michael Apted

- DVD cover
- Directed by: Michael Apted
- Written by: Michael Apted
- Produced by: David Manson
- Starring: Sting; Omar Hakim; Darryl Jones; Kenny Kirkland; Branford Marsalis; Dolette McDonald; Janice Pendarvis
- Cinematography: Ralf D. Bode
- Edited by: Robert K. Lambert; Melvin Shapiro
- Music by: Sting, Sergei Prokofiev for Russians, Alex Atkins, J. B. Lenoir for Been Down So Long.
- Distributed by: The Samuel Goldwyn Company
- Release date: November 8, 1985; (United States)
- Running time: 97 minutes
- Countries: United Kingdom; United States
- Languages: English, French
- Budget: $2.5 million
- Box office: $1.9 million

Bring On the Night is a 1985 documentary film directed by Michael Apted, focusing on the jazz-inspired project and band led by the British musician Sting during the early stages of his solo career and first solo tour. Some of the songs in the film appeared on his debut solo album The Dream of the Blue Turtles. The film won the Grammy Award for "Best Music Video, Long Form" at the 1987 Grammy Awards.

Much of the film takes place inside the French Château de Courson outside of Paris, where the band met, lived and rehearsed for nine days. Near the end of the film the band plays their first concert at Théâtre Mogador in Paris. The final scene shows Sting attending his wife Trudie Styler as she gives birth to Jake, their second child and Sting's fourth. Sting said he "resisted" Apted's suggestion of filming the birth, but then he "realized there's a tenuous link between the band being born and the baby, so it fit."

The film was named after the Police song "Bring On the Night" (1979), it is also the title of Sting's 1986 live album featuring music recorded during the 1985 tour chronicled in the film.

== Cast ==
Apted is heard in the film, asking interview questions, but he is not visible or credited. Seen on screen:

- Miles Copeland III – Sting's manager
- Gil Friesen – president of A&M Records, executive producer
- Vic Garbarini – organizer of the band, A&R with A&M Records
- Omar Hakim – drummer
- Darryl Jones – bass guitarist
- Kenny Kirkland – keyboardist
- Branford Marsalis – saxophonist
- Dolette McDonald – backing vocalist
- Janice Pendarvis – backing vocalist
- Lou Salvatore – crew
- Sting – bandleader, vocalist, guitarist
- Trudie Styler – Sting's wife
- Kim Turner – Sting's right-hand man, logistics manager
- Colleen Atwood – costume designer
- Max Vadukul – portrait photographer
- Jake Sumner – Sting's newborn son

== Production ==
Unusually for a documentary, Apted shot the film in 35 mm, focusing primarily on band rehearsals, musician interactions, and interviews with every musician in the band.

The Samuel Goldwyn Company acquired the film in September 1985.

== Release ==
The film opened on November 8, 1985 on 409 screens in the United States and Canada and grossed a disappointing $1,132,112 in its opening week. It grossed a total of $1.9 million in the United States and Canada.

The film was released on DVD in 2005.

== Reception ==
The New York Times noted that Sting appeared "aloof" and "elitist" at the beginning of the film, but loosened up with his new black bandmates through a series of rehearsals. Sting's "pushy" manager Miles Copeland III is seen frequently in the film, complaining about the band's on-stage wardrobe, and venting his displeasure to Colleen Atwood, the costume designer.
