= Kate & Leopold =

2001 romantic comedy film by James Mangold

- Theatrical release poster
- Directed by: James Mangold
- Screenplay by: James Mangold; Steven Rogers
- Story by: Steven Rogers
- Produced by: Cathy Konrad
- Starring: Meg Ryan; Hugh Jackman; Liev Schreiber; Breckin Meyer; Natasha Lyonne; Bradley Whitford; Philip Bosco
- Cinematography: Stuart Dryburgh
- Edited by: David Brenner
- Music by: Rolfe Kent
- Production company: Konrad Pictures
- Distributed by: Miramax Films
- Release date: December 25, 2001
- Running time: 123 minutes
- Country: United States
- Language: English
- Budget: $48 million
- Box office: $76 million (worldwide)

Kate & Leopold is a 2001 American romantic comedy film that tells a story of a physicist by the name of Stuart (Liev Schreiber), who accidentally pulls his great‑great‑grandfather, Leopold (Hugh Jackman), through a time portal from 19th‑century New York to the present, where Leopold and Stuart's ex‑girlfriend, Kate (Meg Ryan), fall in love with each other.

== Plot ==
On 28 April 1876, Leopold is the orphaned and impoverished third Duke of Albany, living in New York City with his uncle, Millard Mountbatten, under the care of the butler by the name of Otis. Conversant with the arts and sciences, he has designed and modelled a prototype Otis elevator, but Uncle Millard exhorts him to return to reality and marry a wealthy American heiress.

While sketching the Brooklyn Bridge during a public meeting dedicated to the completion of its Manhattan tower, Leopold notices Stuart Besser taking photographs with an anachronistically small camera. Stuart is an amateur physicist (and a great‑great‑grandson of Leopold) from 21st‑century New York, who has discovered the existence of gravitational time portals. At the evening ball, during which Leopold is to announce his bride-to-be, he sees Stuart photographing design sketches in the duke's study. Chasing Stuart, he tries to save him from falling off the unfinished bridge, only for both to fall into the time portal.

Leopold regains consciousness on a Wednesday morning in the year 2001 in Stuart's apartment at 88 White Street, Manhattan. Stuart explains that the portal will reopen on the next Monday, until which time Leopold should stay in Stuart's apartment. While taking his dog out, Stuart is injured by falling into the empty elevator shaft and, after ranting about his scientific discovery in the hospital, is involuntarily committed to a mental institution. According to Stuart's concept, Leopold's time travel to the 21st century has caused a widespread "occlusion" of elevators, and may cause the disappearance of Stuart himself if Leopold does not go back to 1876 on Monday.

Leopold is intrigued by the cynical and ambitious Kate McKay, Stuart's ex-girlfriend who lives downstairs. He says that she produces the impression of a "career woman" and, upon learning that she works in market research, ironically remarks: "Mm. A fine avocation for women, research. Perfect for the feminine mind." (Later on, Kate's boss tells her the same thing: "You skew male. You're like a man. A man who understands women—their desires, their needs. You understand them, but you're not really one of them.") Kate shrugs it off and demands that Leopold take Stuart's dog for a walk. Back at the apartment, he befriends Charlie—Kate's brother and an aspiring actor, who believes him to be an actor as well, steadfast to his character.

On Thursday morning, Kate becomes impressed by Leopold's eloquent exposition of how important the tastiness of food is to the quality of human life. She takes him to an audition for a TV commercial pitching a fat-free butter, Farmer's Bounty, produced by the English company Jansen Foods, which is being taken over by Kate's company, Camden Research Group. After the successful audition, Kate and Leopold stop by a horse-drawn tourist carriage to hail a taxi, at which moment a thief snatches Kate's briefcase and flees into Central Park. Seeing Kate run after the purse-snatcher, Leopold borrows one of the horses and hurries to help her. Riding together with Kate, he drives the thief into an impasse and forces him to drop the briefcase. Bedazzled by the sight of Leopold riding on a white horse to her rescue, Kate begins to admit that his 19th century dukedom may be "for real".

On Friday, Leopold hires a violinist and invites Kate to a rooftop dinner, which ends with a waltz and the first kiss.

On Saturday, they stroll about Lower Manhattan and come across Uncle Millard's home at 1 Hanover Square, where Leopold retrieves a metal box with his boyhood treasures, including his mother's ring, from a drawer hidden in his room's wall. In the evening, he tries to propose to Kate, but she falls asleep on his lap.

On Sunday, Leopold acts in a Farmer's Bounty commercial, but walks off the set upon finding the diet margarine disgusting. Leopold chastises Kate about integrity, to which she counters that he lacks connection with reality. Realizing that their time together is nearly over, both spend the evening in subdued contemplation.

On Monday morning, Stuart escapes from the asylum and sends Leopold to his own time, which makes the elevators work again. Charlie notices Kate in a photo taken at Leopold's ball on 28 April 1876, and shows the picture to Stuart, who realizes that Kate's future is in the past. That night, when Kate is about to accept her promotion at the Anglo-American merger meeting held, to her surprise, at 1 Hanover Square, Stuart and Charlie tell her that in order to be with Leopold she has to jump off the Brooklyn Bridge within the next 23 minutes. Kate rejects their suggestion as absurd and goes to give her acceptance speech, during which she sees herself, wearing the same evening dress, in one of Stuart's photos. Her speech falters to a musing and terminates with an apology for having to leave, at which point the three of them rush to the bridge.

Having made it through the portal, Kate appears in 1876 and runs to 1 Hanover Square, where the Anglo-American engagement is to take place. Just when Leopold is about to announce his bride of convenience, Kate storms into the ballroom, and he instead announces her name, styled as "Kate McKay, of the McKays of Massapequa". Among the shocked guests, Kate and Leopold reunite with a kiss and dance a bridal waltz. Thus Kate turns out to be Stuart's great‑great‑grandmother.

== Cast ==
- Meg Ryan as Kate McKay
- Hugh Jackman as His Grace Leopold Alexis Elijah Walker Thomas Gareth Mountbatten, 3rd Duke of Albany
- Liev Schreiber as Stuart Besser
- Breckin Meyer as Charlie McKay
- Natasha Lyonne as Darci
- Bradley Whitford as J. J. Camden
- Paxton Whitehead as Millard Mountbatten
- Spalding Gray as Dr. Geisler
- Josh Stamberg as Bob
- Matthew Sussman as Phil
- Charlotte Ayanna as Patrice
- Philip Bosco as Otis
- Cole Hawkins as Hector
- Kristen Schaal as Miss Tree
- Stephanie Sanditz as Gretchen
- Viola Davis as Policewoman
- Andrew Jack as John A. Roebling

== Alternative versions ==
References suggesting that Kate is Stuart's great-great-grandmother were censored from the film just a few days before the theatrical release—according to director James Mangold, due to "2 critics who were horrified by Liev Schreiber's distant relationship to Leo". Those two critics were Roger Ebert and Richard Roeper. The previous four-year relationship of Stuart and Kate is classified as illegally incestuous in many jurisdictions, because she is his lineal ancestor (see Legality of incest#Table).

The following scenes were excised:

- References suggesting that Kate has a genetic relationship to Stuart.
- A scene where Ryan appears in the background of a 19th-century party.
- A cameo by director James Mangold, where he plays a director whose film is being changed to meet the demands of a test screening.

The director's cut, lasting 123 minutes, was released on DVD (Region 4) on 29 January 2003, and on Blu-ray (Region A) on 10 April 2012. The theatrical cut, lasting 118 minutes, exists only on DVD, first released on 11 June 2002.

== Music ==
The soundtrack to Kate & Leopold was released on December 25, 2001.

Kate & Leopold (Music from the Miramax Motion Picture)
No.	Title	Artist	Length
1.	"A Clock in New York"	Rolfe Kent	1:26
2.	"I Want Him Resplendent"	Rolfe Kent	1:25
3.	"Leopold Chases Stuart to Brooklyn"	Rolfe Kent	1:54
4.	"That Was Your Best?"	Rolfe Kent	1:17
5.	"Let's Go!"	Rolfe Kent	3:03
6.	"Leopold Sees the Completed Bridge"	Rolfe Kent	0:49
7.	"You Did So Great (Kate's Theme)"	Rolfe Kent	1:18
8.	"Galloping"	Rolfe Kent	1:21
9.	"Dearest Kate..."	Rolfe Kent	2:14
10.	"Prolixin / Leopold & Charlie Buy Flowers"	Rolfe Kent	2:20
11.	"Charlie Wins Patrice, Leopold Wins Kate"	Rolfe Kent	3:41
12.	"Secret Drawer"	Rolfe Kent	2:01
13.	"Time for Bed"	Rolfe Kent	2:14
14.	"Charlie Realizes Leopold Was for Real"	Rolfe Kent	1:31
15.	"Kate Goes to the Awards"	Rolfe Kent	2:24
16.	"Kate Sees the Pictures - "I Have to Go""	Rolfe Kent	2:54
17.	"You Have to Cross the Girder"	Rolfe Kent	1:51
18.	"Back in 1876 - Waltz"	Rolfe Kent	2:12
19.	"Back Where I Belong"	Jula Bell	2:49
20.	"Until..."	Sting	3:11
Total length:			41:55

== Reception ==
=== Critical response ===
On Rotten Tomatoes, the film has an approval rating of 52% based on reviews from 133 critics, and an average rating of 5.3/10. The site's consensus is: "Though Hugh Jackman charms, Kate & Leopold is bland and predictable, and the time travel scenario lacks logic." On Metacritic, the film has a weighted average score of 44 based on 27 reviews, indicating "mixed or average" reviews. Audiences surveyed by CinemaScore gave the film a grade B+ on scale of A to F.

Roger Ebert of the Chicago Sun-Times wrote: "Meg Ryan does this sort of thing about as well as it can possibly be done, and after Sleepless in Seattle and You've Got Mail, here is another ingenious plot that teases us with the possibility that true love will fail, while winking that, of course, it will prevail." Peter Travers of Rolling Stone called it "comfort food for bruised romantics".

Lael Loewenstein of Variety wrote: "A time-travel romantic comedy whose best elements—Meg Ryan and Hugh Jackman—overcome distracting plot holes, loose threads and assorted contrivances to make for a mostly charming and diverting tale."

=== Accolades ===
Hugh Jackman was nominated in 2001 for the Golden Globe Award for Best Actor – Motion Picture Musical or Comedy. The film won the Golden Globe Award for Best Song for the song "Until...", written and performed by Sting. The same song was also nominated for the Academy Award for Best Original Song, and Sting performed the song during the ceremony.
