= Back to Bass Tour =

2011–13 concert tour by Sting

- World tour by Sting
- Start date: 21 October 2011
- End date: 31 July 2013
- Legs: 7
- No. of shows: 157

Sting concert chronology
- Symphonicity Tour (2010–11); Back to Bass Tour (2011–13); On Stage Together Tour (2014–15)

The Back to Bass Tour was a concert tour by English musician and singer-songwriter Sting. The tour's start coincided with the release of 25 Years and The Best of 25 Years, two compilation albums that commemorated the 25th anniversary of Sting's solo career.

== Background ==
The tour was officially announced on 12 September 2011 via his official page. The first announcements concerned shows to be held in Northern America between October and December 2011. On 15 November 2011, the European dates were announced. That leg of the tour ended in March 2012, followed by four performances in Africa.

Sting returned for the a summer tour to Northern America, playing seven shows in the beginning of June before heading back to Europe. He played several shows at festivals throughout June and July 2012.

In June 2012, Sting announced a return to Europe in fall, playing shows predominantly in France and Central Europe during November 2012.

In October 2012 ahead of his Asian tour, Sting, an environmental advocate, requested for his Manila show to be relocated from the SM Mall of Asia Arena to the Smart Araneta Coliseum due to allegations of the initial venue's owners, SM, being involved in deforestation projects.

On 22 January 2013 it was announced that Sting would continue to tour as part of the Back to Bass Tour in the Summer of 2013, with various shows being announced for Europe and Northern America. The tour would commence at the end of May 2013 with a concert in Kelowna, Canada, after a 10-month break. Further announcements of dates were made all through February and March, some of them explicitly stating that "... additional cities [are] to be announced!". The final dates were announced on his official page on 18 April 2013, with a concert being held at the famous Montreux Jazz Festival. The 2013 Summer tour will have 40 stops in Northern America and Europe, and will be most likely the last leg of this tour.

== Tour dates ==
Date	City	Country	Venue
North America
21 October 2011	Boston	United States	Wang Theatre
22 October 2011	Boston	United States	Wang Theatre
24 October 2011	Wallingford	United States	Oakdale Theatre
26 October 2011	Upper Darby Township	United States	Tower Theater
27 October 2011	Upper Darby Township	United States	Tower Theater
29 October 2011	Washington, D.C.	United States	DAR Constitution Hall
1 November 2011	Toronto	Canada	Massey Hall
2 November 2011	Toronto	Canada	Massey Hall
5 November 2011	Chicago	United States	Queen Elizabeth Theatre
6 November 2011	Detroit	United States	Fox Theatre
8 November 2011	New York City	United States	Roseland Ballroom
9 November 2011	New York City	United States	Roseland Ballroom
10 November 2011	Washington, D.C.	United States	DAR Constitution Hall
12 November 2011	Miami Beach	United States	Jackie Gleason Theater
13 November 2011	Miami Beach	United States	Jackie Gleason Theater
16 November 2011	Grand Prairie	United States	Verizon Theatre
17 November 2011	Houston	United States	Verizon Wireless Theater
18 November 2011	Houston	United States	Verizon Wireless Theater
20 November 2011	Denver	United States	Wells Fargo Theatre
22 November 2011	Phoenix	United States	Comerica Theatre
25 November 2011	Las Vegas	United States	The Colosseum at Caesars Palace
26 November 2011	Reno	United States	Reno Events Center
28 November 2011	Los Angeles	United States	Wiltern Theatre
29 November 2011	Los Angeles	United States	Wiltern Theatre
30 November 2011	Los Angeles	United States	Wiltern Theatre
2 December 2011	San Francisco	United States	Nob Hill Masonic Center
3 December 2011	San Francisco	United States	Nob Hill Masonic Center
5 December 2011	Seattle	United States	Paramount Theatre
6 December 2011	Seattle	United States	Paramount Theatre
8 December 2011	Vancouver	Canada	Queen Elizabeth Theatre
9 December 2011	Vancouver	Canada	Queen Elizabeth Theatre
10 December 2011	Vancouver	Canada	Queen Elizabeth Theatre
Europe
5 February 2012	Newcastle	England	Sage Gateshead
7 February 2012	Amsterdam	Netherlands	Heineken Music Hall
9 February 2012	Gothenburg	Sweden	Lisebergshallen
10 February 2012	Gothenburg	Sweden	Lisebergshallen
12 February 2012	Stockholm	Sweden	Waterfront
13 February 2012	Copenhagen	Denmark	Falkoner Theatret
15 February 2012	Warsaw	Poland	Sala Kongresowa
16 February 2012	Warsaw	Poland	Sala Kongresowa
18 February 2012	Prague	Czech Republic	Congress Center
19 February 2012	Vienna	Austria	Gasometer
21 February 2012	Grenoble	France	Summum
22 February 2012	Toulouse	France	Zénith de Toulouse
24 February 2012	Clermont-Ferrand	France	Zénith d'Auvergne
25 February 2012	Marseille	France	Le Dôme
26 February 2012	Monaco		Opéra de Monte-Carlo
28 February 2012	Munich	Germany	Kesselhaus
29 February 2012	Frankfurt	Germany	Jahrhunderthalle
2 March 2012	Cologne	Germany	E-Werk
4 March 2012	Brussels	Belgium	Cirque Royale
5 March 2012	Brussels	Belgium	Cirque Royale
7 March 2012	Stuttgart	Germany	Beethovensaal
8 March 2012	Lille	France	Zénith de Lille
10 March 2012	Berlin	Germany	Columbiahalle
12 March 2012	Esch-sur-Alzette	Luxembourg	Rockhal
13 March 2012	Paris	France	Zénith de Paris
14 March 2012	Paris	France	Zénith de Paris
16 March 2012	Manchester	England	O_{2} Apollo Manchester
17 March 2012	Glasgow	Scotland	Clyde Auditorium
19 March 2012	London	England	Hammersmith Apollo
20 March 2012	London	England	Hammersmith Apollo
21 March 2012	London	England	Hammersmith Apollo
Africa
24 March 2012	Johannesburg	South Africa	Coca-Cola Dome
25 March 2012	Johannesburg	South Africa	Coca-Cola Dome
27 March 2012	Cape Town	South Africa	Grand West Arena
28 March 2012	Cape Town	South Africa	Grand West Arena
North America
2 June 2012	Thackerville	United States	WinStar World Casino
3 June 2012	Thackerville	United States	WinStar World Casino
5 June 2012	St. Louis	United States	Fox Theatre
7 June 2012	Atlanta	United States	Chastain Park Amphitheater
9 June 2012	Atlantic City	United States	Borgata
11 June 2012	Montreal	Canada	Place des Arts
12 June 2012	Lewiston	United States	Artpark
Europe
16 June 2012^{[A]}	Helsinki	Finland	Lasipalatsi
17 June 2012^{[B]}	Oslo	Norway	Frognerbadet
19 June 2012^{[C]}	Bergen	Norway	Koengen
21 June 2012	Odense	Denmark	Engen Fruens Bøge
23 June 2012^{[D]}	Werchter	Belgium	Werchter Festival Grounds
25 June 2012	Prague	Czech Republic	O_{2} Arena
26 June 2012	Budapest	Hungary	Budapest Arena
27 June 2012	Zagreb	Croatia	Arena Zagreb
29 June 2012^{[E]}	Oeiras	Portugal	Jardim do Palácio do Marquês de Pombal
30 June 2012	Marbella	Spain	Hotel Puente Romano Tennis Club
1 July 2012^{[F]}	Ibiza	Spain	Sant Antoni de Portmany
3 July 2012	Amsterdam	Netherlands	Ziggo Dome
4 July 2012^{[G]}	Henley-on-Thames	England	Berkshire Bank of the River Thames
6 July 2012^{[H]}	Cognac	France	Hotel Puente Romano Tennis Club
7 July 2012^{[I]}	Albi	France	Scene Pratgraussals
8 July 2012^{[J]}	Argelès-sur-Mer	France	Festival Grounds
10 July 2012	Piazzola	Italy	Anfiteatro Camerini
12 July 2012	Molfetta	Italy	Molo del Porto
13 July 2012	Taormina	Italy	Teatro Antico
15 July 2012^{[K]}	Perugia	Italy	Festival Grounds
18 July 2012^{[L]}	Toulon	France	Festival Grounds
19 July 2012^{[M]}	Nyon	Switzerland	L'Asse Festival Grounds
21 July 2012^{[N]}	Carhaix-Plouguer	France	Festival Grounds
22 July 2012	Arcachon	France	Stade Vélodrome d'Arcachon
25 July 2012	Moscow	Russia	Olimpiski
27 July 2012	St. Petersburg	Russia	New Arena
29 July 2012	Riga	Latvia	Riga Arena
31 July 2012	Kaunas	Lithuania	Žalgiris Arena
7 November 2012	Strasbourg	France	Le Zénith
9 November 2012	Lyon	France	Halle Tony Garnier
10 November 2012	Amnéville	France	Galaxie
12 November 2012	Nice	France	Palais Nikaïa
14 November 2012	Bordeaux	France	Patinoire Mériadeck
15 November 2012	Rouen	France	Le Zénith
17 November 2012	Košice	Slovakia	Steel Aréna
19 November 2012	Ostrava	Czech Republic	ČEZ Aréna
21 November 2012	Łódź	Poland	Atlas Arena
23 November 2012	Krasnodar	Russia	Basket Hall
24 November 2012	Rostov-on-Don	Russia	Palace of Sports
Asia
26 November 2012	Istanbul	Turkey	Ataköy Athletics Arena
28 November 2012	Beirut	Lebanon	B.I.E.L.
1 December 2012	Taipei	Taiwan	Taipei Arena
2 December 2012	Hong Kong	China	Hong Kong Convention and Exhibition Centre
5 December 2012	Seoul	South Korea	Olympic Gymnastics Arena
9 December 2012	Quezon City	Philippines	Smart Araneta Coliseum
12 December 2012	Bangkok	Thailand	Impact Arena
13 December 2012	Singapore		Singapore Indoor Stadium
15 December 2012	Jakarta	Indonesia	Mata Elang International Stadium
14 March 2013	Abu Dhabi	United Arab Emirates	Du Arena
North America
7 April 2013^{[O]}	Atlanta	United States	Centennial Olympic Park
30 May 2013	Kelowna	Canada	Prospera Place
31 May 2013	Victoria	Canada	Save-On-Foods Memorial Centre
2 June 2013	San Francisco	United States	America's Cup Pavilion
3 June 2013	Santa Barbara	United States	Santa Barbara Bowl
5 June 2013	Morrison	United States	Red Rocks Amphitheatre
7 June 2013^{[P]}	Highland Park	United States	Ravinia Park
8 June 2013^{[P]}	Highland Park	United States	Ravinia Park
10 June 2013	Atlanta	United States	Chastain Park Amphitheater
12 June 2013	Baltimore	United States	Pier Six Pavilion
14 June 2013	Atlantic City	United States	Borgata Event Center
15 June 2013	Atlantic City	United States	Borgata Event Center
17 June 2013	Kitchener	Canada	Memorial Auditorium
18 June 2013	Kingston	Canada	K-Rock Centre
20 June 2013	Bangor	United States	Waterfront Pavilion
21 June 2013	Boston	United States	Bank of America Pavilion
22 June 2013	Uncasville	United States	Mohegan Sun Arena
24 June 2013	Summerside	Canada	Credit Union Place
26 June 2013	St. Johns	Canada	Mile One Centre
Europe
29 June 2013^{[Q]}	Oświęcim	Poland	Stadion Mosir
1 July 2013^{[R]}	Cork	Ireland	The Docklands
3 July 2013	Gothenburg	Sweden	Liseberg
4 July 2013	Rättvik	Sweden	Dalhalla
6 July 2013^{[S]}	Arras	France	Grand'Place
8 July 2013	Verona	Italy	Verona Arena
9 July 2013	Rome	Italy	Foro Italico
10 July 2013	Mainz	Germany	Zollhafen-Nordmole
12 July 2013^{[T]}	Stavern	Norway	Festival Grounds
13 July 2013	Copenhagen	Denmark	Tivoli Gardens
14 July 2013^{[U]}	Rotterdam	Netherland	Ahoy
16 July 2013^{[V]}	Montreux	Switzerland	Auditorium Stravinski
18 July 2013^{[W]}	Juan-les-Pins	France	Seaside Stage
19 July 2013^{[X]}	Zürich	Switzerland	Festival Grounds
21 July 2013	Kazan	Russia	TatNeft Arena
22 July 2013	Samara	Russia	Palace of Sports
24 July 2013	Chelyabinsk	Russia	Traktor Sport Palace
25 July 2013	Yekaterinburg	Russia	Ice Palace
27 July 2013^{[Y]}	Tienen	Belgium	Grote Markt
29 July 2013	Cattolica	Italy	Cattolica Arena della Regina
31 July 2013	Bucharest	Romania	Romexpo

Festivals and other miscellaneous performances

^{A} This concert was a part of "Helsinki Classic Festival"
^{B} This concert was a part of "Norwegian Wood Festival"
^{C} This concert was a part of "Bergen Calling Festival"
^{D} This concert was a part of "TW Classic Festival"
^{E} This concert was a part of "EDP CoolJazz Festival"
^{F} This concert was a part of "Ibiza 123 Festival"
^{G} This concert was a part of "Henley Festival"
^{H} This concert was a part of "Cognac Blues Festival"
^{I} This concert was a part of "Pause Guitare Festival"
^{J} This concert was a part of "Les Déferlantes Festival"
^{K} This concert was a part of "Umbria Jazz Festival"
^{L} This concert was a part of "Voix du Gaou Festival"
^{M} This concert was a part of "Paléo Festival"

^{N} This concert was a part of "Vieilles Charrues Festival"
^{O} This concert was a part of "Big Dance Concert Series"
^{P} This concert was a part of "Ravinia Festival"
^{Q} This concert was a part of "Life Festival"
^{R} This concert was a part of "Live at the Marquee Festival"
^{S} This concert was a part of "Main Square Festival"
^{T} This concert was a part of "Stavern Festival"
^{U} This concert was a part of "North Sea Jazz Festival"
^{V} This concert was a part of "Montreux Jazz Festival"
^{W} This concert was a part of "Jazz à Juan"
^{X} This concert was a part of "Live at Sunset Festival"
^{Y} This concert was a part of "Suikerrock Festival"

== Musicians ==
- Sting – vocals, bass, guitars
- Dominic Miller – guitars, bass, backing vocals
- Vinnie Colaiuta – drums, percussion
- David Sancious – piano, keyboards (March 2012 – 2013)
- Peter Tickell – fiddle, oud
- Jo Lawry – vocals, violin
- Rufus Miller – guitars, backing vocals (2011 – March 2012)
