= Until... (Sting song) =

Song by Sting

from the album Kate & Leopold: Music from the Miramax Motion Picture
- Released: 2001
- Genre: Waltz
- Length: 3:11
- Songwriter(s): Sting

"Until..." is a waltz/ballad song written and performed by Sting, from the 2001 Academy Award-nominated and Golden Globe-winning film Kate & Leopold. The song won the Golden Globe Award for Best Original Song and was nominated for the Academy Award in the same category. It has been covered in various genres.
