= We Work the Black Seam =

1985 song by Sting

Single by Sting

from the album The Dream of the Blue Turtles
- B-side: "The Dream of the Blue Turtles"
- Released: June 1986 (EU and Aus)
- Recorded: March – April 1985
- Studio: Blue Wave Studio, Saint Philip, Barbados and Le Studio, Morin-Heights, Quebec, Canada
- Genre: Pop rock; jazz rock
- Length: 5:42
- Label: A&M
- Songwriter: Sting
- Producers: Sting and Pete Smith

Sting singles chronology
"Moon Over Bourbon Street" (1986)	"We Work the Black Seam" (1986)	"We'll Be Together" (1987)

"We Work the Black Seam" is a protest song recorded by British musician Sting for his 1985 debut solo album The Dream of the Blue Turtles, on which it is the longest track. Its lyrics express the position of the British coal miners who had been on strike during the year prior to the album's release, addressed to the Conservative government of Prime Minister Margaret Thatcher. They tell of the miners' deep attachment to their work and its importance to the country's economy and culture, alluding to William Blake's poem "And did those feet in ancient time", while criticising Thatcher's economic policies, particularly the effort to shift from coal to nuclear power as Britain's primary source of energy.

Sting was moved to write the song by his own youth in Northumberland, outside Newcastle, where many communities depended economically on mining. He felt no one during the strike had made the case for continued coal use and the dangers posed by nuclear power. His father had worked in shipbuilding, another industry that had once dominated the British economy but had been diminishing in importance in the later 20th century. He drew the melody line from a song he had co-written and recorded as a member of the mid-1970s British jazz band Last Exit. It was released as a single in Germany, Australia and New Zealand; a live version was filmed the following year for Bring on the Night and its soundtrack album. Sting re-recorded it with a different arrangement in 1993 for Ten Summoner's Tales and then adapted it for symphony orchestra on 2010's Symphonicities.

Critics generally liked the song, at least musically. They have noted in particular how its insistent, repetitive synthesizer figure and unchanging backing percussion rhythm suggest a contrast between machinery and the humanity represented by Sting's vocal and Branford Marsalis's soprano saxophone fills. It also has been seen as an evolution in Sting's protest music, the first time he devoted a song to environmental issues. The lyrics drew a mixed reaction; scientists have criticised the song for its inaccurate statement that carbon-14 is dangerously radioactive, when in fact it is a widespread product of natural decay that is harmless in those quantities and instead used for carbon dating. Three decades after its release, Sting said he had revised his opinion of nuclear energy in response to climate change and now saw it more favourably.

== Economic, political and social context ==
When Margaret Thatcher became Prime Minister of the United Kingdom following the victory of her Conservative Party in the 1979 elections, one of her goals was to add to Britain's nuclear power generating capacity. She had been impressed by France's Messmer plan, enacted in response to the 1973 oil crisis. It had led to the construction of 58 new reactors in the late 1970s, making France less dependent on foreign oil imports and eliminating the use of coal, a result also achieved in neighbouring Belgium. Britain, by contrast, had pioneered the use of commercial nuclear power in the 1950s but since then had lagged behind, with its useful reactors ageing into obsolescence while newer projects like Dungeness B became national embarrassments as construction costs and delays escalated. A second oil shock later that year underscored the urgency. In October of that year, Secretary of State for Energy David Howell announced to Parliament the government's plan to add 15 gigawatts of nuclear generating capacity by building roughly one new reactor every year for 10 years. Thatcher echoed this announcement two months later with firmer details of a program.

The Tories also had a political reason to embrace nuclear power. Their previous government had been defeated in an election held during a wintertime strike by coal miners, who worked at the nationalised mines run by the National Coal Board (NCB). Two years earlier, Prime Minister Edward Heath's government had increased miners' pay after another miners' strike, and this time the government was less willing to negotiate, making the election a referendum on the strike under the slogan "Who governs Britain?". The electorate answered that challenge by returning the opposition Labour Party, more closely allied with the National Union of Miners (NUM), to power.

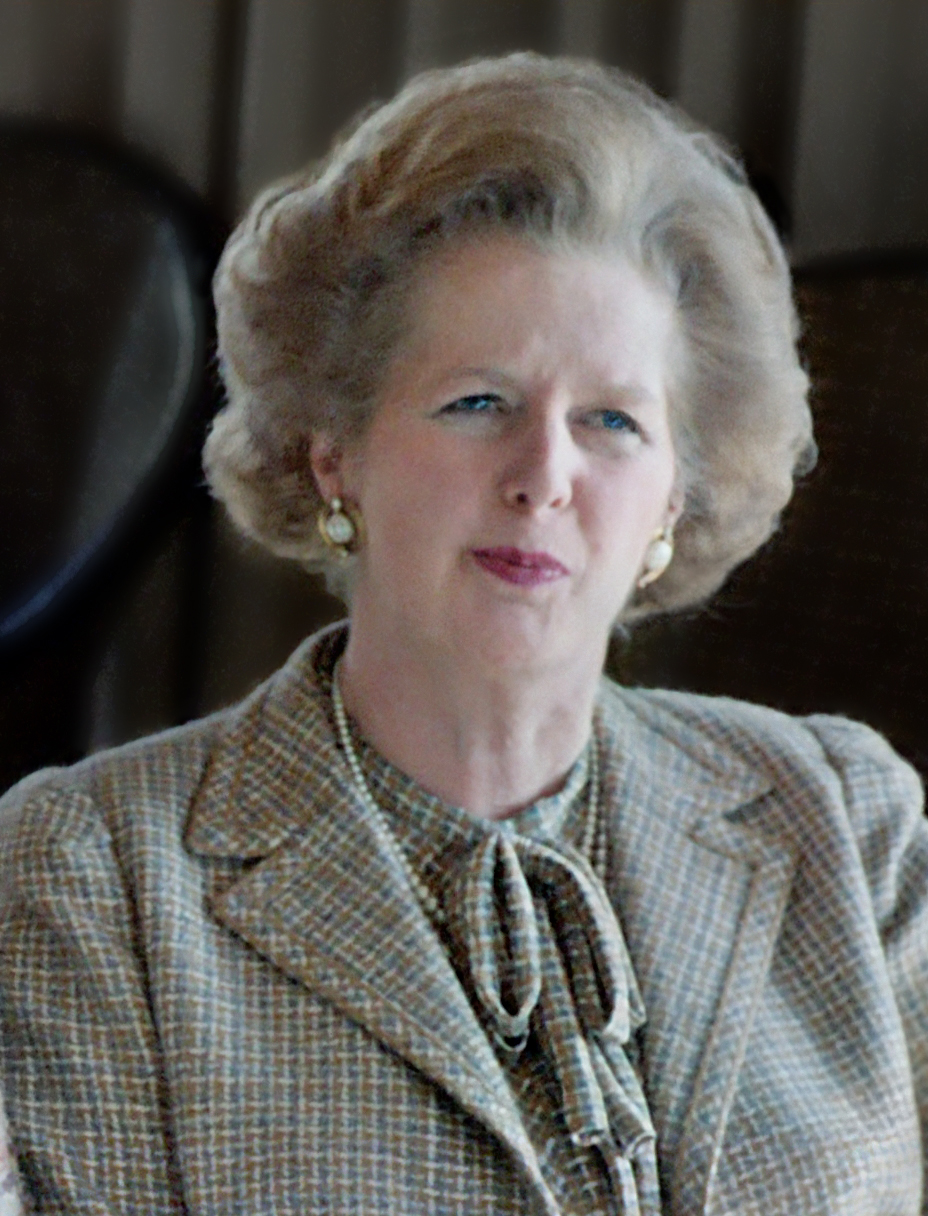
Margaret Thatcher in 1984

Many of the Conservatives who entered the party's leadership, including Thatcher, never forgot what they considered a humiliating defeat by NUM and Arthur Scargill, a regional union leader in Yorkshire where the largest group of miners were concentrated, whose use of mobile flying pickets had secured the union's victory. They credited public discontent with British unions fostered by the Winter of Discontent, several weeks of strikes by unions representing hauliers, garbage workers, gravediggers and other government workers aggravated by severe winter weather that combined to nearly paralyze the country, with their electoral victory. As a result, they broke with previous Conservative governments in embracing more explicitly libertarian free-market economic theories that became known as Thatcherism. One element was that unions could not be allowed to exercise such control over the British economy as they had been, or had been perceived as doing, under governments of both parties since World War II.

British coal mining, which had once powered the Industrial Revolution and made mine owners and operators wealthy at the expense of the miners who risked their lives doing dirty and dangerous work that had led to unionisation and widespread labour unrest earlier in the 20th century, had declined considerably by the early 1980s. The total number of miners had declined by 80 per cent from those earlier eras, many of the richer and more accessible coal seams had been depleted and only government subsidies kept mining profitable. Many pits remained open as Scargill and NUM had vowed to fight any closures for any reasons but safety.

In 1981, the government proposed closing 20 pits but backed down after union opposition and the threat of another strike. The following year, Scargill was elected NUM's president on the strength of his promise to oppose any closures unless the pit was unsafe or exhausted. The government responded in 1983 by appointing Sir Ian McGregor to head the NCB following his tenure at British Steel, where he had made redundant 95,000 jobs in the course of making it profitable enough to be privatised. He proposed closing the same 20 pits, which Scargill attacked as intended more to break the union than improve the NCB's books.

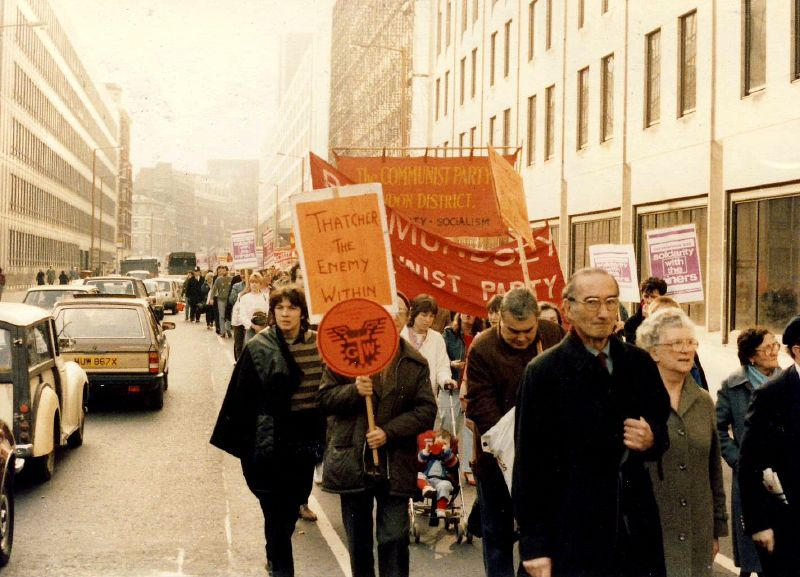
March in support of striking miners

Despite having dropped its planned closures in 1981 in the face of a strike threat, the government was actively preparing for the eventuality of another. Following the Ridley Plan, drawn up by Nicholas Ridley, another Conservative MP convinced that a Tory government had to win a national strike to control unions for the benefit of the economy, it had stockpiled coal at power stations and prepared to bring closed oil-fired plants back online. Nuclear power, though limited at the time, was part of the plan. Chancellor of the Exchequer Nigel Lawson, another strong Thatcherite, saw it as "the means of emancipation from Arthur Scargill."

In March 1984 miners at a South Yorkshire pit walked off the job over closures and called for a national strike, a call echoed by Scargill but not fully implemented by all regions due to the lack of a unionwide vote. Coal use declined by a third during the strike; nuclear power helped make up the difference. Almost a year later, the strike ended with the miners having gained nothing. Pit closures began soon afterwards.

== Composition ==
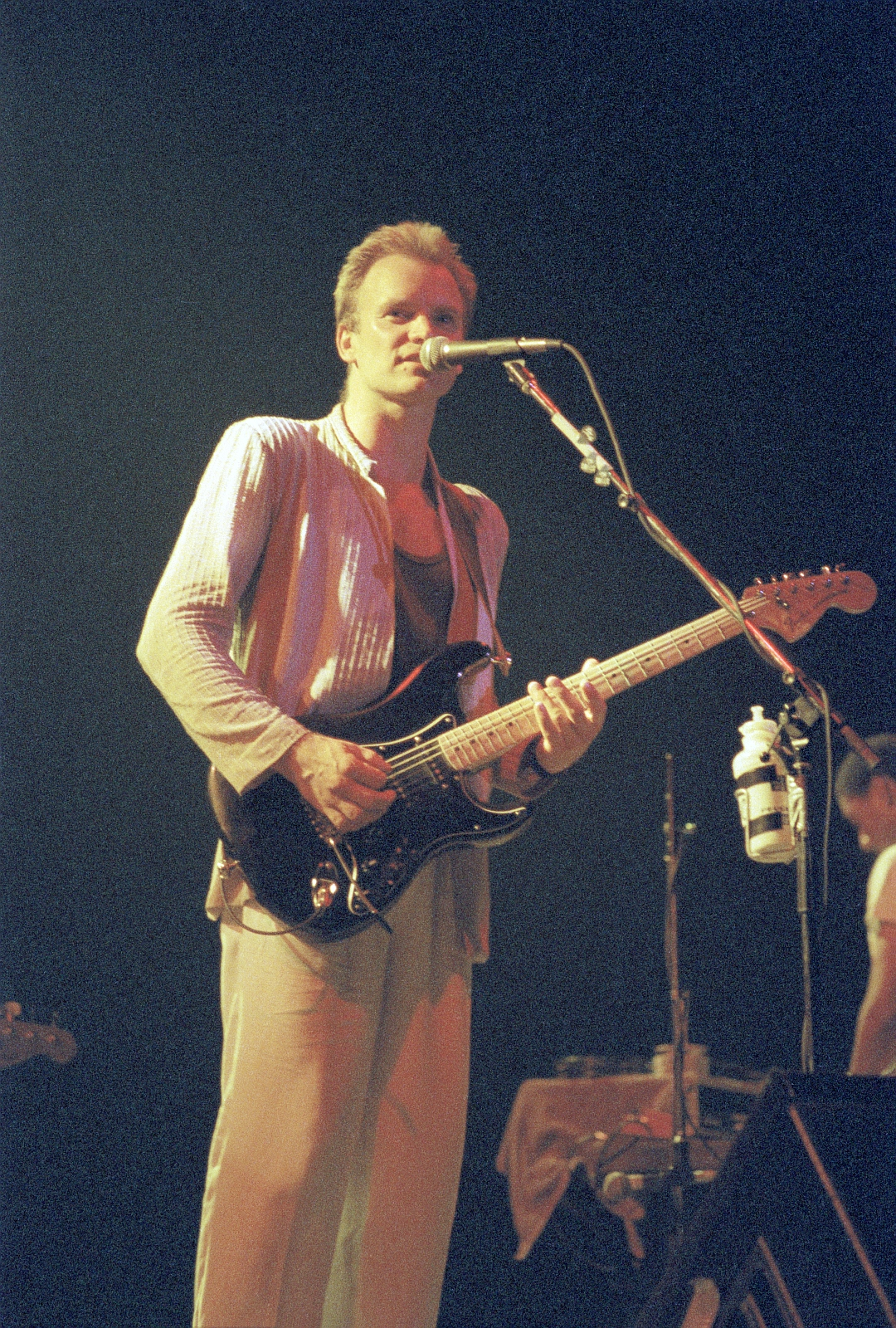
Sting in 1986

Sting combined a melody line from a song he had recorded a decade earlier with lyrics about the miners' strike, which was ongoing as he wrote, recorded and mixed the song for The Dream of the Blue Turtles' sessions at Blue Wave, Eddy Grant's studio in Barbados, and Le Studio in Quebec north of Montreal.

In a New Musical Express (NME) interview at the time of The Dream of the Blue Turtles was released, Sting discussed the background of the song. In his native Wallsend, outside the city of Newcastle in North East England, boys who did not finish grammar school had the choice of working at the Swan Hunter shipyard where his father had worked, or in the Rising Sun coal pit outside town, if they wanted to remain in the area and earn a living wage. Before his musical career, Sting taught in a Northumberland village where "all the children's fathers were miners. The area I was brought up in was literally built on coal."

By then, both the pit and the shipyard had been closed. "There are 300 years of coal supplies left, and they're closing all these pits", he lamented. "And I frankly think the government has got its head up its arse. They're destroying communities that are culturally very rich [and] offering them no alternative, saying you're completely useless."

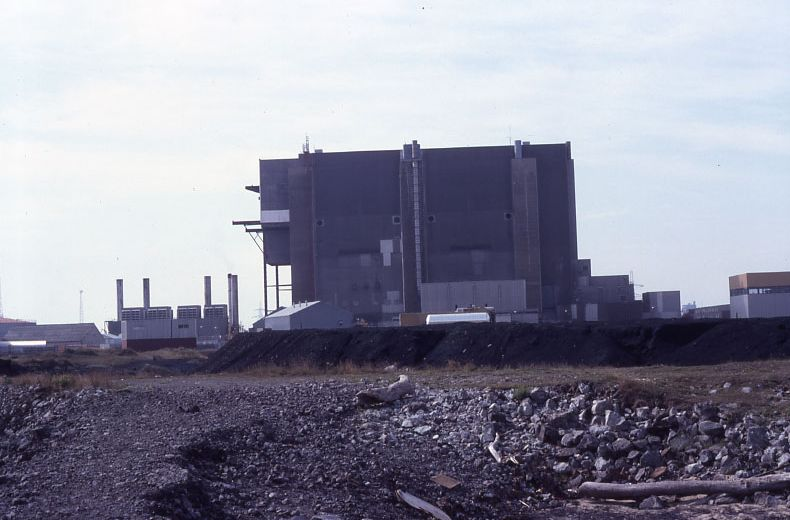
The Hartlepool nuclear reactor, during construction in 1983

Sting was also critical of the government's plan to replace coal with nuclear power, pointing to the Hartlepool nuclear plant outside Middlesbrough, south of Wallsend, which required uranium imports from South Africa to function. He had once supported nuclear power himself, but then said that he changed his mind when he learned more about it. "Those machines were turned on 20 years ago and they don't know how to turn them off. Now they're falling to bits and they don't know how to repair them. It's frightening." Sting also said friends who work in the nuclear industry "telephone me occasionally with horror stories about how dangerous and inept the whole system is."

"Also I felt that during the miners' strike", Sting continued, "the case for coal was never put to the nation. Kinnock (Note: Leader of the Opposition and the Labour Party during the strike) didn't explain it, Arthur Scargill didn't even address it, it was complete personality rhetoric with Thatcher. And the case for coal is really strong." Ultimately, he said:

'We Work The Black Seam' is about the dignity and heroism of being a coal miner. I think symbolically the miner in our society plays an important part, subconsciously. If you think about it in a symbolic way, the miner digs into the backbone of the country, and brings out power. There's something very noble in the image.

=== Music ===
External videos
- "We Work the Black Seam" at Sting's YouTube channel

"We Work the Black Seam" is in 4/4 at a tempo of 120 beats per minute, opening in the key of A minor. Initially it follows a chord progression of Am-C-Em^{7}, a i-III-v progression that alternates with Am-F-Dm^{7} (i-VI-iv), throughout the verse. At the chorus, the synthesizer changes to playing just the background chords as the song modulates to the key of F, with the progression F-C-D-a, repeated three times in full. On the fourth, the progression stops at D on the words "carbon fourteen", after which the bass and synthesizer play a scale descending from F to A, facilitating the return to A minor for the song's title to be sung twice before the next verse.

The song fades in with a repeating six-note keyboard figure in a vibraphone-like voice in open fourths and fifths, played on the downbeats, that critic Jon Pareles likened to "the clang of picks". Christopher Gable, author of The Words and Music of Sting, traces the use of the open fourths and fifths to English folk music. Behind it is a percussion track consisting of three eighth notes on a bass drum surrounding beat two and a snare hit on beat four, both of which remain consistent throughout the entire song. Gable sees this as, along with the song's fading in and then out and the end, suggesting a factory in continuous production, creating tension between the humanity of the melody and the rigid backing track that accentuates the theme of the lyrics. Paul Carr similarly notes this "appears to be deliberately 'industrial', automated, with a mechanised avoidance of feeling." He finds it complemented by the horns during the choruses, evoking the colliery bands in most British mining communities.

When the music reaches full volume, guitar, soprano saxophone and synthesizer fills enter. The saxophone's opening phrase, beginning on a rising fifth. During the chorus, the saxophone plays a countermelody setting up the descending scale that marks the return to A minor. Gable sees this as accentuating the chorus's expressed lyrical hopefulness that the miners' grievances with nuclear power will be better appreciated in the future. Afterwards, as the title is sung, it plays the same phrase as it does in the intro, marking a return to the present.

External videos
- "Savage Beast" as performed by Last Exit, with Sting on bass and vocals

The melody, which Pareles described as "winding ... suggest[ing] climbing and descending", (Note: In its last phrase it does, in fact, ascend and descend more than a full octave.) was described by Sting as "hav[ing] lain among my mental notes for perhaps ten years", in the liner notes to the soundtrack album for Bring on the Night, a 1986 documentary about the making of Turtles, in which the song is shown being recorded. While those notes imply he had never been able to use it, due to his inability to finish it or "find suitable lyrics", it was in fact the melody line of "Savage Beast", a song he had recorded in 1975 when part of the British jazz fusion band Last Exit.

Gable notes that the verse melody line, in the Dorian mode, (Note: Christopher Rait, in his dissertation on Sting's music, observes that although all seven notes of the mode are used in the melody, it reads more as pentatonic.) is additive: "Each phrase fragment builds upon the last, until the third and final phrase makes a grand arc from the tonic note 'a' up to a high 'b' and back down again." The chorus melody shows less variation, which to him accentuates the difference between the focus of the verse lyrics on the present and the chorus's turn to the future.

In his 2019 doctoral dissertation on Sting's music for Canada's York University, Christopher Rait finds "a number of appealing rhythmic devices" in "We Work the Black Seam", which he traces to swing influence. The opening instrumental melodies, stretching the intro's Aeolian mode intro with some extensions, introduce rhythmic dissonance with the underlying Charleston rhythm, their syncopation becoming hypersyncopation when the vocals enter.

=== Lyrics ===
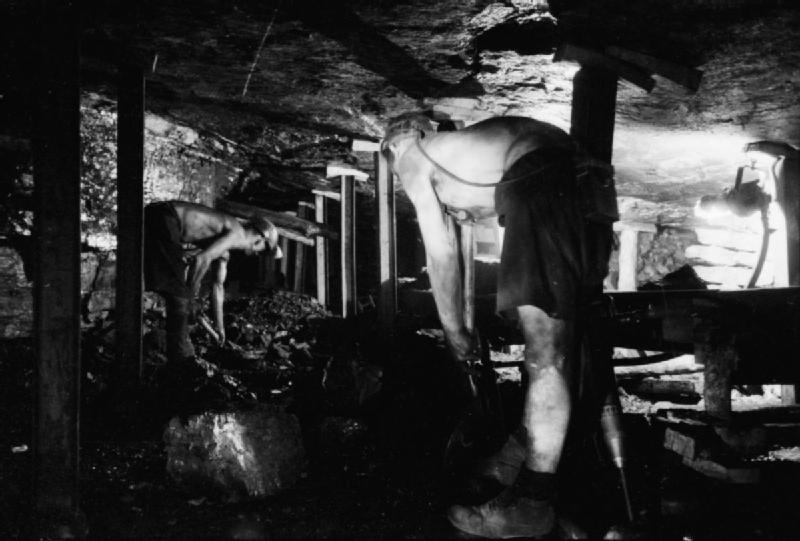
"We tunneled deep inside the nation's soul .."

The lyrics take the form of a dramatic monologue. The singer speaks on behalf, and as one, of the miners, always using "we" and addressing an unnamed person or persons. He tells them in the opening lines: "This place has changed for good / Your economic theory said it would / It's hard for us to understand / We can't give up our jobs the way we should". In the second verse, the singer alludes to the many accidents and deaths that have occurred in mines while the miners "tunneled deep inside the nation's soul" (and, later "walk through ancient forest lands (Note: Paul Carr sees in this line one of two allusions to Blake's "And did those feet in ancient time", subtler than the "dark satanic mills" the song later mentions.) / And light a thousand cities with our hands"). This impact cannot be measured monetarily, and so "your economic theory makes no sense." These lines have been taken as an attack on Thatcherism.

In the chorus, which makes its first appearance after the second verse, the song raises the nuclear issue; Paul Carr notes a change in tone that suggests the chorus is addressed to the miners alone. The singer hopes that in a future "nuclear age / They may understand our rage". He alludes to the maintenance difficulties Sting told the NME of having heard about from his friends, and then the government's reasons for phasing out coal in favour of nuclear energy:

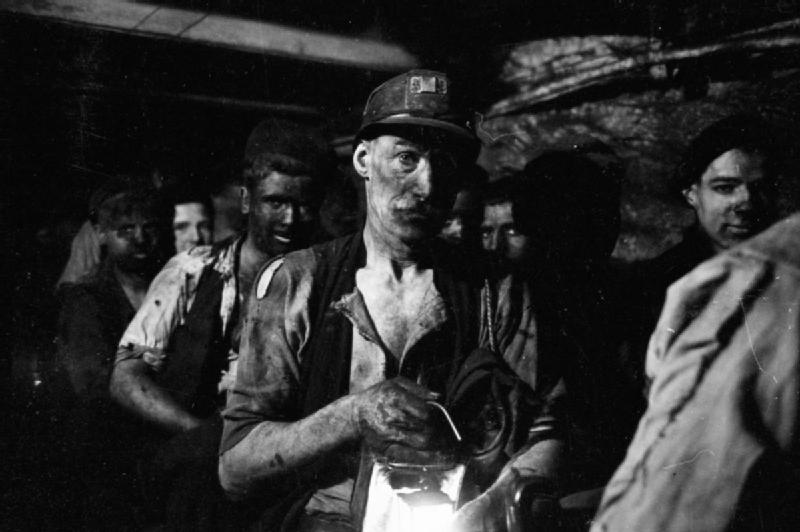
"Grimy faces were never seen ..."

Power was to become cheap and clean
Grimy faces were never seen
But deadly for twelve thousand years
Is carbon fourteen

The next verse alludes to "And did those feet in ancient time", an early 19th-century poem by William Blake that a young Sting would likely have studied in grammar school, later adapted into the Anglican hymn, "Jerusalem", in describing the nuclear plants as "dark satanic mills [that] have made redundant all our mining skills". It concludes with a warning that "all the poisoned streams in Cumberland" (Note: The 1957 Windscale fire, Britain's worst nuclear accident, scattered radioactive discharge around a large portion of Cumberland, in North West England, requiring that all milk from area cows be discarded for the next month. The British government minimised the extent of the disaster at the time and for many years after; in 1983 a Yorkshire TV documentary on the disaster, drawing on newly available information, alleged that a high incidence of childhood leukaemia in the area was possibly the result of lingering background radiation from the disaster. Sting refers to this latter claim in his NME interview.) are too high a price to pay for abandoning coal.

=== Recording ===
"We Work the Black Seam" was one of the last tracks on the album to be recorded at Eddy Grant's Blue Wave Studios in Barbados before those sessions concluded in March 1985. Afterwards he took the master tapes to New York to share with executives at A&M Records, his label, and then went to Le Studio, in Morin-Heights, Quebec, Canada, north of Montreal, to mix the album. Sting produced the track himself along with Pete Smith.

== Releases ==
"We Work the Black Seam" was the first track on the second side of the vinyl and cassette release of The Dream of the Blue Turtles, released in June 1985, and the sixth out of 10 tracks overall, between "Shadows in the Rain" and "Consider Me Gone". At 5 minutes and 42 seconds long, it is the album's longest track.

It was released as a single in Australia, Germany and New Zealand a year after the album, the sixth single from it in those countries. "The Dream of the Blue Turtles", the album's title track and its shortest track, was the B-side.

=== Other versions ===
In late 1985, Sting and the jazz musicians he had recorded The Dream of the Blue Turtles with gathered in Paris to rehearse for a short European tour. They performed at several venues in the French capital; filmmaker Michael Apted made a documentary, Bring on the Night of the rehearsals and shows. Sting and backing vocalists Janice Pendarvis and Dolette McDonald are shown rehearsing their parts on "We Work the Black Seam" in which they sing the title lines, accompanied by a drum machine and synthesizer playing all the musical parts. The scene segues into a performance of the song with the band at Palais Omnisports de Paris-Bercy with an arrangement similar to the recorded version save for the backing vocals; saxophonist Branford Marsalis is applauded after playing the melody line as a solo. The performance shown in the film is also included on the soundtrack album, where it runs to nearly 7 minutes.

External videos
- "We Work the Black Seam (1993)" at Sting's YouTube channel

Eight years later, in 1993, Sting re-recorded "We Work the Black Seam", with Hugh Padgham co-producing, during sessions for his album Ten Summoner's Tales. He chose not to include it on the album, and it was instead released on two different singles: the US CD single of "If I Ever Lose My Faith in You", as "We Work the Black Seam (1993)" and as the B-side to the UK 7-inch release of "Fields of Gold". The latter release omitted the parenthetical from the title.

Symphonicities

On his 2010 album Symphonicities, Sting sang over orchestral arrangements of his songs performed by the Royal Philharmonic Orchestra, following a tour where the two had performed together. Among them was "We Work the Black Seam". The arrangement, the longest version of the song on record at 7:18, features more brass than the other songs on the album, and is primarily built around the melody line, with the saxophone fills and backing line of the original heard at times. Sting also changed some of the lyrics.

== Music video ==
A video was filmed to accompany the song's release in Germany. In it, Sting stands in a mansion's ballroom amid furniture and mannequins, covered in plastic wrap, singing the song.

== Reception ==
=== Upon release ===
Critics reviewing the album took note of "We Work the Black Seam". Most found the music praiseworthy. "The sounds of delicately malletted percussion, organ and light saxophone licks lend [it] a hymnlike ethereality", wrote Stephen Holden in The New York Times. "The arrangement also illuminates the song's deeper contemplation of power hidden in the earth and its comparisons between the irresponsible exploitation of human labor and of natural resources." In Rolling Stone, Pareles singled out the song's "transparency". Billboard called it "ambitious ... the work of an original artist". The Los Angeles Times labelled the song as "an extraordinary ballad ... which builds on a minimal five-note figure and [Branford] Marsalis' atonal accents". The Miami Herald's Tom Moon called the song's "shrill, almost panicked chorus" one of the album's "moments of ecstatic music". Contrarily, Richard Williams in The Times complained that the song "lacks the mysterious dimension that turns propaganda into art."

The song's lyrics drew a more mixed reaction. Richard Harrington, reviewing a Sting concert in The Washington Post, commented that the "Black Seam" of the song's title "could also stand as a metaphor for Sting's longtime passion for various Afro-American and Caribbean styles." Pareles found the "neat denunciations of Thatcherism" in the first verse offset by the "goofy stuff about the universe" in the later lyrics, and advised listeners to "dump the lyric sheet". He also implied that Sting's concern about the long-term effects of carbon-14 in the chorus resulted from it rhyming where plutonium does not. Other writers have taken note of this scientific inaccuracy, as carbon-14, while radioactive, is a common naturally occurring isotope that accumulates in the human body as well as the environment and, at an approximately 0.01 mSv/year dose per person, (Note: A person constantly exposed to carbon-14 for 12,000 years would thus receive a 120 mSv total dose) does not pose any health threat, (Note: The half-life of carbon-14 is also actually less than 6,000 years.) while allowing for his broader point that nuclear waste remains radioactive and hazardous for very long periods of time.

=== Later years ===
Critics and scholars looking back on "We Work the Black Seam" in later years have seen it as a significant step in Sting's development as a writer and performer of protest music. He had begun writing such songs with "Driven to Tears" on the 1980 Police album Zenyatta Mondatta, and continued with some more on the band's next album, Ghost in the Machine, but largely eschewed them on Synchronicity, the last Police album. Gable notes that "We Work the Black Seam" is Sting's first protest song built around environmentalist themes, a cause he would become more strongly associated with later in his solo career, particularly protection of the world's rainforests.

Sting's perspective on the merits of coal over nuclear power changed with time. Commenting on the lyrics in 2009, he wrote, "Neither source of power is ideal, but that would be another song." Seven years later, in an interview with Rolling Stone, he said that climate change had led him to reassess that point of view even further. "If we're going to tackle global warming, I think nuclear power is the only way you can create massive amounts of power."

Since 1985, the UK has greatly reduced its use of coal-fired power. By 2017 only 10 pits remained open and coal accounted for only 2 per cent of the electricity generated; the country has increasingly gone for periods of days at a time without having to burn any coal. The government originally planned to phase it out completely by 2025, but Energy and Climate Change Minister Anne-Marie Trevelyan announced in June 2021 that the deadline to phase out coal would occur one year earlier than planned. While nuclear accounts for 20 per cent of British power, only one of the ten reactors Thatcher called for was ever built, and all the other reactors will have to be retired by 2030. The difference has been made up for by the "dash for gas" from the North Sea following the privatisation of Britain's electric grid in the years after the miners' strike; gas turned out to be cheaper and cleaner than coal.

== Cover versions ==
The British folk group Swan Arcade has recorded an a cappella cover version, under the name "Black Seam". Irish group Lankum include a verse of the song on their album Live in Dublin at the end of track 4, "The Pride of Petravore".

== Personnel ==
- Sting – vocals, guitars
- Darryl Jones – bass guitar
- Kenny Kirkland – keyboards
- Branford Marsalis – soprano saxophone
- Omar Hakim – drums

== See also ==
- The Last Nightingale, album recorded to benefit striking miners
- "Red Hill Mining Town", 1987 U2 song about the effect of the strike on small mining communities
- Sting discography
