= Between the Earth and Sky =

Between the Earth and Sky may refer to:

- Between the Earth and Sky (Lankum album), 2017
- Between the Earth & Sky (Luba album), 1986
