= Prince Robert =

Traditional song

"Prince Robert" (Roud 55, Child 87), also known as "Lord Abore and Mary Flynn" or "Harry Saunders", is a traditional English-language murder ballad, likely originating in Scotland.

== Synopsis ==
Prince (or Earl or Lord) Robert married against his mother's wishes and went to beg her blessing. She prepared a wine cup with poison, put it to her lips without drinking, and gave it to her son. He died. The bride was summoned on the pretext of a meal and told the news, and that she will get nothing of his property. She wants none of his property but the ring on his finger that was promised to her, but even that is denied her. She dies, and they are buried together.

== Motifs ==
Francis James Child noted that other ballads included a mother who poisoned her son over a match, but considered none to compare to this one.

Willie's Lady also revolves about the mother's hostility.

The poisoner who feigns drinking her own poison is also found in the Scottish fairy tale Gold-Tree and Silver-Tree.

== Traditional recordings ==
Only two traditional recordings of the ballad have been recorded, both collected by Tom Munelly on separate occasions in 1970 in Co. Dublin, Ireland. One was performer was Jim Kelly and the other was Frank Feeney, although it seems that Kelly learnt his version from Feeney.

== Modern recordings ==
- Peggy Seeger, No Tyme Lyke the Present (1976)
- Jackie Oates, Jackie Oats (2006)
- Ewan McLennan, Stories Still Untold (2014)
- Lankum, False Lankum (2023)
- Caladh Nua, Free and Easy (2016)
