= Last Exit (British band) =

English jazz fusion band

Last Exit were an English jazz fusion band formed in Newcastle upon Tyne, England, in 1974. It is best remembered as the group Sting was in before finding stardom with The Police.

== Band history ==
Keyboardist Gerry Richardson and bassist Gordon Sumner, later famous as Sting, originally were members of the Newcastle Big Band. Frustrated by the band's lack of ambition and conservative repertoire, and influenced by more modern jazz ensembles like Weather Report and Return to Forever, they decided to form their own group. The band's name came from Hubert Selby Jr.'s novel Last Exit to Brooklyn. The original line-up included Sting, Richardson, drummer Ronnie Pearson, and guitarist John Hedley (later replaced by Terry Ellis).

The band was locally successful around Newcastle for several years. They released a single in 1975, "Whispering Voices/Evensong" (two Richardson compositions) on the Wudwink label, and later a full-length album on cassette tape called First from Last Exit featuring nine original songs.

In 1976, Carol Wilson, head of Richard Branson's music publishing company, saw Last Exit play in the Gosforth Hotel in Newcastle and signed them to a contract. Virgin financed the recording of a demo in the Pathway Studios in London. Wilson organised a number of gigs, including Dingwalls, and a double-page feature in Sounds and played the demo to every major record label. Most A&R agents thought highly of the music, but also could not see an obvious category to market the band so no record deal materialised.

In 1977, Last Exit moved to London but after a few gigs, half of the band returned to Newcastle, and Sting and Richardson started looking for other jobs. Richardson worked with Billy Ocean's band as musical director, while Sting joined Stewart Copeland and Henri Padovani and formed The Police.

=== Afterwards ===
Several Last Exit songs were later reworked by Sting, either with The Police or for his solo albums:

- "Night at the Grand Hotel" was performed by The Police in their early incarnation in 1977 but never recorded.
- "I Burn for You", "The Bed's Too Big Without You", and "Oh My God" were recorded by The Police under the same titles, the first being on the Brimstone & Treacle soundtrack, the second on Reggatta de Blanc, and the third on Synchronicity.
- "Carrion Prince", "Truth Kills", and "Savage Beast" are early incarnations of "Bring on the Night" (from Reggatta de Blanc), "Truth Hits Everybody" (from Outlandos d'Amour), and "We Work the Black Seam" (from The Dream of the Blue Turtles) respectively.
- The lyrics of "Fool in Love" were reused in The Police song "So Lonely" (from Outlandos d'Amour).

The songs "Don't Give Up Your Daytime Job" and "Don't You Look at Me" were considered for The Police album Ghost in the Machine, but were not used. They are, however, available as demos on several bootlegs.

In 1996, Sting invited Gerry Richardson to play organ on his album Mercury Falling.

In 2003, Richardson formed a band called The Big Idea, with Garry Linsley on sax and Paul Smith on drums. Sting sang as guest vocalist a rendition of Graham Bond's "Springtime in the City" on the band's second album, This ... Is What We Do (2010).

== Band members ==
- Terry Ellis – guitar
- John Hedley – guitar
- Ronnie Pearson – drums
- Gerry Richardson – keyboards
- Sting – bass, vocals
- David Blackwell – bass

== Discography ==
- First from Last Exit (1975) (cassette album)
- "Whispering Voices/Evensong" (1975) (single)

== Bibliography ==
- Sting, Broken Music, Simon & Schuster, 2003, ISBN 0-7434-5081-7.
