= Live in Dublin (Lankum album) =

Live album by Lankum
- Released: 21 June 2024
- Recorded: Vicar Street, Dublin
- Genre: Folk
- Length: 65:26
- Label: Rough Trade
- Producer: John Murphy; Lankum

Lankum chronology
False Lankum (2023)	Live in Dublin (2024)

Live in Dublin is the first live album by Irish folk music group Lankum, released on 21 June 2024 through Rough Trade Records.

The album contains the first official release of the song "The Rocky Road to Dublin".

== Critical reception ==
It was featured as Live Album of the Week by The Quietus, and described as "an out of world experience" by the Financial Times. Hot Press described it as "A trad panacea for weary hearts" and gave it a score of 9.5/10.

== Track listing ==
Live in Dublin track listing
No.	Title	Length
1.	"The Wild Rover"	11:08
2.	"The Young People"	6:43
3.	"The Rocky Road to Dublin"	4:16
4.	"The Pride of Petravore"	7:16
5.	"On a Monday Morning"	7:00
6.	"Go Dig My Grave"	11:51
7.	"Hunting the Wren"	6:43
8.	"Fugue"	3:02
9.	"Bear Creek"	7:27
Total length:		65:26

Track 4 concludes with a verse of Sting's song "We Work the Black Seam".

== Charts ==
Chart performance for Live in Dublin
Chart (2024)	Peak position
Irish Albums (OCC)	46
Scottish Albums (OCC)	87
UK Album Downloads (OCC)	14
UK Independent Albums (OCC)	14
