= Russians (song) =

1985 song by Sting

- UK 7-inch vinyl picture sleeve

Single by Sting

from the album The Dream of the Blue Turtles
- B-side: "Gabriel's Message"
- Released: 29 November 1985
- Recorded: 1985
- Genre: Pop; sound collage
- Length: 3:58
- Label: A&M
- Songwriters: Sting; Sergei Prokofiev
- Producers: Sting; Peter Smith

Sting singles chronology
"Fortress Around Your Heart" (1985)	"Russians" (1985)	"Moon over Bourbon Street" (1986)

Music video
- "Russians" on YouTube

"Russians" is a song by Sting, from his debut solo album, The Dream of the Blue Turtles, released in June 1985, and released as a single in November. The song is a commentary and plea that criticises the then-dominant Cold War foreign policy and doctrine of mutual assured destruction (MAD) by the United States and the then-existing Soviet Union.

== Background ==
In 2010, Sting explained that the song was inspired by watching Soviet TV via inventor Ken Schaffer's satellite receiver at Columbia University:

I had a friend at university who invented a way to steal the satellite signal from Russian TV. We'd have a few beers and climb this tiny staircase to watch Russian television... At that time of night we'd only get children's Russian television, like their "Sesame Street". I was impressed with the care and attention they gave to their children's programmes. I regret our current enemies haven't got the same ethics.

Sting performed the song at the 1986 Grammy Awards. His performance of the song was released on the 1994 album Grammy's Greatest Moments Volume 1.

== Music video ==
The accompanying music video for the single was directed by Jean-Baptiste Mondino, and was shot in a similar black-and-white, French New Wave-influenced style to his previous video for Don Henley's "The Boys of Summer". The video also prominently featured child actor Felix Howard, who was later featured in Mondino's promotional video for Madonna's "Open Your Heart" in 1986.

== Composition ==
The song uses the Romance theme from the Lieutenant Kijé Suite by Russian composer Sergei Prokofiev, and its lead-in includes a snippet from the Soviet news program Vremya in which the famed Soviet news broadcaster Igor Kirillov says in Russian: "...The British Prime Minister described the talks with the head of the delegation, Mikhail Sergeyevich Gorbachev, as a constructive, realistic, practical and friendly exchange of opinions...", referring to the meeting of Mikhail Gorbachev and Margaret Thatcher in 1984. The Soviet leader at the time was Konstantin Chernenko.

Also in the background, communications from the Apollo–Soyuz mission can be heard.

== Reception ==
Cash Box said it "features a haunting melody, dramatic lyric and sensational musicianship." Billboard called it a "a sober political/humanitarian message framed in surging chords and Prokofiev quotes." Colin Irwin of Melody Maker said, "Excellent lyric on a poignant, hopeful song preaching tolerance, has such a pretty tune it sounds positively twee."

== Legacy ==
In a 2021 interview, James Cameron, the co-writer, director and producer of Terminator 2, said that the song inspired him to create the character of John Connor, the 10-year-old boy who would be the central character of the plot: "I remember sitting there once, high on E, writing notes for Terminator, and I was struck by Sting's song, that 'I hope the Russians love their children too.' And I thought, 'You know what? The idea of a nuclear war is just so antithetical to life itself.' That's where the kid came from."

The song also inspired Christopher Nolan in the making of Oppenheimer.

Sting re-recorded an acoustic version of the song in March 2022, during the 2022 Russian invasion of Ukraine, with proceeds going to humanitarian and medical aid in Ukraine. In a statement, he said that he "never thought [the song] would be relevant again. But, in the light of one man’s bloody and woefully misguided decision to invade a peaceful, unthreatening neighbor, the song is, once again, a plea for our common humanity."

"Russians" was covered by Jonathan Hay and released as a techno version on his SoundCloud.

== Track listings ==
7″ single

1. "Russians" – 3:57
2. "Gabriel's Message" – 2:15

12″ maxi

1. "Russians" – 3:57
2. "Gabriel's Message" – 2:10
3. "I Burn for You" (live) – 4:40

== Personnel ==
- Photography by Anton Corbijn
- Made in West Germany by Polygram

"Russians"

- Written by Sting
- Engineered by Jim Scott
- Produced by Pete Smith

"Gabriel's Message"

- Written by Traditional
- Arranged by Sting
- Mixed and recorded by Pete Smith

"I Burn for You"

- Written by Sting
- Mixed, recorded and produced by Pete Smith

== Charts ==
=== Weekly charts ===
Chart (1985–1986)	Peak position
Australia (Kent Music Report)	11
Belgium (Ultratop 50 Flanders)	7
Canada Top Singles (RPM)	35
Canada Adult Contemporary (RPM)	13
Europe (European Hot 100 Singles)	1
France (SNEP)	2
Ireland (IRMA)	11
Israel (IBA)	1
Italy (Musica e dischi)	1
Netherlands (Dutch Top 40)	7
Netherlands (Single Top 100)	8
New Zealand (Recorded Music NZ)	25
Sweden (Sverigetopplistan)	16
Switzerland (Schweizer Hitparade)	13
UK Singles (Official Charts)	12
UK Airplay (Music & Media)	16
US Billboard Hot 100	16
US Mainstream Rock (Billboard)	34
West Germany (GfK)	4

=== Year-end charts ===
Chart (1986)	Position
Australia (Kent Music Report)	53
Belgium (Ultratop)	91
Europe (European Hot 100 Singles)	14
West Germany (Media Control)	50

== Certifications ==
Region	Certification	Certified units/sales
France (SNEP)	Gold	500,000^{*}
^{*} Sales figures based on certification alone.

== See also ==
- Do the Russians Want War?
- Music and politics
- Nuclear strategy
- Ronald Reagan in music
- American University speech
