= The Livelong Day =

Studio album by Lankum
- Released: 25 October 2019
- Genre: Folk
- Length: 56:40
- Label: Rough Trade
- Producer: John Murphy; Lankum

Lankum chronology
Between the Earth and Sky (2017)	The Livelong Day (2019)	False Lankum (2023)

The Livelong Day is the third studio album by Irish folk music group Lankum, released on 25 October 2019 through Rough Trade Records. It received positive reviews from critics and peaked at number eight on the Irish Albums Chart. The album won the RTÉ Choice Music Prize for Irish Album of the Year 2019.

== Critical reception ==
Professional ratings
Aggregate scores
Source	Rating
Metacritic	94/100
Review scores
Source	Rating
AllMusic	4.5/5 stars
The Guardian	5/5 stars
Hot Press	10/10
The Irish Times	5/5 stars

The Livelong Day received a score of 94 out of 100 on review aggregator Metacritic based on five critics' reviews, indicating "universal acclaim". Q called it a "frequently unsettling listen, but never a joyless one", with Uncut also describing it as "dark, powerful and disquieting stuff that resonates long after its final note has subsided". Mojo felt that Lankum "approach the tradition with an awe and wonder that especially percolates into the instrumentals", calling the album "their most extreme statement yet".

AllMusic's Timothy Monger wrote that "with a sizzling intensity that feels almost menacing, Lankum draw deeply from the well of Ireland's ancient music, transporting both familiar and long-forgotten tunes to surreal new heights while adding a handful of worthy originals to the canon", finding that the album's "dark majesty is well worth the engagement". The Guardian's Jude Rogers remarked that "nothing less than a thorough exploration and devastation of folk's most conventional tropes is Lankum's impressive game" and how the band "redirect well-known folk songs is worth staying for".

Lucy O'Toole of Hot Press found that aside from the dark moments, there is "a deep, resounding love encased within the music throughout the album – with Radie Peat’s tenderly earthy vocals embodying the Irish landscape and people to stunning effect". The Irish Times's Siobhán Long stated that "fierce and fragile, this collection of eight songs clocks in at a hefty 56 minutes. Just shy of an hour of visceral music, this chillingly cohesive album is built on a wall of sound that rattles as many assumptions about what traditional and folk music can and might be as Phil Spector did in the 1960s".

== Track listing ==
The Livelong Day track listing
No.	Title	Length
1.	"The Wild Rover"	10:14
2.	"The Young People"	7:02
3.	"Ode to Lullaby"	4:51
4.	"Bear Creek"	5:31
5.	"Katie Cruel"	9:17
6.	"The Dark Eyed Gypsy"	7:38
7.	"The Pride of Petravore"	4:56
8.	"Hunting the Wren"	7:11
Total length:		56:40

== Charts ==
Chart performance for The Livelong Day
Chart (2019)	Peak position
Irish Albums (IRMA)	8
Scottish Albums (OCC)	35
UK Album Downloads (OCC)	88
UK Independent Albums (OCC)	11
