= Fortress Around Your Heart =

- UK 12-inch vinyl single

Single by Sting

from the album The Dream of the Blue Turtles
- B-side: Shadows in the Rain (Europe); Consider Me Gone (live) (USA)
- Released: August 1985 (US); 4 October 1985 (UK)
- Genre: Sophisti-pop; rock; new wave
- Length: 4:48
- Label: A&M
- Songwriter: Sting
- Producers: Sting; Peter Smith

Sting singles chronology
"Love Is the Seventh Wave" (1985)	"Fortress Around Your Heart" (1985)	"Russians" (1985)

Music video
- "Sting - Fortress Around Your Heart (Option Two)" on YouTube

"Fortress Around Your Heart" is a single released from Sting's 1985 debut solo studio album The Dream of the Blue Turtles. It was released as the album's second single in the US and the third single in the UK, where it peaked at No. 8 and No. 49. The song also reached No. 1 for two weeks on the US Billboard Top Rock Tracks chart, becoming his second consecutive #1 hit on this chart.

The song was later included on the U.S. release of the Fields of Gold: The Best of Sting 1984–1994 compilation album.

== Background ==
Sting wrote "Fortress Around Your Heart" in a Barbados recording studio in 1985. He had been working with modal chords on a guitar, which he thought sounded "kind of medieval". He then wrote lyrics referencing sieges, castle walls, and armies as a metaphor for a struggling romantic relationship. In a Musician magazine interview later that year, Sting said:

"Fortress" is about appeasement, about trying to bridge the gaps between individuals. The central image is a minefield that you've laid around this other person to try and protect them. Then you realize that you have to walk back through it. I think it's one of the best choruses I've ever written.

During one of Sting's first performances of the song in concert in Paris, his crew lowered a tiny fortress onto the stage in a parody of the similar Stonehenge scene from the film This Is Spinal Tap.

== Reception ==
Billboard said that the single is "challenging, complex and rather difficult," with "mysterious poetic imagery" and a melody that is "more recitative than hook." Cash Box said that the song illustrated Sting's "genius as songwriter," although it is "tinged with melancholy" and "less jazzy and more Police-like than Sting's previous US single, "If You Love Somebody Set Them Free."

== Charts ==
=== Weekly charts ===
Chart (1985)	Peak position
Australia (Kent Music Report)	72
Belgium (Ultratop 50 Flanders)	40
Canada Top Singles (RPM)	20
Israel (IBA)	8
Netherlands (Single Top 100)	26
New Zealand (Recorded Music NZ)	13
UK Singles (Official Charts)	49
US Billboard Hot 100	8
US Mainstream Rock (Billboard)	1
US Adult Contemporary (Billboard)	32

=== Year-end ===
Year-end chart (1985)	Rank
US Top Pop Singles (Billboard)	95
