= Moon over Bourbon Street =

Single by Sting

from the album The Dream of the Blue Turtles
- B-side: "The Ballad of Mack the Knife"
- Released: 7 February 1986
- Genre: Pop rock, jazz
- Length: 3:39
- Label: A&M
- Songwriter: Sting
- Producers: Sting and Peter Smith

Sting singles chronology
"Russians" (1985)	"Moon over Bourbon Street" (1986)	"We Work the Black Seam" (1986)

"Moon over Bourbon Street" is the fifth single from Sting's solo debut album The Dream of the Blue Turtles. The single peaked at No. 44 on the UK singles chart and the title of the song references the historic French Quarter of New Orleans route of Bourbon Street.

== Background ==
Sting composed the song in New Orleans and said that it was inspired by Anne Rice's gothic noir novel Interview with the Vampire. He mentioned that "[this is] a beautiful book about this vampire which is a vampire by accident. He's immortal and he has to kill people to live, but he's been left with his conscience intact. He's this wonderful, poignant soul who has to do evil, yet wants to stop. Once again, it's the duality which interested me." He also said that although it was inspired by the Rice novel that "there was one moonlit night in the French Quarter of New Orleans where I had the distinct impression that I was being followed."

Sting plays double bass on the song.

In 2003, Sting re-recorded the song as a B-side on the single "Send Your Love", which peaked at No. 30 on the UK music charts.

== Charts ==
Chart (1986)	Peak position
UK Singles (OCC)	44
