= Love Is the Seventh Wave =

Single by Sting

from the album The Dream of the Blue Turtles
- B-side: Consider Me Gone (live) (Europe); Fortress Around Your Heart / Dream of the Blue Turtles (USA)
- Released: 9 August 1985 (UK)
- Genre: Calypso
- Length: 3:30
- Label: A&M
- Songwriter: Sting
- Producers: Sting and Peter Smith

Sting singles chronology
"If You Love Somebody Set Them Free" (1985)	"Love Is the Seventh Wave" (1985)	"Fortress Around Your Heart" (1985)

Music video
- Love Is The Seventh Wave on YouTube

"Love Is the Seventh Wave" is a hit single from Sting's 1985 solo debut album The Dream of the Blue Turtles. It was released as the album's second single in the UK, and the third single in the US.

== Song information ==
The song concludes with a brief, self-mocking reference to Sting's biggest hit song with The Police, "Every Breath You Take". As Sting explained: "At the end I sing, 'Every cake you bake, every leg you break'. I quite like using the songs as a modular system where you can mix and match lines from different songs. It's a tradition now".

== Reception ==
Cash Box said that "the lilting rhythmic push and tropical melodic line...recalls Police-like efforts, but Branford Marsalis’ soprano sax coloring and the overall blending of instruments make this another appealing Sting solo success." Billboard said that it integrates "reggae influence" with "jazz chops."

== Music video ==
The music video portrays Sting as a primary school teacher (his day job prior to pursuing a music career), who performs amidst his students' artwork.

The artwork was supplied by students at Latchmere Junior School, Kingston-upon-Thames, in the United Kingdom.

== Single release ==
The single contains a different mix of the song from the album. It also features a live version of "Consider Me Gone", which was recorded at the Mogador Theatre in Paris in May 1985.

== Track listings ==
7" US single (AM-2787)

1. "Love Is the Seventh Wave" (Single Version) – 3:45
2. "The Dream of the Blue Turtles" – 1:15

12" UK single (AMY 272)

1. "Love Is the Seventh Wave" (New Mix) – 4:05
2. "Consider Me Gone" (Live) – 4:45

12" US single (SP-12153)

1. "Love Is the Seventh Wave" (New Mix) – 4:05
2. "Fortress Around your heart" (Album Version) – 4:48
3. "Dream of the blue turtles" – 1:15

== Charts ==
Chart (1985)	Peak position
Australia (Kent Music Report)	57
Belgium (Ultratop 50 Flanders)	19
Canada Top Singles (RPM)	38
France (SNEP)	30
Ireland (IRMA)	25
Israel (IBA)	9
Netherlands (Dutch Top 40)	7
Netherlands (Single Top 100)	10
New Zealand (Recorded Music NZ)	17
UK Singles (Official Charts)	41
UK Airplay (Music & Media)	20
US Billboard Hot 100	17
