= Hunting the Wren =

Hunting the Wren may refer to:

- Cutty Wren (or its variants like The Hunting of the Wren) a traditional English folk song;
- Wren Day, also known as Wren's Day, Hunt the Wren Day or The Hunting of the Wrens, celebrated on 26 December in Ireland, the Isle of Man, Wales and Newfoundland and Labrador.
