= Paul Carr (musician) =

English guitarist

Paul Carr is an English guitarist who first emerged during the mid to late 1980s as a member of the James Taylor Quartet. Prior to this he worked as a London-based freelance musician, mainly on the London jazz scene.

After studying popular music in the early 1980s at Newcastle College, Carr continued to undertake a teaching degree at Middlesex University, followed by a PhD under the supervision of British composer Gavin Bryars.

Since the early 1990s, Carr has been more involved in popular music education. He is currently head of The University of Glamorgan's Music Academy, in Cardiff, Wales.

In 2013, Carr edited the first academically focused volume of papers to detail Frank Zappa's legacy, Frank Zappa and the And, appearing as part of the Ashgate Popular and Folk Music Series. Drawing together an international list of writers from both the academic and music worlds, it is a collection that links and appraises a wide range of Zappa's work and influence including modernism, technology, satire, avant-garde, cinema and mortality.
