= The Dream of the Blue Turtles =

Studio album by Sting
- Released: 17 June 1985
- Recorded: March – April 1985
- Studios: Blue Wave Recording Studios, St. Philip, Barbados; Le Studio, Morin-Heights, Quebec
- Genres: Pop rock; jazz rock
- Length: 41:40
- Label: A&M
- Producers: Sting; Pete Smith

Sting chronology
The Dream of the Blue Turtles (1985)	Bring On the Night (1986)

Singles from The Dream of the Blue Turtles
- 1. "If You Love Somebody Set Them Free" Released: May 1985; 2. "Love Is the Seventh Wave" Released: August 1985 (UK); 3. "Fortress Around Your Heart" Released: August 1985 (US); 4. "Russians" Released: November 1985; 5. "Moon Over Bourbon Street" Released: February 1986; 6. "We Work the Black Seam" Released: June 1986

The Dream of the Blue Turtles is the debut solo studio album by the English musician Sting, released on 17 June 1985. The album reached number three on the UK Albums Chart and number two on the US Billboard 200.

Five singles were released from the album: "If You Love Somebody Set Them Free", "Fortress Around Your Heart", "Russians", "Moon Over Bourbon Street", and "Love Is the Seventh Wave". The album earned Grammy nominations for Album of the Year, Best Male Pop Vocal Performance and Best Engineered Recording; the instrumental title track was nominated for Best Jazz Instrumental Performance.

A digital-only special expanded edition of The Dream of the Blue Turtles was released on 11 July 2025 to celebrate its fortieth anniversary. The version includes B-sides such as "Another Day" and "The Ballad of Mac the Knife", as well as remixes of "If You Love Somebody Set Them Free", "Love Is the Seventh Wave", "Moon Over Bourbon Street" and "Fortress Around Your Heart".

== Background and release ==
The album is named after a dream that Sting had. He initially worked on tracks for his debut solo album with producers Torch Song: William Orbit, Laurie Mayer and Grant Gilbert. These sessions were more synth-driven and 'electrofunk' in nature than what eventually was recorded and released; Sting eventually decided against this direction, and instead decided to pursue more jazz-oriented music.

Thus, in January 1985, he began assembling his backing band after holding auditions for jazz musicians in New York, including the likes of Omar Hakim, Branford Marsalis, Kenny Kirkland, and Darryl Jones. Subsequently, he rehearsed the material with his band for a week before three surprise concerts at The Ritz in New York in late February; Sting's idea was for a "baptism of fire" to help consolidate the band's identity before recording began in early March. Seven weeks were spent recording the songs at Eddy Grant's Blue Wave Studio in Barbados, followed by mixing at Le Studio in Quebec.

Although the single "If You Love Somebody Set Them Free" reached No. 3 in the US, it only reached 26 in the UK, where the album's track "Russians" (about Cold War nuclear anxieties, which had peaked in the 1980s) proved more popular.

In the UK the album was kept off No. 1 in the week of its release by Marillion's Misplaced Childhood and Born in the U.S.A. by Bruce Springsteen occupying the top two places. In the US, the album reached No. 2 on the Billboard 200.

The film Bring On the Night documents some of the recording work that produced this album, as well as the subsequent tour.

== Songs ==
The songs include "Children's Crusade", which was demoed at AIR Studios on a 48-track machine. The song relates to the destruction of the younger generation in World War I. "Shadows in the Rain" had originally appeared on Zenyatta Mondatta by the Police and was re-recorded for The Dream of the Blue Turtles. "We Work the Black Seam" was about the UK miners' strike of 1984–85 and musically based on "Savage Beast", a song dating back to Sting's days in Last Exit. Sting played double bass on "Moon Over Bourbon Street", which was inspired by Anne Rice's novel Interview with the Vampire. "Consider Me Gone" references the first quatrain of Shakespeare's Sonnet 35.

== Critical reception ==
Professional ratings
Review scores
Source	Rating
AllMusic	4/5 stars
Chicago Tribune	2.5/4 stars
Los Angeles Times	3/4 stars
Orlando Sentinel	5/5 stars
Record Mirror	4/5
Rolling Stone	4/5 stars
The Rolling Stone Album Guide	3.5/5 stars
The Sacramento Bee	4/4 stars
Smash Hits	6/10
The Village Voice	C+

The Dream of the Blue Turtles received critical acclaim, although both rock and jazz purists objected to the two genres being mixed together. Creem critic Richard Riegel described it as a modest, intelligent album and "a welcome and probably deliberate retreat from all the superstar hysteria that had been building up around the Police the past few years." Pete Bishop of The Pittsburgh Press felt the album "borders on brilliant", praising the songs, musicianship, production and Sting's vocals, "full of feeling from pain to exuberance". Rolling Stone critic Jon Pareles praised Sting for making a solo album of "brilliantly enlightened self-interest" rather than a Police-style record, praising the young jazz musicians for avoiding "pop-jazz clichés" and Sting for being able to swing, although noting that, except for three tracks, "the Blue Turtles is a pop record above all. It's only a jam session between the lines, where Marsalis answers Sting's voice with slyly ubiquitous fanfares and curlicues and epigrams." Eurotipsheet later named it the best debut album of 1985, further grouping it among "the most exciting solo albums that have come out this year and one that crossed the rigid borders between pop and jazz".

In a mixed review, Smash Hits critic Ian Cranna felt that many songs were spoilt by Sting shoehorning "awkward attempts to show you can be rich and still care into uncomfortably simplistic lyrics – exactly the kind of thing that gets 'political' pop a bad name", but he nonetheless praised the energetic production, the woodwind orchestral parts and the more personal songs. Robert Christgau of The Village Voice felt that not since Paul Simon had a pop star "made such a beeline for the middlebrow cliché", adding that "[by] displacing the Police's sere dynamics we have bathtubs full of demijazz, drenching this self-aggrandizing and no doubt hitbound project in a whole new dimension of phony class." In a review named "Sting's Blue Turtles poses as art outside the mainstream", Rick Shefchik of The Daily News considered it superior to any Police albums because the jazz musicians "are better at disguising Sting's exotic poses as art", but lamented that only few of the songs let listeners "find out what kind of a guy [Sting] really is". However, he singled out the Kurt Weill-esque "Moon Over Bourbon Street" as a promising exception.

Retrospectively, AllMusic critic Stephen Thomas Erlewine opines that, while the critical shorthand of Blue Turtles being "Sting's jazz record" is partly true, it is more accurate to say Sting relied on revivalist musicians who were still developing their own style, "and then had them jam on mock-jazz grooves – or, in the case of Branford Marsalis, layer soprano sax lines on top of pop songs." Erlewine felt that, "with every measure, every verse, Sting cries out for the respect of a composer, not a pop star, and it gets to be a little overwhelming when taken as a whole." Noting that Sting abandoned "mere rock" to work with highly-skilled American jazz players, Ira Robbins of Trouser Press writes: "The auteur sounds like he's having a bloody fine time jamming with such cool cats, but the results mainly point up the narrow possibilities of his singing. And despite the illustrious company and his switch from bass to guitar, Sting alone is still like Sting in the Police: smug and pretentious." Pieter de Bruyn Kops of Music & Media contended that the album "showed that Still was still searching for a true direction."

Among reference books, Colin Larkin wrote in The Encyclopedia of Popular Music (1997) that Blue Turtles found Sting developing "the more cerebral lyrics" found on the Police's Synchronicity (1983), whereas Martin C. Strong of The Great Rock Discography (2006) describes the album as "an endearing set of jazz-influenced, infectiously off-kilter pop songs". Blue Turtles is named one of Sting's best albums in The Rough Guide to Rock (1999), where Jonathan Holden calls it "[an] enjoyable jazzy record, if a touch ponderous in places." In The Rolling Stone Album Guide (2004), J. D. Considine writes that "it's the balance between the melodic appeal of [Sting's] songs and the improvisational fire of his band that gives The Dream of the Blue Turtles its character. How that works varies somewhat from song to song, but for the most part it's a matter of mood in which the arrangements set the emotional context for each song."

== Accolades ==
Grammy Awards

Year	Nominee / work	Award	Result
1986	The Dream of the Blue Turtles	Album of the Year	Nominated
1986	The Dream of the Blue Turtles	Best Pop Vocal Performance, Male	Nominated

== Track listing ==
All tracks are written by Sting, except "Russians", which is written by Sting and Sergei Prokofiev.

Side one
No.	Title	Length
1.	"If You Love Somebody Set Them Free"	4:16
2.	"Love Is the Seventh Wave"	3:32
3.	"Russians"	3:58
4.	"Children's Crusade"	5:02
5.	"Shadows in the Rain"	4:50

Side two
No.	Title	Length
6.	"We Work the Black Seam"	5:42
7.	"Consider Me Gone"	4:20
8.	"The Dream of the Blue Turtles"	1:18
9.	"Moon Over Bourbon Street"	4:00
10.	"Fortress Around Your Heart"	4:40
Total length:		41:40

== Singles ==
- "If You Love Somebody Set Them Free" (1985) No. 3 US Hot 100, No. 26 UK Singles Chart
- "Russians" (1985) No. 16 US Hot 100, No. 12 UK Singles Chart
- "Fortress Around Your Heart" (1985) No. 8 US Hot 100, No. 49 UK Singles Chart
- "Love Is the Seventh Wave" (1985) No. 17 US Hot 100, No. 41 UK Singles Chart
- "Moon Over Bourbon Street" (1986) No. 44 UK Singles Chart – with a B-side of "The Ballad of Mack the Knife"

== Personnel ==
Adapted from the album's liner notes.

- Sting – lead vocals, backing vocals, guitars, Synclavier, bass (2, 10), double bass (9), arrangements
- Omar Hakim – drums
- Kenny Kirkland – keyboards, synthesizers
- Darryl Jones – bass
- Branford Marsalis – soprano saxophone, tenor saxophone, clarinet, percussion
- Dolette McDonald – backing vocals
- Janice Pendarvis – backing vocals

=== Additional musicians ===
- Danny Quatrochi – Synclavier, backing vocals
- Eddy Grant – congas (7)
- Frank Opolko – trombone (2)
- Pete Smith – backing vocals
- Elliot Jones – backing vocals
- Jane Alexander – backing vocals
- Vic Garbarini – backing vocals
- Pamela Quinlan – backing vocals
- The Nannies Chorus – backing vocals
- Rosemary Purt – backing vocals
- Stephanie Crewdson – backing vocals
- Joe Sumner – backing vocals
- Kate Sumner – backing vocals
- Michael Sumner – backing vocals
- Dominic Muldowney – arrangements (10)

=== Technical ===
- Produced by Sting and Pete Smith
- Engineered by Pete Smith
- Mastered by Bob Ludwig at Masterdisk (New York, NY)
- Photography – Max Vadukul and Danny Quatrochi
- Art direction and design – Michael Ross and Richard Frankel
- Management – Miles Copeland and Kim Turner

== Charts ==
=== Weekly charts ===
Weekly chart performance for The Dream of the Blue Turtles
Chart (1985–1986)	Peak position
Australian Kent Music Report	1
Austrian Albums Chart	13
Canadian Albums Chart	4
Dutch Albums Chart	1
German Albums Chart	4
Japanese Oricon LP Chart	9
New Zealand Albums Chart	4
Norwegian VG-lista Albums Chart	4
Swedish Albums Chart	5
Swiss Albums Chart	6
UK Albums Chart	3
US Billboard 200	2

=== Year-end charts ===
1985 year-end chart performance for The Dream of the Blue Turtles
Chart (1985)	Position
Australian Albums Chart	18
Canadian Albums Chart	12
Japanese Albums Chart	71
New Zealand Albums (RMNZ)	14
Swiss Albums Chart	27
UK Albums Chart	37
US Billboard 200	50

1986 year-end chart performance for The Dream of the Blue Turtles
Chart (1986)	Position
Australian Albums Chart	7
Canadian Albums Chart	71
New Zealand Albums (RMNZ)	28
UK Albums Chart	41
US Billboard 200	33

=== Decade-end charts ===
Decade-end chart performance for The Dream of the Blue Turtles
Chart (1980–1989)	Position
Australian Albums Chart	32

== Certifications and sales ==
Certifications and sales for The Dream of the Blue Turtles
Region	Certification	Certified units/sales
Australia	—	200,000
Canada (Music Canada)	Platinum	100,000^{^}
France (SNEP)	Platinum	300,000^{*}
Germany (BVMI)	Platinum	500,000^{^}
Hong Kong (IFPI Hong Kong)	Gold	10,000^{*}
Italy (FIMI)	Platinum	500,000
New Zealand (RMNZ)	Platinum	15,000^{^}
Spain (Promusicae)	Gold	50,000^{^}
United Kingdom (BPI)	2× Platinum	600,000^{^}
United States (RIAA)	3× Platinum	3,000,000^{^}
Yugoslavia	—	50,000
^{*} Sales figures based on certification alone.^{^} Shipments figures based on certification alone.
