= Between the Earth and Sky (Lankum album) =

Studio album by Lankum
- Released: 27 October 2017
- Genre: Folk
- Length: 56:49
- Label: Rough Trade
- Producer: John Murphy; Lankum

Lankum chronology
Cold Old Fire (2014)	Between the Earth and Sky (2017)	The Livelong Day (2019)

Between the Earth and Sky is the second studio album by Irish folk music group Lankum, released on 27 October 2017 through Rough Trade Records. It is their first album under the name Lankum and their first released on Rough Trade. It received positive reviews from critics and peaked at number 17 on the Irish Albums Chart.

== Critical reception ==
Professional ratings
Aggregate scores
Source	Rating
AnyDecentMusic?	7.7/10
Metacritic	90/100
Review scores
Source	Rating
The Guardian	5/5 stars
The Independent	4/5 stars
The Irish Times	3/5 stars
Record Collector	5/5 stars

Between the Earth and Sky received a score of 90 out of 100 on review aggregator Metacritic based on five critics' reviews, indicating "universal acclaim". The Guardian's Jude Rogers wrote that Lankum "marry the rawness of the Watersons with the roar of Richard Dawson, and eerie drones plunge their coarse, clattering harmonies further into darkness" and that they "inhabit a harsh, uncomfortable world, but a vital one". Mojo stated that the album's "raw, emotional heartbeat is laid bare at the onset", while Uncut felt that the band's "battery-acid sharp Dransfields harmonies and uilleann pipe drones ensure their second album is powerfully strange".

The Independent's Andy Gill remarked that Between the Earth and Sky "offers an object lesson in how to perform old songs in new ways, without losing the essential sense of continuity that gives traditional music its timeless appeal". Alex Neilson of Record Collector called the album the "perfect summation of this extraordinary ensemble – this is music tethered deep in the black, black earth whose only limit is the blue, blue sky". Ian Maleney of The Irish Times wrote that the album "can feel a little safe" and "a little too tightly bound. The voices and stories captured here are undoubtedly powerful and necessary, and sometimes quite moving, but there's yet more hidden in the wilds and badlands of tradition than this record admits."

== Track listing ==
Between the Earth and Sky track listing
No.	Title	Length
1.	"What Will We Do When We Have No Money?"	5:49
2.	"Sergeant William Bailey"	5:23
3.	"Peat Bog Soldiers"	2:53
4.	"The Townie Polka"	6:59
5.	"Bad Luck to the Rolling Water"	5:18
6.	"Déanta in Éireann"	8:14
7.	"The Granite Gaze"	5:35
8.	"The Turkish Reveille"	11:45
9.	"Willow Garden"	4:53
Total length:		56:49

== Charts ==
Chart performance for Between the Earth and Sky
Chart (2017)	Peak position
Irish Albums (IRMA)	17
UK Independent Albums (OCC)	26
