= False Lankum =

Studio album by Lankum
- Released: 24 March 2023
- Studios: Hellfire, Dublin, Ireland
- Genre: Folk
- Length: 70:24
- Label: Rough Trade
- Producers: John Murphy; Lankum

Lankum chronology
The Livelong Day (2019)	False Lankum (2023)

False Lankum is the fourth studio album by Irish folk music group Lankum, released on 24 March 2023 through Rough Trade Records. It received positive reviews from critics and peaked at number two on the Irish Albums Chart. The album was shortlisted for the 2023 Mercury Prize and appeared on several best-of lists for 2023 albums.

== Critical reception ==
Professional ratings
Aggregate scores
Source	Rating
AnyDecentMusic?	8.3/10
Metacritic	89/100
Review scores
Source	Rating
AllMusic	5/5 stars
Clash	8/10
The Guardian	5/5 stars
The Irish Times	4.5/5 stars
Mojo	4/5 stars
Pitchfork	7.7/10
Record Collector	4/5 stars
Uncut	4.5/5 stars

False Lankum received a score of 89 out of 100 on review aggregator Metacritic based on eight critics' reviews, indicating "universal acclaim". AllMusic's Timothy Monger described the album as a "nihilistic, almost comically bleak trek into the dark heart of folk music" as well as "a difficult but defining statement made at the height of their powers". Jude Rogers of The Guardian felt that it "teems with similar moments of iridescent bliss" and its tracks "also unfurl into each other without a break, alternately lulling the listener then casting them into storms of shuddering sounds". Siobhán Long of The Irish Times wrote that Lankum have "chosen to balance the darkness with copious shafts of light and delicate beauty" and the album "positions Lankum in a space that's utterly their own: delighting in the myriad influences that colour their sound".

Jim Wirth of Mojo opined that the album "offers hurricane-force drama at times" and "also tells a less grisly tale about growing up and realising that your swashbuckling days might be over. If modern folk music needs its own OK Computer, its own The Dark Side of the Moon, or indeed its own F♯A♯∞, this may well be it". Rob Young of Uncut found False Lankum to be "some measure their most ambitious in terms of instrumentation, arrangements and the sheer creation of atmosphere" and stated that the band "have found a convincing way to keep the damn hulk going, stoking the engines of folk tradition and setting course to who knows when". Shaun Curran of Record Collector characterized it as "definitely a demanding listen, but an extraordinary one".

Clash's Craig Howieson wrote that the band "continue to mine some of the finest – and criminally overlooked – songs of folk music's past and tailor them to the zeitgeist", concluding that the album "will one day too become a historical artefact", but "one which will brighten the future of those who devote time to its unique majesty". Ryan Leas, reviewing the album for Pitchfork, called it "spellbinding" and felt that the band "uncovers eerie new depths in centuries-old forms" on an album that "plays less like discrete songs and more as one long fever dream composed of scenes from across centuries".

=== Accolades ===
False Lankum on year-end lists
Publication	List	Rank
Mojo	The 75 Best Albums of 2023	3
The Quietus	Quietus Albums Of The Year 2023	1
Uncut	The 75 Best Albums of 2023	1
The Guardian	The 50 Best Albums of 2023	1

== Track listing ==
False Lankum track listing
No.	Title	Writer(s)	Length
1.	"Go Dig My Grave"	Jean Ritchie	8:38
2.	"Clear Away in the Morning"	Gordon Bok	7:00
3.	"Fugue I"	Lynch, Lynch, Peat, MacDiarmada	1:06
4.	"Master Crowley's"	Traditional	5:45
5.	"Newcastle"	Traditional	5:43
6.	"Fugue II"	Lynch, Lynch, Peat, MacDiarmada	0:59
7.	"Netta Perseus"	Daragh Lynch	4:40
8.	"The New York Trader"	Traditional	7:40
9.	"Lord Abore and Mary Flynn"	Traditional	8:38
10.	"Fugue III"	Lynch, Lynch, Peat, MacDiarmada	2:05
11.	"On a Monday Morning"	Cyril Tawney	5:12
12.	"The Turn"	Daragh Lynch	12:58
Total length:			70:24

== Charts ==
Chart performance for False Lankum
Chart (2023)	Peak position
Belgian Albums (Ultratop Flanders)	83
Dutch Albums (Album Top 100)	40
Irish Albums (Official Charts)	2
Scottish Albums (Official Charts)	13
UK Albums (Official Charts)	47
UK Folk Albums (Official Charts)	1
UK Independent Albums (Official Charts)	4
