= Lankum =

Irish folk band

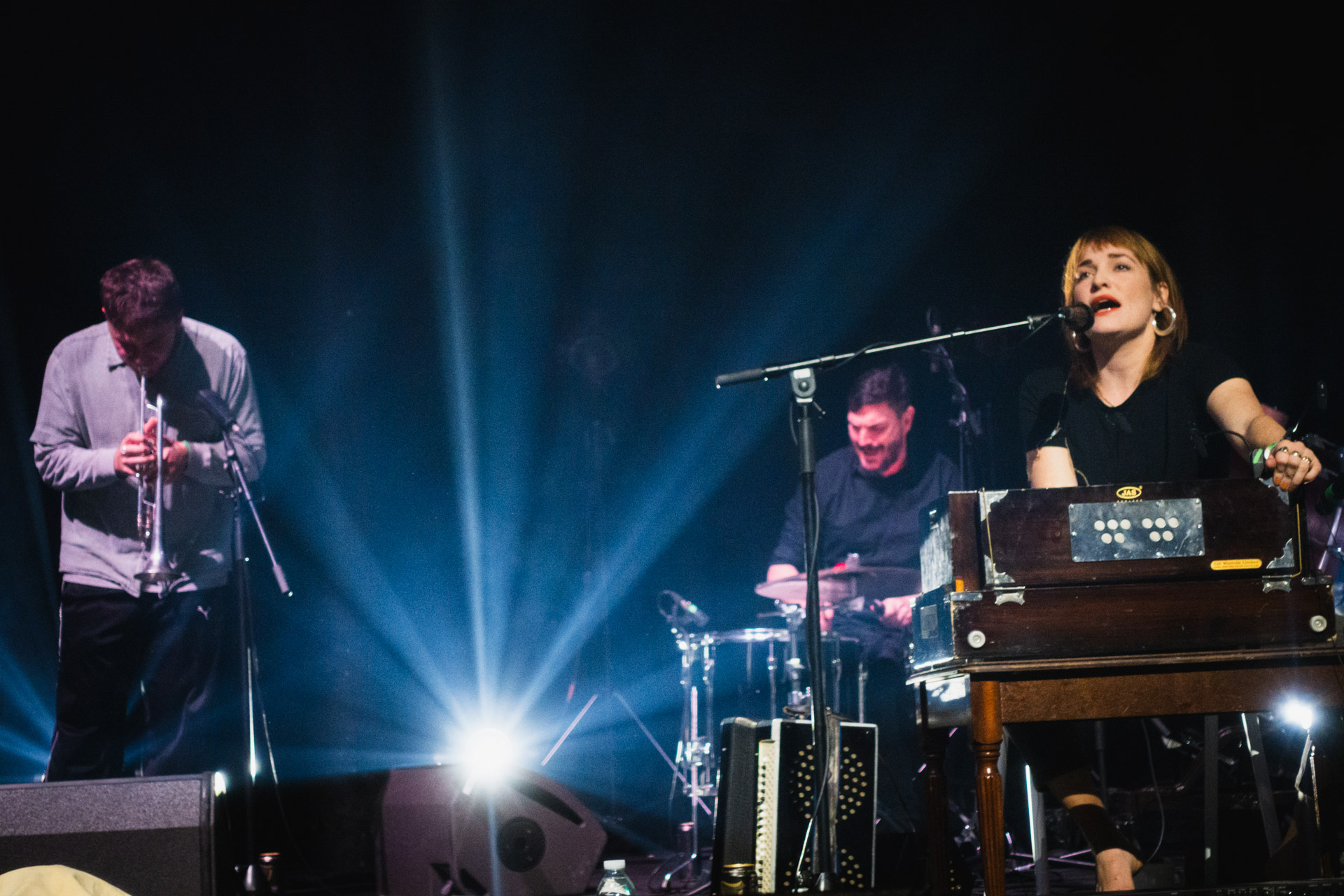
- At The Roundhouse in London in 2023.

Background information
- Also known as: Lynched (2002–2016)
- Origin: Dublin, Ireland
- Genres: Folk; drone; traditional; contemporary folk; progressive folk; psychedelic folk; folk punk
- Years active: 2002–present
- Label: Rough Trade
- Members: Ian Lynch; Daragh Lynch; Cormac MacDiarmada; Radie Peat
- Website: lankumdublin.com

Lankum are a contemporary Irish folk music group from Dublin, consisting of multi-instrumentalists Ian Lynch, Daragh Lynch, Cormac MacDiarmada and Radie Peat.

Originally a duo consisting of the Lynch brothers, known as Lynched, the pair released their debut album, Where Did We Go Wrong?! in 2003. Returning to Ireland, after a spell of international touring, the brothers deepened their interest in Dublin's Irish traditional music sessions which introduced them to vocalist and multi-instrumentalist Radie Peat and violinist Cormac MacDiarmada.

Recording as the core four-piece band, they released the albums Cold Old Fire in 2014 and Between the Earth and Sky in 2017. In 2018, they were named Best Folk Group at the RTÉ Folk Music Awards, while Radie Peat was named Best Folk Singer. The band were nominated for the RTÉ Choice Music Prize Irish Album of the Year in 2017 for their album Between the Earth and Sky, and won the prize in 2019 and 2024 for their albums The Livelong Day and False Lankum.

The band's fourth studio album, False Lankum (2023), was released to widespread critical acclaim and increased the band's exposure significantly. It was nominated for the Mercury Prize and placed highly on several end-of-year lists. In 2024 the band released a live album Live in Dublin, recorded across three sold out nights at Dublin's Vicar Street.

== History ==
=== Early years, Where Did We Go Wrong? and Irish traditional sessions (2000–2014) ===
Leaving school at the age of 19, multi-instrumentalist Ian Lynch moved to London and spent a year street busking and living in squats. Upon returning to Ireland, he learned that his brother Daragh Lynch had begun learning to play the guitar, and the pair soon started writing songs together: "We started writing these really puerile half-joke, anti-authoritarian punk songs, and one that was in the style of David Bowie, about destroying the government in a cosmic way."

Named after the brothers' surname, the duo began performing and recording under the name Lynched. Their 2003 debut album, Where Did We Go Wrong?, was released on the independent label, Psalm O’The Vine, and became a small success, allowing the pair to tour: "We did a few gigs around Europe; crusty punk festivals, and then a tour of Mexico and America for three months. I was 23, and it was fucking mad."

The brothers deepened their interest in the many Irish traditional music sessions taking place in Dublin's pubs and bars, with Ian Lynch noting that this was "one of the most inspiring and influential things for Lankum, there would be no Lankum if it was not for the sessions." At these sessions the pair met singer and multi-instrumentalist Radie Peat and violinist Cormac MacDiarmada.

The four core members of the band came together through mutual unemployment and the connections made from playing at the sessions. Radie Peat noted, "That’s the circumstances that brought about us in the band: a lot of time, not enough money, on the dole. Trying to find something to do with your time and playing a lot of music. Grim, but not that grim. Grim, but having quite a good time."

=== Cold Old Fire and name change to Lankum (2014–2016) ===
The band released their debut album as a four-piece Cold Old Fire (2014) under the original name, Lynched. The album started as a recording by the original duo of the Lynch brothers, with Cormac MacDiarmada and Radie Peat joining the band officially during the sessions: "I just remember it clicking so well that we were like, shall we just ask them to play on the whole album? Before we knew it we were a four-piece band. It came together so well and so quickly." The album was financed in part by a Deis recording grant from the Arts Council Ireland.

In October 2016 they announced in a statement that they were changing their name to Lankum to avoid associations with the practice of lynching. The statement read: "We will not continue to work under our current name while the systemic persecution and murder of black people in the USA continues." The name Lankum comes from the folk ballad "False Lankum", as sung by the Irish traveller and folk singer John Reilly.

=== Between the Earth and Sky and The Livelong Day (2017–2022) ===
In 2017, the band signed to Rough Trade Records and recorded their album Between the Earth and Sky, to analogue tape with producer/ engineer Julie McLarnon, before recording the final track "the Granite Gaze", and mixing the album with producer John "Spud" Murphy in Guerrilla Studios, Dublin. It was released on 27 October 2017 and subsequently nominated for BBC Radio 2 Folk Awards. Mojo named it folk 'album of the year' 2017.

In 2019, the band recorded The Livelong Day with producer/engineer John "Spud" Murphy in the Meadows recording studio, Wicklow and in Guerrilla Studios, Dublin. It was released on 25 October 2019 and went on to win the RTÉ Choice Prize 2019.

In 2019, Lankum's video for "The Young People", directed by filmmaker Bob Gallagher, won Best Irish Music Video Award at the Irish Film Festival in London, England.

=== False Lankum (2023–present) ===
In 2023, Lankum were nominated for the Mercury Prize for their fourth album, False Lankum. They said about the prize: “It’s pretty crazy, considering where we started off twenty years ago as a joke band playing at parties and squats…”. When asked why they thought this album had been spotted or picked up, they said: "I think it might be the first time we’ve fully nailed the sound that we’ve been going for over the last few albums…it took a couple of decades". Lankum lost the award to the Ezra Collective. The album won the 2024 RTÉ Choice Music Prize and was nominated for the Best Album Ivor Novello Award.

Lankum played three sold out concerts at Dublin's Vicar Street, 29th - 31st May 2023. These were recorded and released as the album Live in Dublin in 2024. The concerts were also broadcast in a RTÉ Radio 1 programme, Gig on One broadcast 13th August 2023. In November 2023, a Lankum concert in Germany was cancelled because of pro-Palestine statements made by the band.

Lankum released a cover of The Specials' "Ghost Town" on 31 October 2025 through Rough Trade Records, originally created as a contribution to Oona Doherty’s dance show Specky Clark. In March 2026, a version of the Lankum's song "Hunting the Wren" with Fontaines D.C. singer Grian Chatten was part of the soundtrack for the movie Peaky Blinders: The Immortal Man.

== Artistry ==
Their music has been characterised as "a younger, darker Pogues with more astonishing power". Reviewing their third album The Livelong Day (2019) for The Guardian, Jude Rogers described it as "a folk album influenced by the ambient textures of Sunn O))) and Swans, plus the sonic intensity of Xylouris White and My Bloody Valentine".

== Side projects ==
Radie Peat and Lankum's producer John "Spud" Murphy are both members of the band ØXN, along with singer-songwriter and composer Katie Kim and Eleanor Myler. The band released their debut album, CYRM, in 2023 to critical acclaim.

Ian Lynch hosts and produces a monthly podcast, Fire Draw Near, which "investigates Irish traditional music and song in all of its myriad forms". A companion compilation album, featuring his discoveries, was released in 2021 on Rough Trade Recordings.

Ian released a solo album ...And Take the Black Worm With Me under the name "One Leg One Eye" in 2022 which came about during lockdown and has performed live with George Brennan. Ian Lynch's soundtrack for Paul Duane’s film All You Need Is Death was released in 2024 under his own name. In 2026, One Leg One Eye’s second album, Crone, was released.

Cormac MacDiarmada and Ruth Clinton from Landless play music and produce videos together as Poor Creature. They have been joined by John Dermody from The Jimmy Cake.

Cormac MacDiarmada and producer John "Spud" Murphy worked with Wild Beasts vocalist and bass guitarist Tom Fleming on his second solo album, Endless Rain, released under the name One True Pairing. The album was recorded in Dublin and released on Domino in October 2024.

Daragh Lynch together with Iona Zajac record the song "The Burning of Auchindoun" and performed for Tradition Now in 2022. He has also done a number of solo performances, including headlining the music for the Robert Tressell Festival in Dublin in 2024.

Radie Peat and Cormac MacDiarmada play music together as Rue, including a version of "Katie Cruel" which later appeared on The Livelong Day.

== Members ==
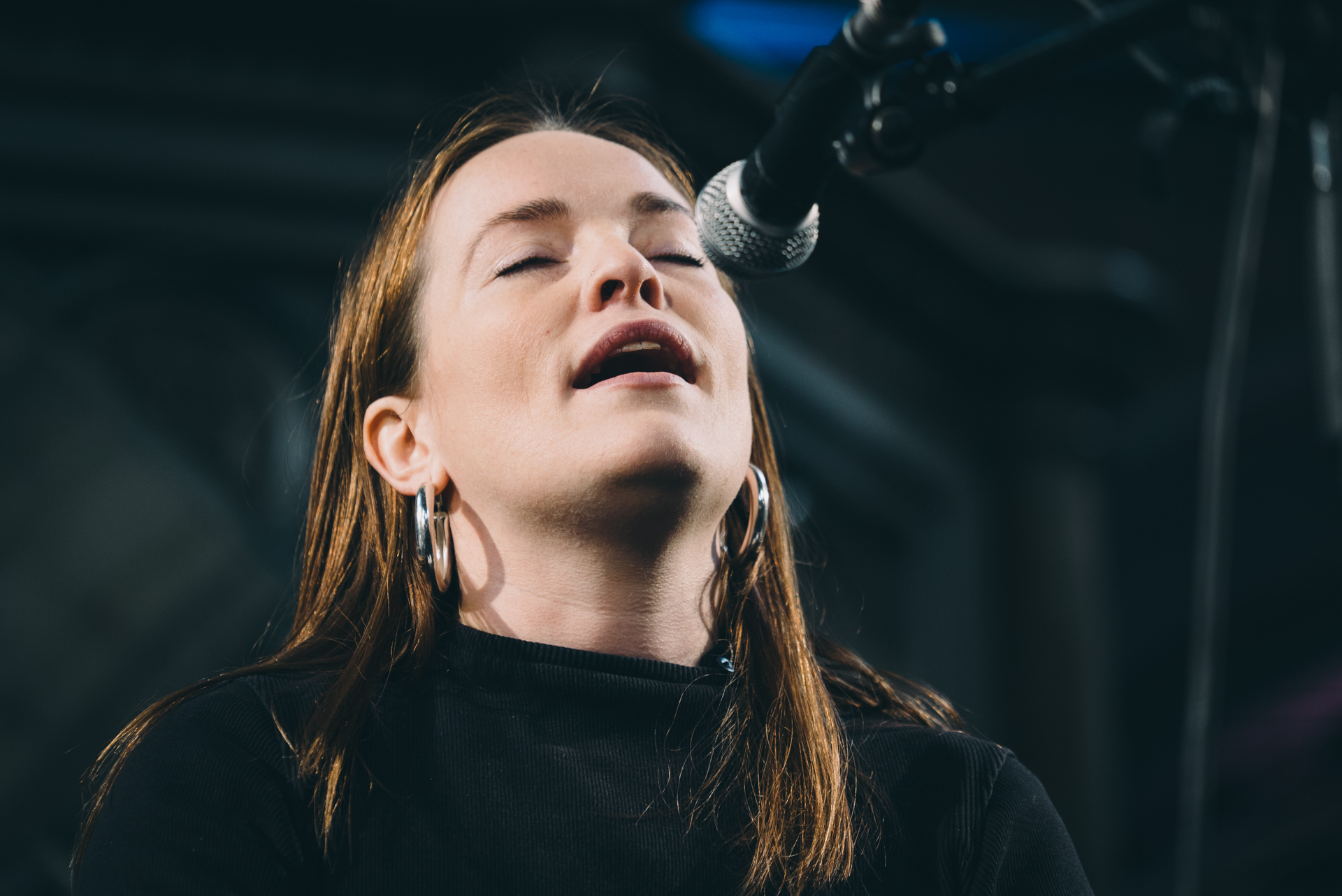
Radie Peat

Current members

- Ian Lynch – vocals, uilleann pipes, concertina, tin whistle, percussion, tape loops (2000–present)
- Daragh Lynch – vocals, guitar, percussion, piano (2000–present)
- Cormac Mac Diarmada – vocals, fiddle, viola, banjo, double bass, vibraphone, piano, percussion (2013–present)
- Radie Peat – vocals, bayan, concertina, harmonium, organ, piano, electric organ, harp, moog pedals, mellotron (2013–present)

Additional live musicians

- John Dermody – drums, percussion (2023–present)

Former members

- Cian Lawless – Lankum's manager and an early member of the band; wrote "Cold Old Fire"

== Discography ==
Studio albums

- Where Did We Go Wrong?! (2003) – as Lynched (only Ian and Daragh Lynch) ^{[NB]}
- Cold Old Fire (2014) – as Lynched
- Between the Earth and Sky (Rough Trade, 2017)
- The Livelong Day (Rough Trade, 2019)
- False Lankum (Rough Trade, 2023)

Live albums

- Live in Dublin (Rough Trade, 2024)

Singles

- "What Will We Do When We Have No Money" (Rough Trade, FLAC file, single, 2017)
- "Lullaby" (Loud And Quiet, Flexi-disc, 7", 33 ⅓ RPM, 2023) Included with Loud and Quiet magazine, Issue 162.
- "Ghost Town" [The Specials cover] (Rough Trade, 2025)

Other releases

- From Here: Then to Now (From Here Records, 2016) - with Stick in the Wheel. Download and a 24-page newspaper with articles about May Day origins and both bands talking about their song choice, interviewing each other.
- "The Planet That You're On" (Uncut cover CD, 2023) Uncut compilation curated by Lankum.

== Awards and nominations ==
=== Mercury Prize ===
Mercury Prize awards and nominations
Year	Nominee / work	Award	Result
2023	False Lankum	Album of the Year	Nominated

=== Ivor Novello Award ===
Ivor Novello Awards and nominations
Year	Nominee/ work	Award	Result
2024	False Lankum	Best Album	Nominated

=== RTÉ Choice Music Prize ===
RTÉ Choice Music Prize awards and nominations
Year	Nominee / work	Award	Result
2017	Between the Earth and Sky	Album of the Year	Nominated
2019	The Livelong Day	Album of the Year	Won
2023	Lankum	Artist of the Year	Nominated
2023	Go Dig My Grave	Song of the Year	Nominated
2023	False Lankum	Album of the Year	Won

=== RTÉ Radio 1 Folk Awards ===
Awards and nominations at the RTÉ Radio 1 Folk Awards
Year	Nominee / work	Award	Result
2018	Lankum	Best Folk Group	Won
2018	Radie Peat	Best Folk Singer	Won
2020	Lankum	Best Folk Group	Won
2020	Radie Peat	Best Folk Singer	Won
2023	Lankum	Best Folk Group	Won
2023	False Lankum	Best Folk Album	Won

=== BBC Radio 2 Folk Awards ===
Awards and nominations at the BBC Radio 2 Folk Awards
Year	Nominee / work	Award	Result
2016	Lynched	Best Group	Nominated
2016	Cold Old Fire	Best Album	Nominated
2016	Lynched	Horizon Award	Nominated
2018	Lankum	Best Group	Won
2018	The Granite Gaze	Best Original Song	Won

=== Other notable accolades ===
Other notable accolades
Year	Nominee / work	Award	Result
2019	The Livelong Day	NPR Music's 25 Best Albums of 2019	8th
2019	The Livelong Day	MOJO's 75 Best Albums of 2019	58th
2020	Lankum	The Irish Times 50 Best Irish Acts In Order	8th
2023	False Lankum	The Mercury Prize	Shortlisted
2023	False Lankum	The Guardian 50 Best Albums of 2023	1st
2023	False Lankum	The Telegraph 10 Best Albums of 2023	4th
2023	False Lankum	MOJO's 50 Best Albums of 2023	3rd

== Notes ==
^{NB} Ian and Darragh Lynch released Where Did We Do Wrong?! in 2003 as Lynched. However, it seems that this incarnation of Lynched is not the same musical project as that of the same name which would go on to become Lankum, as Cold Old Fire, released in 2014 with Cormac Mac Diarmada and Radie Peat, is often described as the group's "debut album".
