= Mexico at the 1900 Universal Exhibition in Paris =

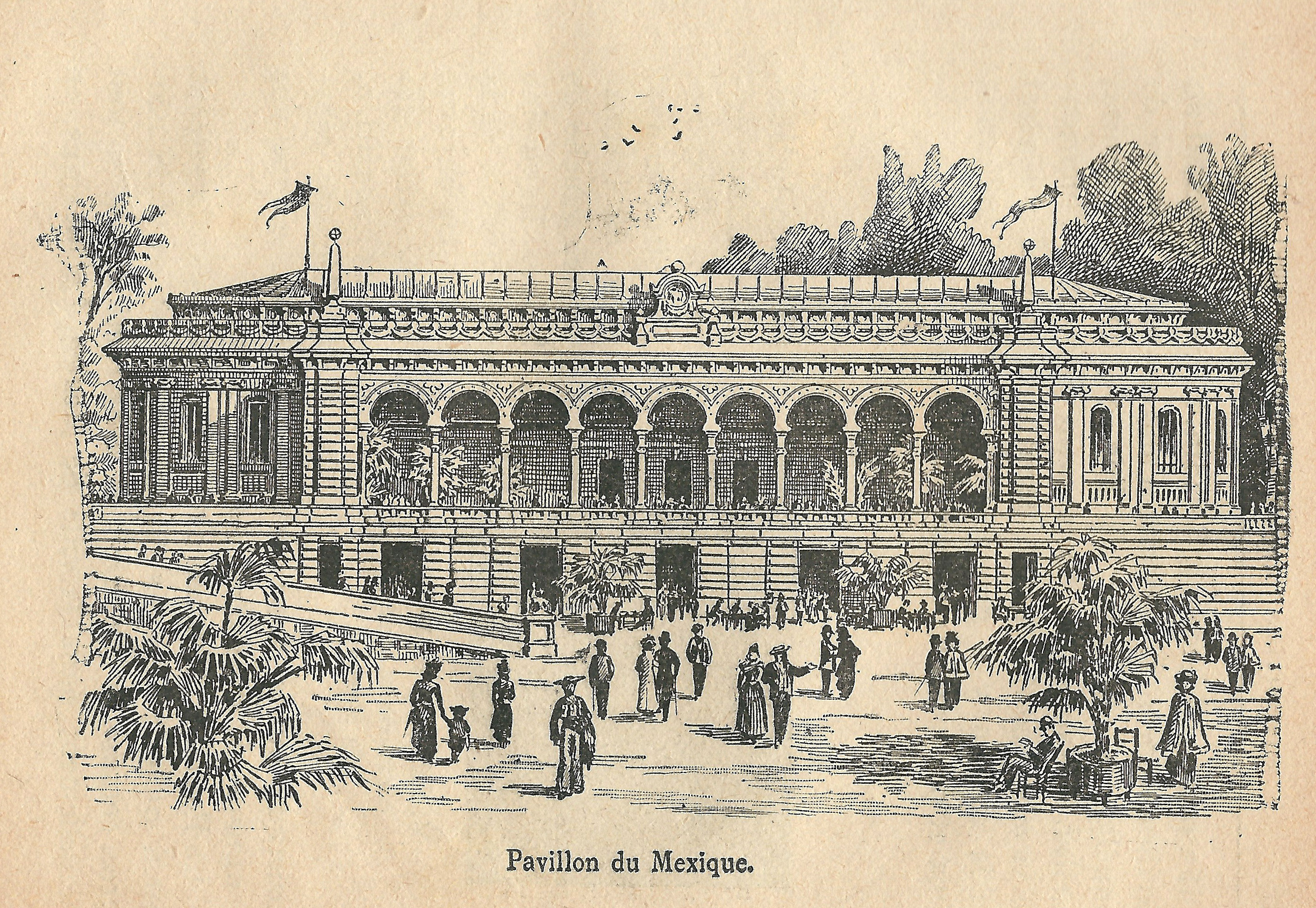
Mexico's pavilion

Mexico participated in the Universal Exhibition of Paris in 1900, on August 25 of that year. The theme that Mexico chose for its pavilion was modernity and the country's pre-Hispanic roots. The government of Porfirio Díaz wanted to show a facet of the country.

== Historical context ==
The World's fairs were a world forum for nations, both Eastern world and Western world, in which the scientific, technological and artistic advances of modernity were displayed. Paris was one of the most famous hosts in the 19th century, since they held these events with an almost exact periodicity of 11 years between each fair, thus earning the name of the capital of modernity of the 19th century.

Mexico was not far behind in the participation of the fairs, since it participated in 4 international fairs and 3 North American fairs, with the aim of joining the image of modernity, despite the economic and political problems that the country was going through, as they were the increase in foreign debt, lack of investment and constant protest riots. President Porfirio Díaz maintained the initiative for the participation of the Mexican State, not only with the objective of modernity as an image, but also to attract potential investors with the presentation of natural, mineral, cultural, artistic wealth, public safety and industrial advances, scientific and technological that the country was carrying out, positioning itself as a power.

The collections of objects sent by Mexico aspired to show a country that offered peace, security, justice, rare natural wealth, laws that protect life, property and the spirit of enterprise, recreating an image of Mexico as a territory of opportunity.

The first participation of Mexico in these exhibitions took place in the Exposition Universelle (1867) and from this moment, the participation of Mexico became more recurrent, returning to participate in the Exposition Universelle (1889) in Paris, with which it stimulated its interest in this type of event, culminating in a pavilion at the Exposition Universelle (1900) in Paris.

== Organization ==
The Mexican State organized its participation in the Exhibition based on the classification and delegation of positions, in accordance with the regulations for participation of Paris in the World's fair and according to the needs of Mexico. In the regulations that the nation of France sent, after receiving the confirmation letters of participation from the nations, it specified that each country had to appoint a representative, who was called "General Commissioner", who had to attend the official affairs of the Exposition Universelle (1900). In addition to this, the commissioner had to divide the tasks by classification group to the "Group Leaders", who had the task of organizing the invited exhibitors, stimulating the sponsorship of private companies, promoting the participation of Mexico within of the event, carry out the collection of the pieces to be exhibited as well as their packaging and shipment to the French nation and finally, the realization of the catalogs and inventory corresponding to each classification and sub-classification.

Instead, the General Delegate had the functions of representing the Mexican government in matters relating to the World's fair; keep in constant communication with the Ministry of Public Works about the progress of the organization and the decisions that were being made; the allocation of funds, the hiring of new personnel, and the creation of the regulations that the Mexican personnel had to follow during their stay in Paris.

=== Group leaders ===
The Minister Plenipotentiary of Mexico in Paris, general delegate, was in charge of Don Antonio de Mier y Celis, then the architect of the Mexican pavilion, Don Antonio M. Anza and lastly, Sebastián de Mier, who attended the Exposition Universelle (1900) in Paris on behalf of the Mexican government.

The group leaders of Mexico were selected as follows:

- Groups I, II, III, XVII and retrospective section: Fernando Ferrari Pérez
- Groups IV and VI: Luis Salazar Caraveo
- Group V: Rafael Ramos
- Group VII, VIII and X: José C. Segura
- Group VI: from Minas Carlos Sellerier
- Group IX and XV: José Ramírez
- Group XII and XIII: Eduardo E. Zárate
- Group XIV and XV: Dr. Manuel Flores
- Group XVIII: Colonel Rodrigo Valdés

== Dynamics of Mexico in the exhibition ==
In the participation of Mexico in the last Exposition Universelle (1889), an attempt was made to innovate the dynamics of the exhibition, by exhibiting the objects together with their raw materials without any work process, this with the aim of showing the modernist side of the nation; however, in the Exposition Universelle (1900), being of greater magnitude, in which Mexico was invited despite the previous political altercations between both nations, it was intended to demonstrate the technological, artistic, scientific and industrial advances that Mexico had made since the Last Exhibition, where the neo-Aztec palace had been built, a project carried out by the architects M. Anza and Antonio Peñafiel.

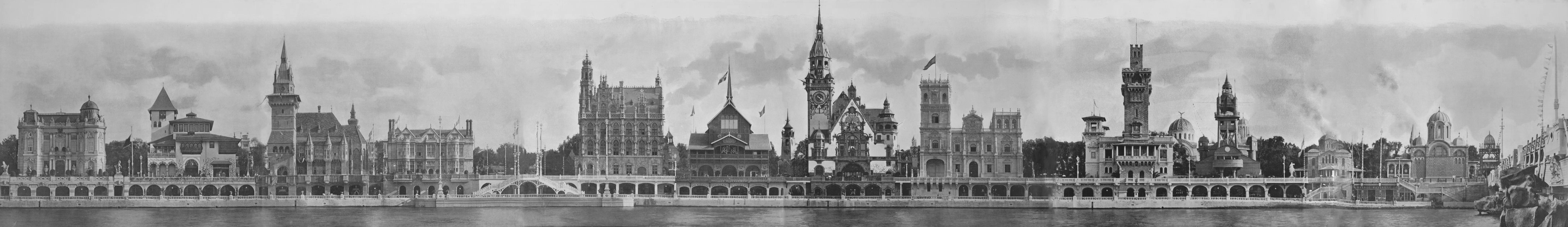

Mexico gave greater impetus to the promotion of local natural and agricultural products, bringing in producers who could negotiate directly with the international market.

All the natural wealth of the country, all its exploited products and all the articles of its manufacturing industries, boasting of its provident nature and the intelligence and industriousness of its children, so that the exhibition would result as a graphic summary of our productive power.

== Selection of categories II, III and VII ==
Circulars were sent to plastic artists, writers, historians, writers, photographers and architects, requesting their help to contribute to the participation of Mexico in the exhibition; the creators who responded to the letters were sent another circular, specifying the name of their creations and their technical requirements.

In total, the participation in the categories of Fine Arts, Literature and Science and Photography, had the following participations:

1. Painting, characters and drawings, 34
2. Engraving and lithography, 1
3. Sculpture and engraving on medals and gemstones, 10
4. Architecture, 12
5. Typography and various prints, 12
6. Photography, 47
7. Books, Music publisher, bookbinding, newspapers and advertisements, 187
8. Letters and gadgets for geography, cosmography and topography, 16
9. Precision instruments, 3
10. Medicine and surgery, 6
11. Musical instruments, 7
12. Theater and art supplies, 1

=== Fine arts ===
The selection and representation of Mexico in Paris was in charge of the sculptor Jesús Fructuoso Contreras, who since 1898 was in charge of supervising the participating artists of the World's fair.

Some participating artists were Leandro Izaguirre, Alberto Fuster, Gerardo Murillo, Jesús Fructuoso Contreras, Agustín Ocampo and Enrique Guerra.

The sculptural modernism that these pieces presented at the Exhibition was the expression of a modern symbol, which does not seek a realistic expression, as if it were a photographic print, on the contrary, it intended to be a sublimated, embellished, and idealized representation, with a finished unfinished, which sought to exalt the light and dark within the piece.

==== Malgré Tout ("nevertheless" or "in spite of everything") ====
Sculptural work in marble, made in 1898 by the sculptor Jesús Fructuoso Contreras, who during the World's fair, received the honorable mention The Knight's Cross of the Legion of Honour, for having made one of the most acclaimed sculptural pieces in the entire World's fair, despite its physical condition, having lost an arm as a result of cancer in his right arm.

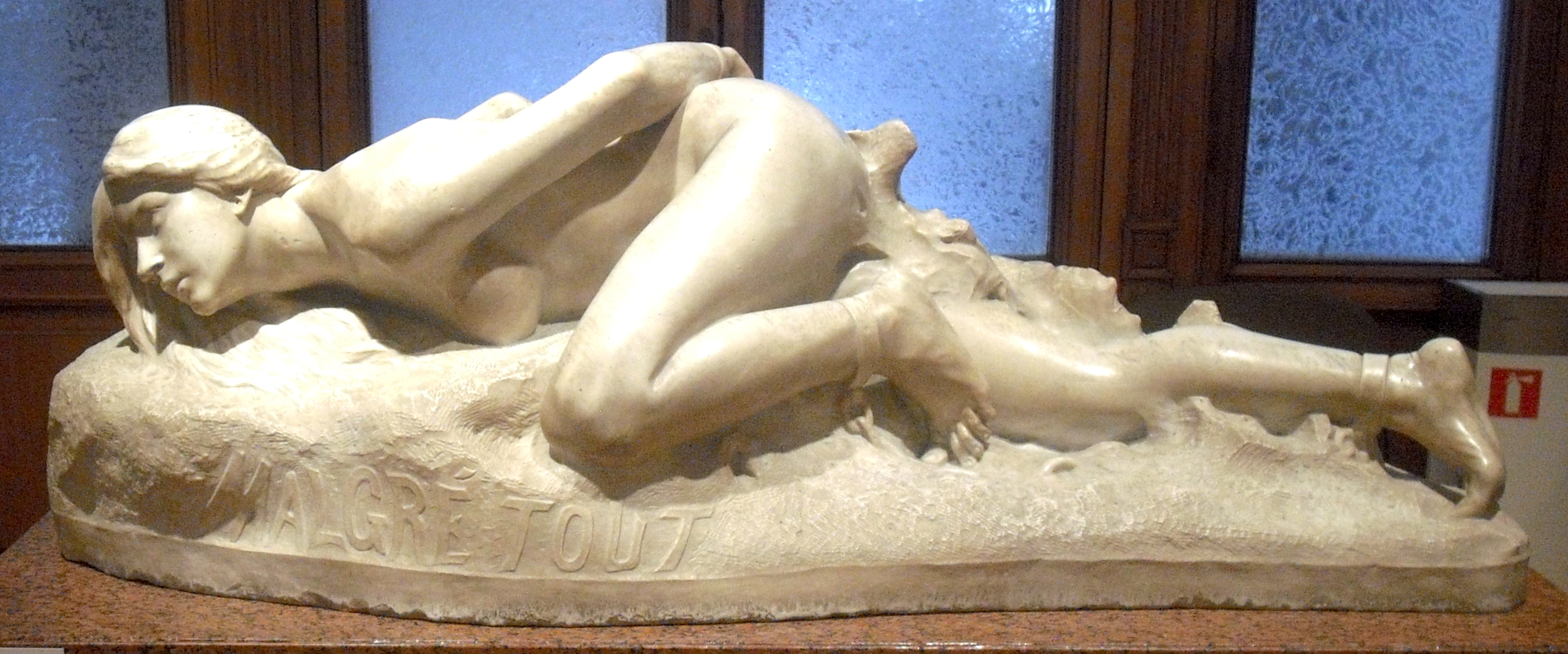

==== Dispossess ====
Sculptural work in marble, made by the sculptor Agustín Ocampo with a style that resembles Rodín, represents surrender and absolute despair. For a long time, the work was exhibited in the Alameda Central, Mexico City, as a work by Jesús Fructuoso Contreras, however, when conducting an investigation of the works exhibited at the World's fair, it turned out to be Ocampo's piece.

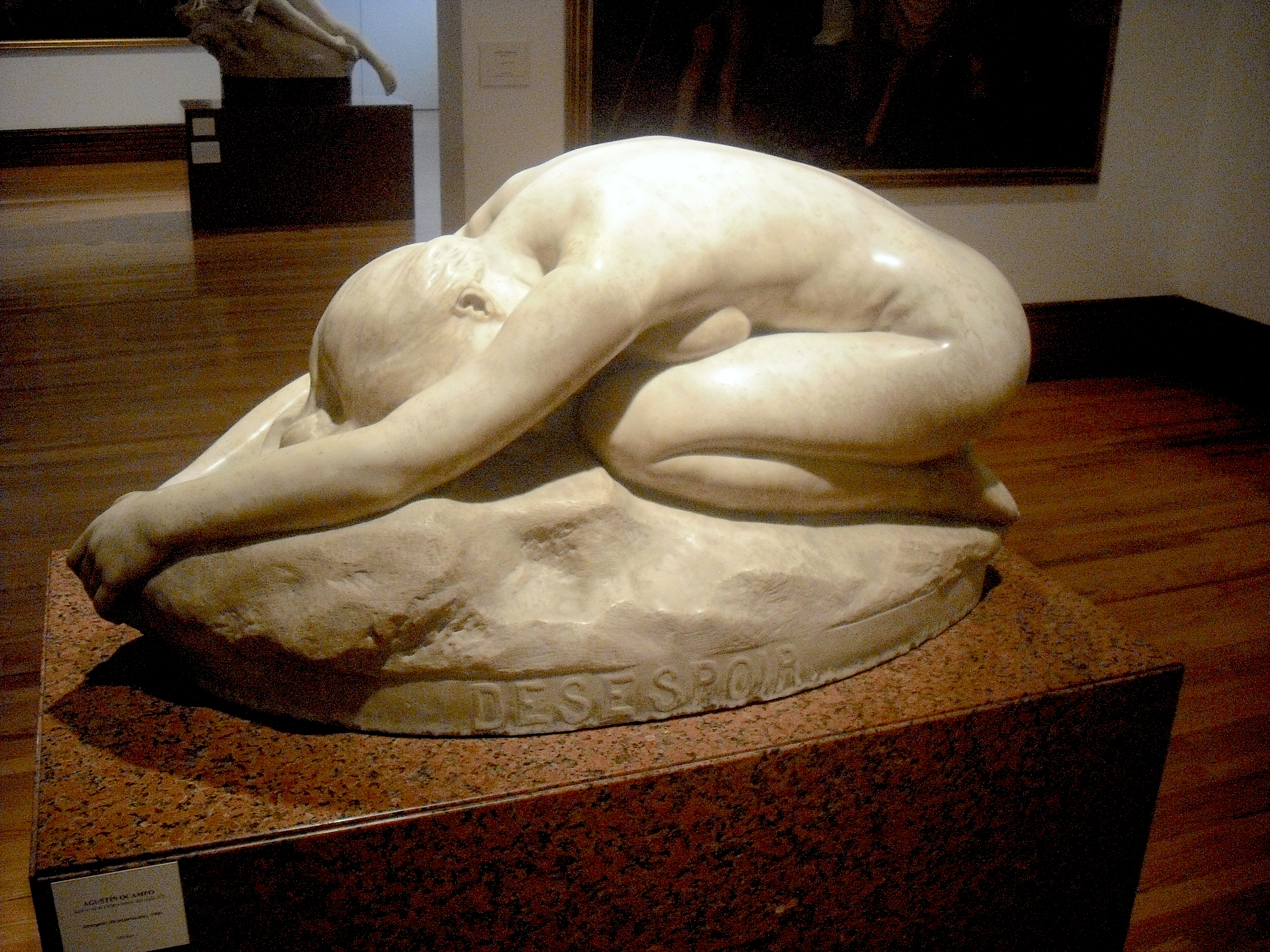

=== Mentions ===
==== Group II ====
- Grand prizes, 1
- Silver medals, 1
- Bronze medals, 3
- Honorable mentions, 6

==== Group III ====
- Grand prizes, 3
- Gold medals, 10
- Silver medals, 30
- Bronze medals, 23
- Honorable mentions, 25

==== Group VII ====
- Grand prizes, 10
- Gold medals, 21
- Silver medals, 64
- Bronze medals, 67
- Honorable mentions, 47

== Bibliography ==
- Rodríguez López, María Guadalupe (2016). Jesós F. Contreras en las exposiciones universales de París, 1889-1900. Universidad Autónoma de Aguascalientes. ISBN 978-607-8457-63-2. OCLC 982313356.

== See also ==
- List of world expositions
- Paris Expo Porte de Versailles
