= Gittler guitar =

Experimental guitar created by Allan Gittler

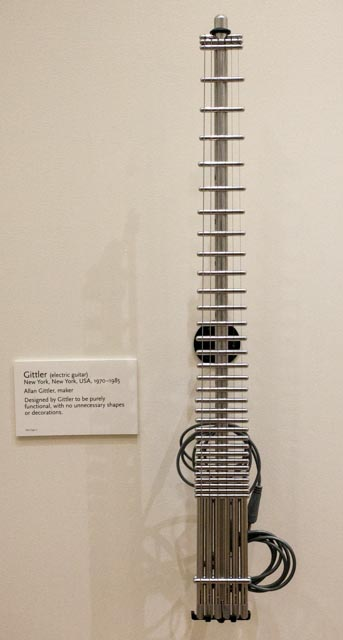
Gittler guitar (ca.1970-1985) exhibited at MIM PHX

The Gittler Guitar is an experimental designed guitar created by Allan Gittler (1928–2002). Gittler felt that sentimental design references to acoustic guitars are unnecessary in an electronically amplified guitar, and designed his instrument with the objective of reducing the electric guitar to the most minimal functional form possible.

== History ==
Gittler made 60 guitars in New York in the mid-1970s to early 1980s. Gittler sold one to Andy Summers, and it appears in the music video for The Police's 1983 song "Synchronicity II", and briefly in the video for "I Advance Masked" by Summers and Robert Fripp. In 1982, Gittler emigrated to Israel, settled in Hebron, changed his name to Avraham Bar Rashi, and licensed the design to a local company in Kiryat Bialik called Astron Engineer Enterprises LTD. They computer-machined around 300, though Bar Rashi put the number at 500; he was unhappy with the manufacturing, saying the metal box and plastic body were meant to cover up sloppy machining, and sent a letter to dealers distancing himself from the Israeli-made guitars.

The first 60 guitars produced are sometimes described as "Fishbone" guitars. Three Gittler basses also exist, made in New York and numbered 1, 2, and 3.

Allan Gittler also made a portable, battery-powered amplifier, cylindrical in shape, with a long handle that allowed it to be moved by rolling. Rolling was necessary to transport the amplifier, since it was quite heavy due to the large number of D batteries that powered it. He frequently used this set-up to play his guitar in a street adjoining Astor Place in lower Manhattan, where the reverberation from the surrounding buildings amplified the sound.

The Gittler guitar has six strings. Each string has its own pickup. Later versions have a plastic body. The steel frets, consisting of stainless steel bars pressure fitted into the stainless steel neck, give the instrument a sitar-like feel, as it is possible to bend the strings downward past where a wooden fretboard would prohibit the movement in a conventional guitar. However, this, depending on the thickness of the player's fingers, is not achievable on the highest frets, from about 25 to 31. The six individual pickups can be routed to divided outputs via D-sub-9-pin. or be mixed to a 1/4" TS connector. The built in pre-amps are powered by a 9 V battery or via D-sub connector. The New York version came without a pre-amp section; the individual pickups' signals were led into single cables, which could then be plugged into a mixing box or each separately amplified.

The Museum of Modern Art (MoMA) has one instrument in its collection, as does the Boston Museum of Fine Arts, which also has a later Bar Rashi wooden electric guitar. Gittler guitars can also be seen in several other museums and collections.

The only left-handed Gittler guitar known to exist was made by Bar Rashi himself in 1995 or 1996. It is a signed minimalist instrument, identical to the one he played in the later period of his life and made to order for a client in Jerusalem. There are only 12 separate parts in total and the frets are one long thread of nylon. This creates a unique sound.

== Current production ==
After Bar Rashi's passing in 2003, his eldest son, Yonatan, became a partner in Gittler Instruments LLC. The company has returned to manufacturing the Gittler guitar; presently, the company sells the instruments online. Gittler Instruments president Russ Rubman has extended the company's line to include upright basses and violins designed with the same principles of the original Gittler Guitar.
