= Instrumentality =

Instrumentality may refer to:

== Philosophy ==
- Instrumentality (theology), a theory that falls under the broader category of the prophetic model of biblical inspiration
- The theory of Instrumentalism in the philosophy of science
- The philosophical concept of Instrumental rationality

== Literature and entertainment ==
- Instrumentality of Mankind, refers to both the fictional world and the central government in many of the stories written by Cordwainer Smith (1939–1966)
- The Human Instrumentality Project from the Neon Genesis Evangelion anime series
- Instrumentality (album) (2006), from Luther Wright and the Wrongs

== See also ==
- Instrumental (disambiguation)
