= Underwater (disambiguation) =

Underwater refers to the realm below the surface of a body of water.

Underwater may also refer to:

== Film ==
- Underwater!, a 1955 film starring Jane Russell
- Underwater (film), a 2020 film starring Kristen Stewart

== Music ==
- Underwater (album), by Joshua Radin, 2012
- "Underwater" (Delerium song), 2002
- "Underwater" (Mika song), 2012
- "Underwater" (Rüfüs Du Sol song), 2018
- "Underwater", a song by Circa Zero from Circus Hero
- "Underwater", a song by Denzel Curry from 32 Zel/Planet Shrooms
- "Underwater", a song by Lady Antebellum from Ocean
- "Underwater", a song by Meghan Trainor from Treat Myself
- "Underwater", a song by the National from I Am Easy to Find
- "Underwater", a song by Red Velvet from Chill Kill
- "Underwater", a song by Switchfoot from The Legend of Chin

== Other uses ==
- Underwater (comics), a 1990s alternative comic by Chester Brown
- Negative equity or "underwater", when an asset is worth less than the balance of the loan used to secure it

== See also ==
- Unterwasser (German for "underwater"), a village in Switzerland
