= Instrument 1 =

Multi-instrument MIDI controller designed by Artiphon

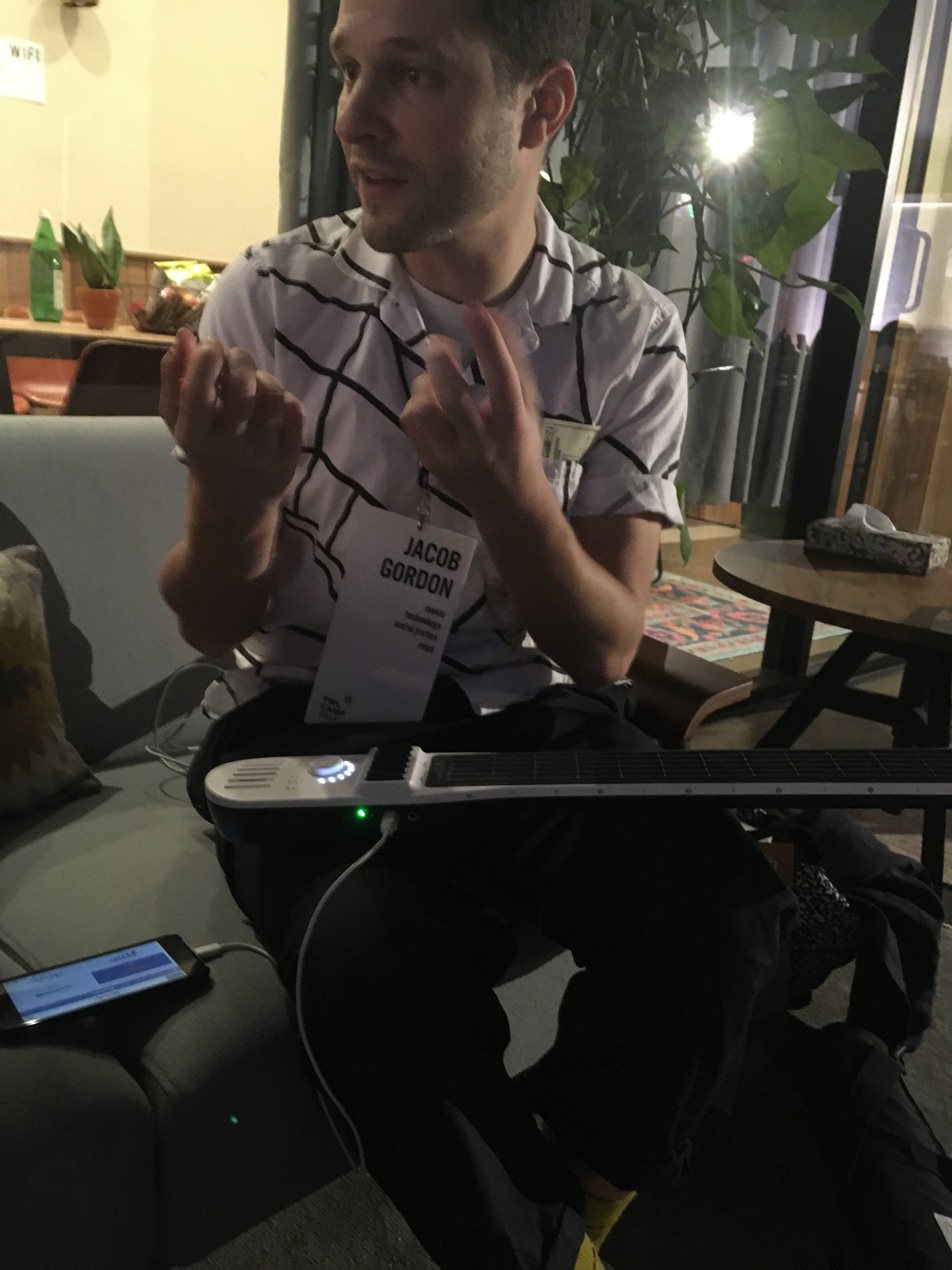
Jacob Gordon with an Instrument 1 at the Kickstarter Projects We Love Camp 2017

The Instrument 1 (sometimes stylised in all caps) is a MIDI controller designed by Artiphon, a Nashville-based music technology startup. The device was conceptualised in 2011 by Mike Butera, a fiddle player with a PhD in sound studies from Virginia Tech. The Instrument 1 is Artiphon's idea of a "universal musical instrument", one that can be used in ways according to the needs of each user. To this end, the Instrument 1 can be used like multiple conventional instruments (guitar, violin, drum kit or piano) or new instruments created using a companion app.

The Instrument 1 was prototyped five times before its release and changed substantially throughout this phase. These changes were made partly due to feedback from a beta test in 2014, which resulted in the materials used for the Instrument 1 changing from wood to plastic. A year later, in 2015, the sixth design of the Instrument 1 was the subject of a Kickstarter campaign. This campaign produced over $1.3 million, making it the most successful musical instrument Kickstarter in the site's history.

Critics received the Instrument 1 well; many compared it to other electronic string instruments, including the Gittler guitar and Omnichord. The Instrument 1 was nominated for multiple awards: it was named one of Time's "25 Best Inventions of 2015" and was a finalist in Fast Company's Innovation by Design awards.

The Instrument 1 has been used as a tool for helping people with disabilities make music. The device's versatility lets people with lowered muscle control and other similar disabilities take part in music making. A 2022 study used the Instrument 1 as an accessible instrument for whole class ensemble teaching in British primary schools. The Instrument 1 has also been used as an instrument for elderly people with arthritis.

== Background ==
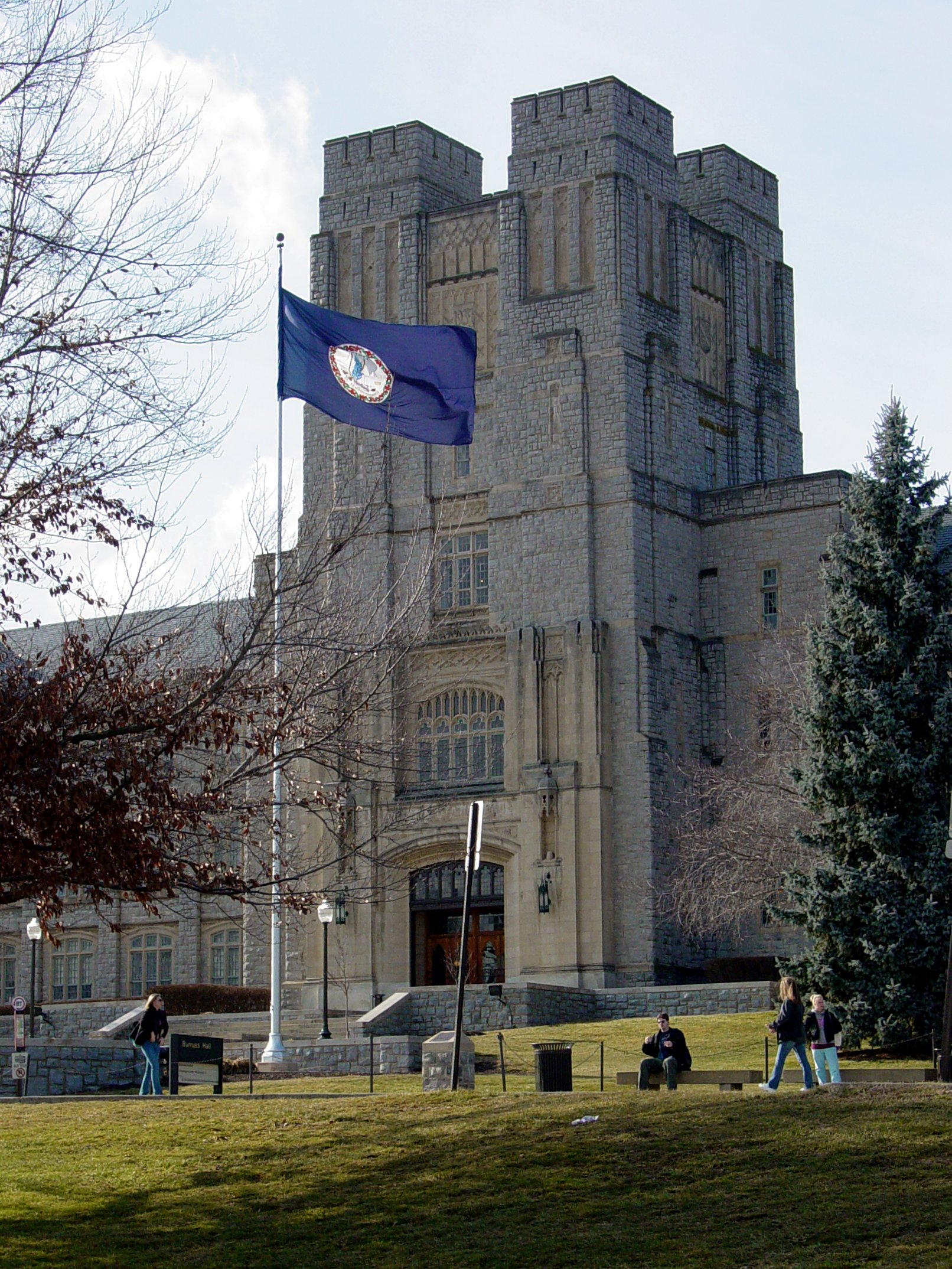
Butera's doctoral research at Virginia Tech (Burruss Hall pictured) led to the creation of Artiphon and, by extension, the Instrument 1.

The Instrument 1 was conceptualised by Mike Butera, a fiddle (violin) player from Nashville, Tennessee. He holds a PhD in sound studies from Virginia Tech and had previously researched the relationship between music listening and technology. Butera, along with Jacob Gordon, is the co-founder of Artiphon, a Nashville-based startup company that was founded in 2011 off the back of Butera's doctoral research.

The same year that Artiphon was founded, Butera had the idea of creating a "universal musical instrument" following a growing frustration with music software interfaces. While jamming with some of his friends at a Nashville dinner party, Butera noticed that people were using mobile devices to produce music. This led him to consider the ergonomics of musicians having their "fingers and hands contorted around a device that just begged to be dropped". This in turn led to the creation of the Instrument 1, which was Artiphon's first project. According to Butera, the Instrument 1's name was chosen to make the device a clean slate for the ideas of its user, saying in a conversation with Mic:

We chose the name INSTRUMENT 1 partly because we want people to approach it as a blank creative canvas [...] We envision musical multi-instruments that can flexibly adapt to however you want to play.

== Production and release ==
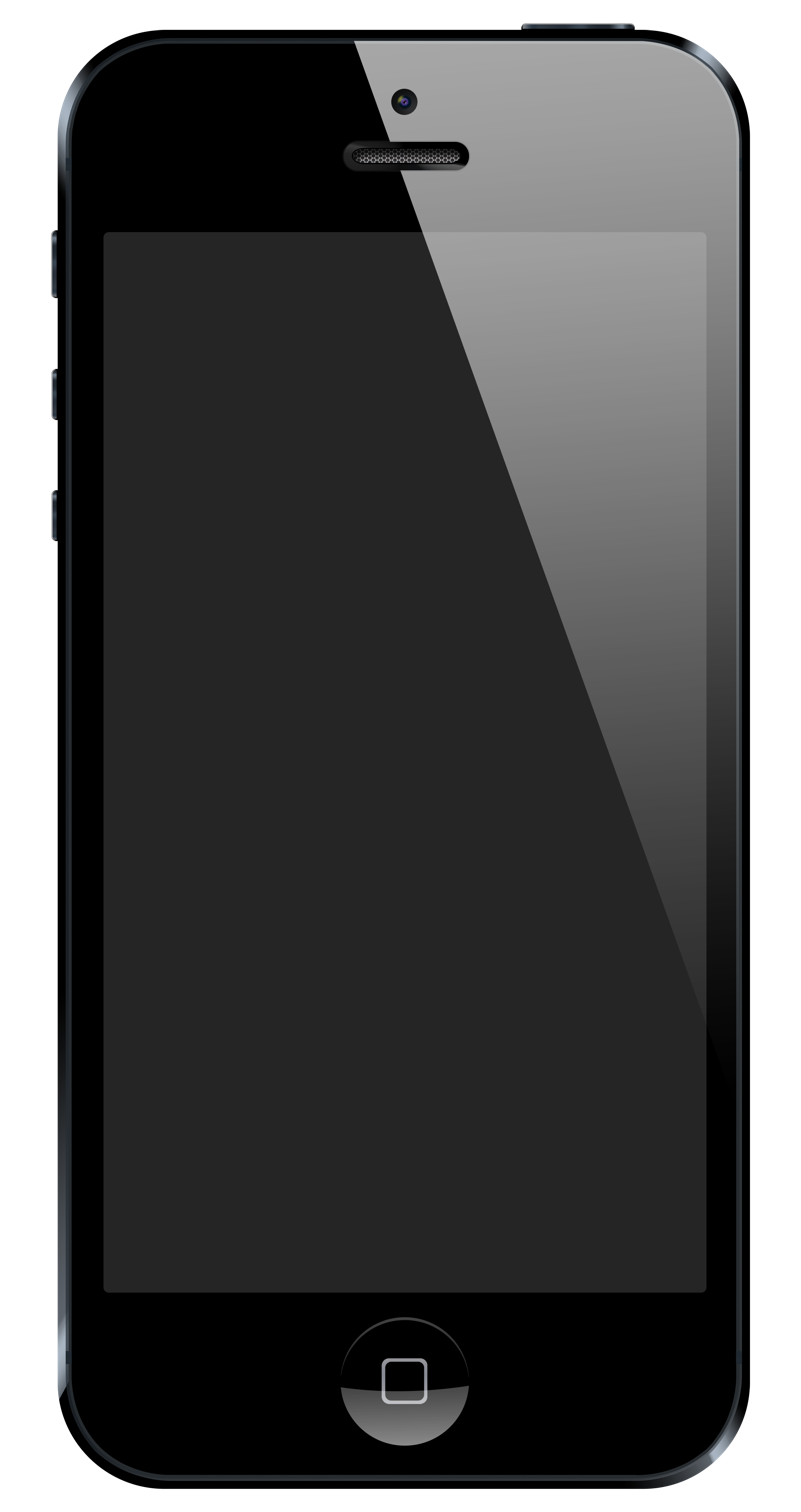
The first prototypes of the Instrument 1 were made to fit the iPhone 5 (left) and iPod Touch (right).

The Instrument 1 was heavily prototyped before its release. It was announced in 2013, following teaser images uploaded of a prototype design in December 2012. The third prototype designed was exhibited at the CES and NAMM shows the same year. This prototype of the Instrument 1 was hand-built from bamboo and various African hardwoods in partnership with a local firm, Cumberland Architectural Millwork. This design featured a dedicated docking station for the iPhone 5 or iPod Touch. The speakers of this design were commented on by testers, including James True of Engadget, who liked their "impressive 30W onboard sound". This prototype was the subject of a beta test in February 2014, with priority given to local testers around Nashville. Artiphon's announcement calling for beta testers read:

Artiphon is looking for beta testers with skills ranging from beginner to advanced, and styles ranging from traditional to experimental. If you have a passion for exploring new technology and being part of the development process, consider filling out the application.

Following feedback gathered from the beta test, the Instrument 1 underwent a year-long redesign. The redesign made the device more compact and increased compatibility with external software. It was during this period that the materials making up the Instrument 1 changed from wood and bamboo to plastic and rubber. This final design was the sixth revision made to the Instrument 1.

=== Kickstarter ===
In 2015, the Instrument 1 was the subject of a successful Kickstarter campaign. Pledges started at $349 for the basic model, with the wood-backed Nashville edition requiring a pledge of $899. The campaign's goal was $75,000, which was achieved within six hours of the campaign starting on 3 March. The campaign was launched with the following pitch:

A guitar is designed to be strummed; piano keys are pressed; drum pads are tapped; violins are bowed. But what if a single instrument could be played with any of these techniques?

At the end of the Kickstarter campaign on 12 April, (Note: Some sources say 13 April) the Instrument 1 had achieved $1,319,672 in funding from 3,391 supporters in 70 different countries. This result made it one of the most-successful Kickstarter campaigns related to music ever, and the most successful musical instrument campaign to have taken place on the site. Aside from the Kickstarter campaign, $700,000 in funding was supplied by angel investors.

Shipping of the Instrument 1 began a year later in 2016. In May, Artiphon once again showcased the Instrument 1 at Moogfest 2016 as part of the device's post-Kickstarter launch. By November, the Instrument 1 was available for purchase by the general public. In 2017, Hal Leonard took over distribution of the Instrument 1 in the United States and Canada.

== Design ==
=== Design philosophy ===
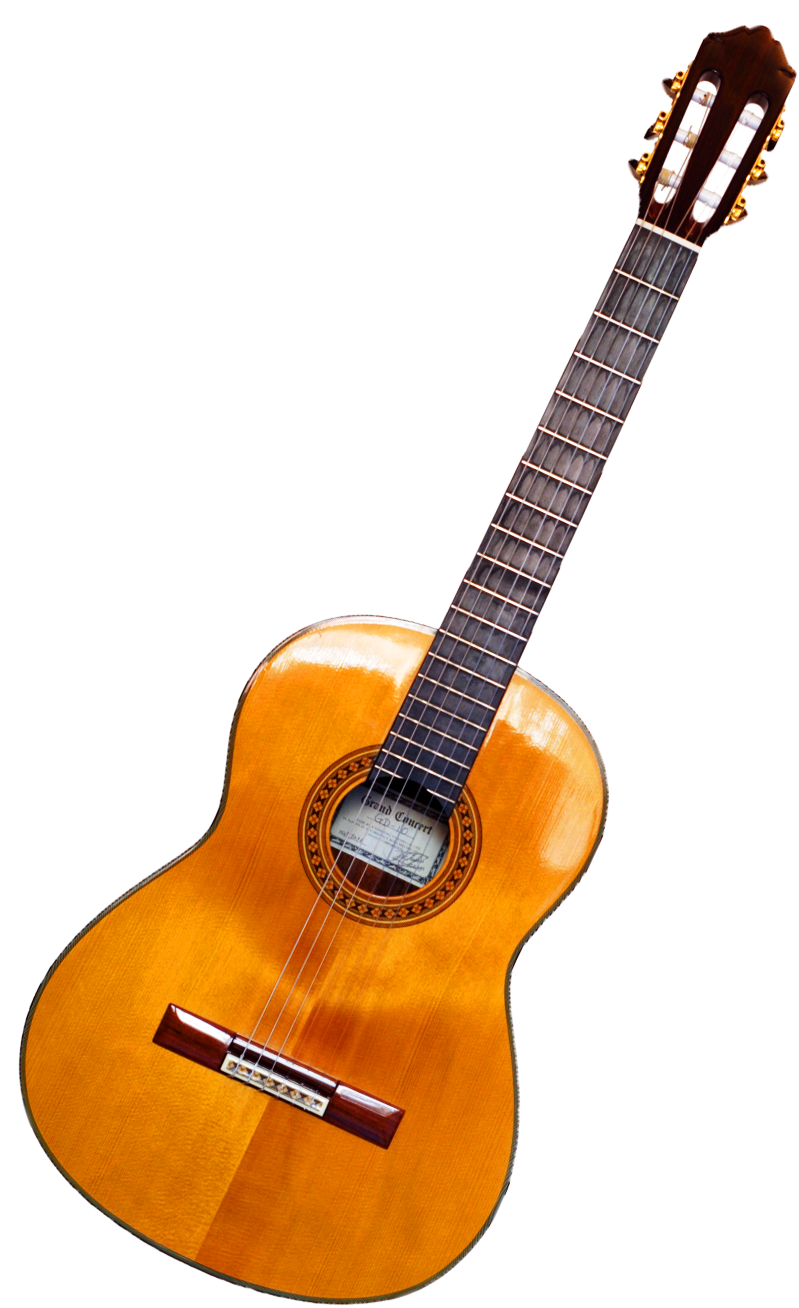
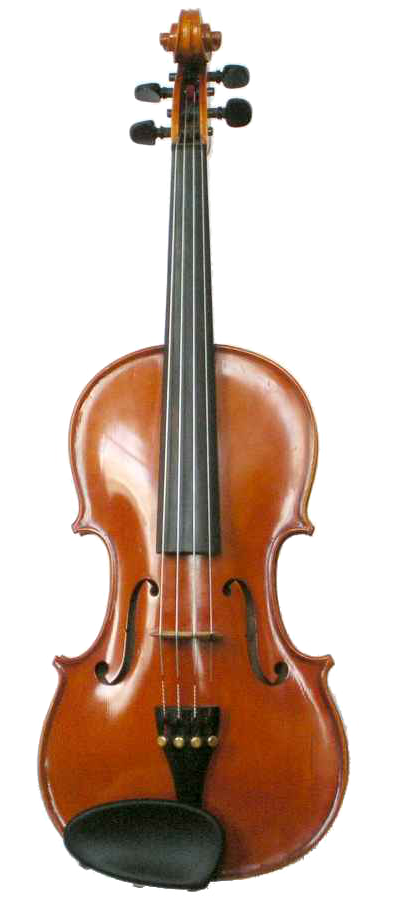
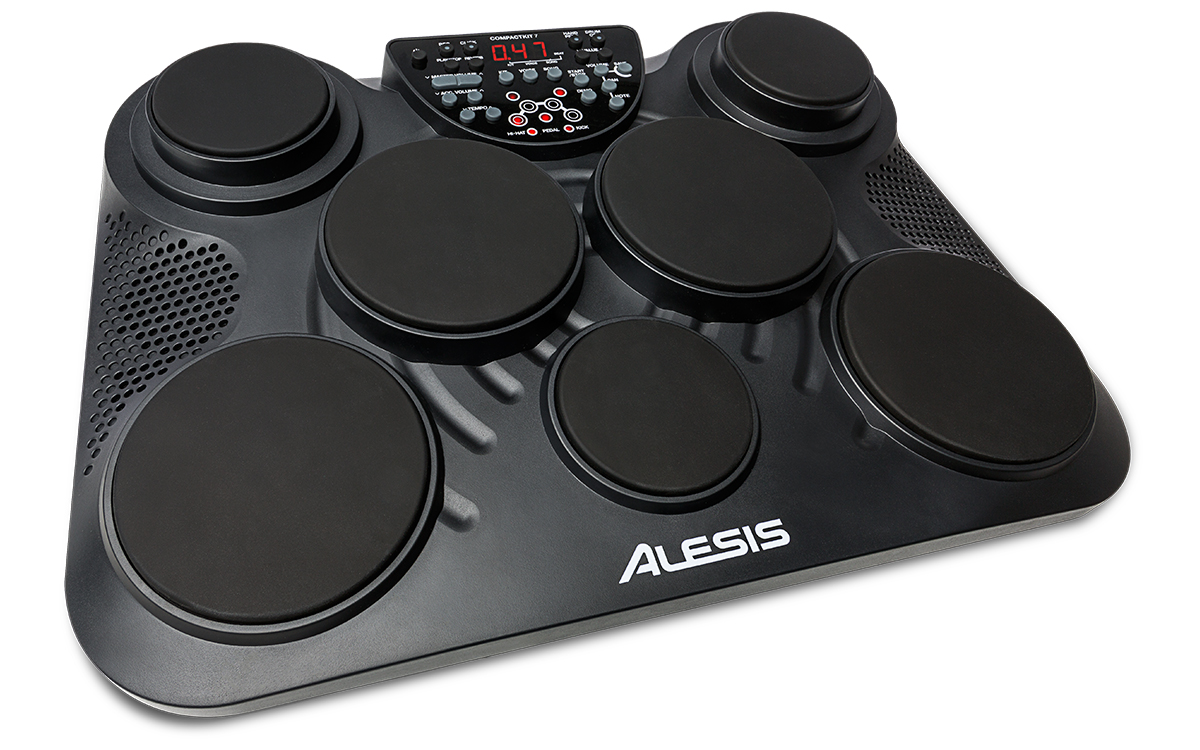
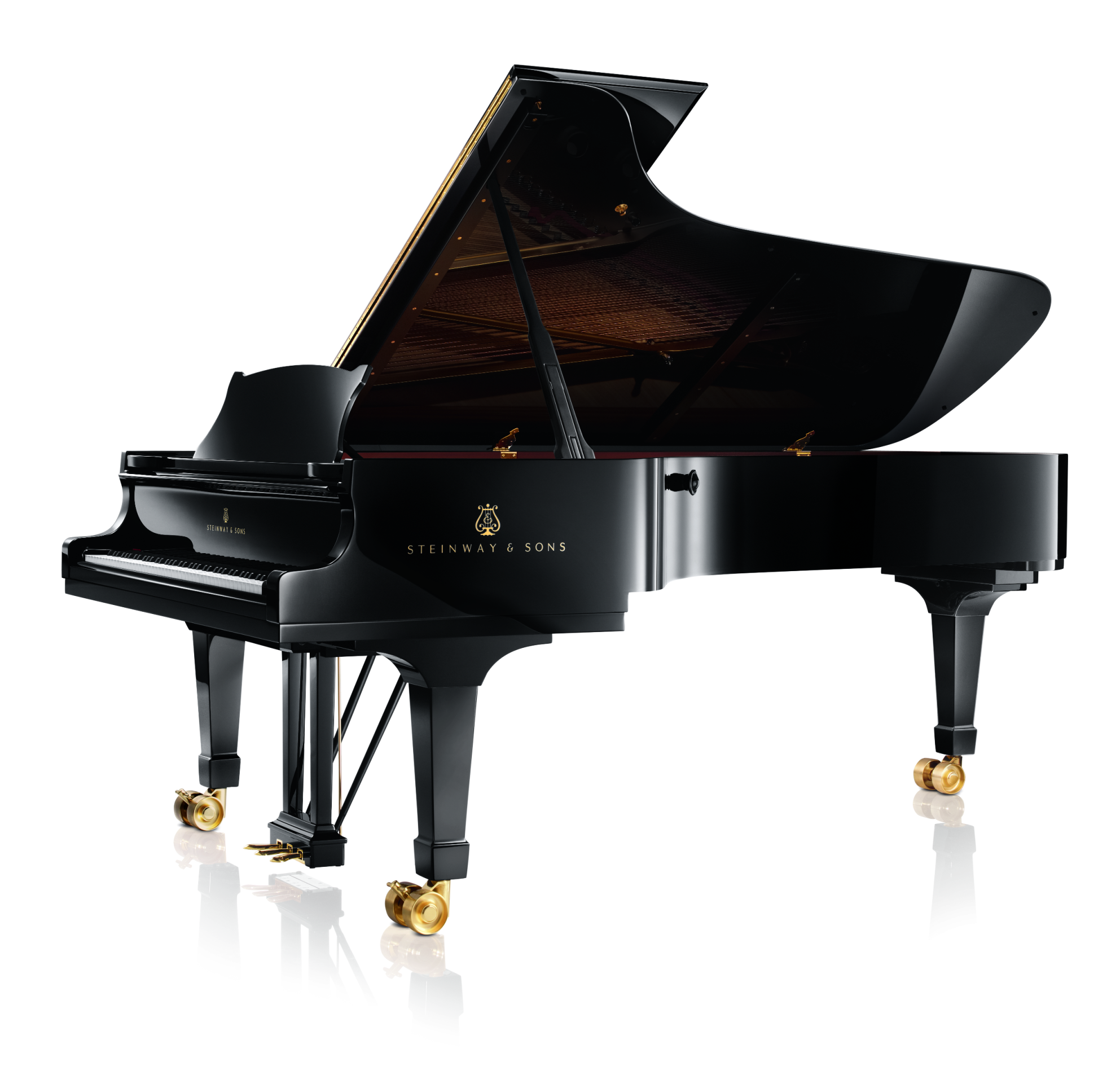
In line with Artiphon's vision of a "universal musical instrument", the Instrument 1 can be played like a guitar (top left), violin (top right), drum pad (bottom left) and piano (bottom right).

Butera and other Artiphon employees have spoken about the design philosophy behind the Instrument 1. The Instrument 1 is Artiphon's attempt at creating a "universal instrument": one that can be played according to the wishes of its user. It was also made to be accessible: with the Instrument 1, Butera wanted to address the learning curve of standard instruments. To do this, Butera imagined an instrument that was "not just a guitar, or a violin, a keyboard or drum machine", but an instrument that could be experimented with and "played with any of these techniques".

=== Overall design ===
The Instrument 1 has four basic instrument configurations: guitar, violin, drum, and piano. It is controlled through a polyphonic touch-sensitive plate, which can act as a set of 12 drum pads, a keyboard, or fingerboard/fretboard. The plate is divided into 72 areas distributed across six "strings", in divisions representing octaves. The touch-plate is velocity and pressure-sensitive (using force-sensing resistors), and capable of polyphonic aftertouch. The Instrument 1 also has a bridge at the end of the touch-plate, which allows the user to pluck, strum and bow the strings. The bridge can be bypassed using a "tap mode". On each end of the touch-plate are speakers, the volume of which are controlled by a volume dial. Also present is a pair of buttons representing a capo, which are used to transpose the device.

The Instrument 1 is a controller that supports the MIDI technical standard. It is capable of MIDI Polyphonic Expression (MPE). It cannot produce sound on its own, only control external devices. It uses a mini USB output, or lightning connector for Apple devices, to connect to third-party music software such as GarageBand. The Instrument 1 also has its own companion app which can be used to fine-tune the instrument settings, or create new instrument configurations. The Instrument 1 also has connections for headphones and microphones.

The Instrument 1 comes in three variants: black, white and the Nashville edition, which has a wooden back. The device is mainly composed of plastic and rubber. It is 60 centimetres (24 in) long and weighs less than two pounds (0.91 kg). The design of the Instrument 1 is patented.

== Reception ==
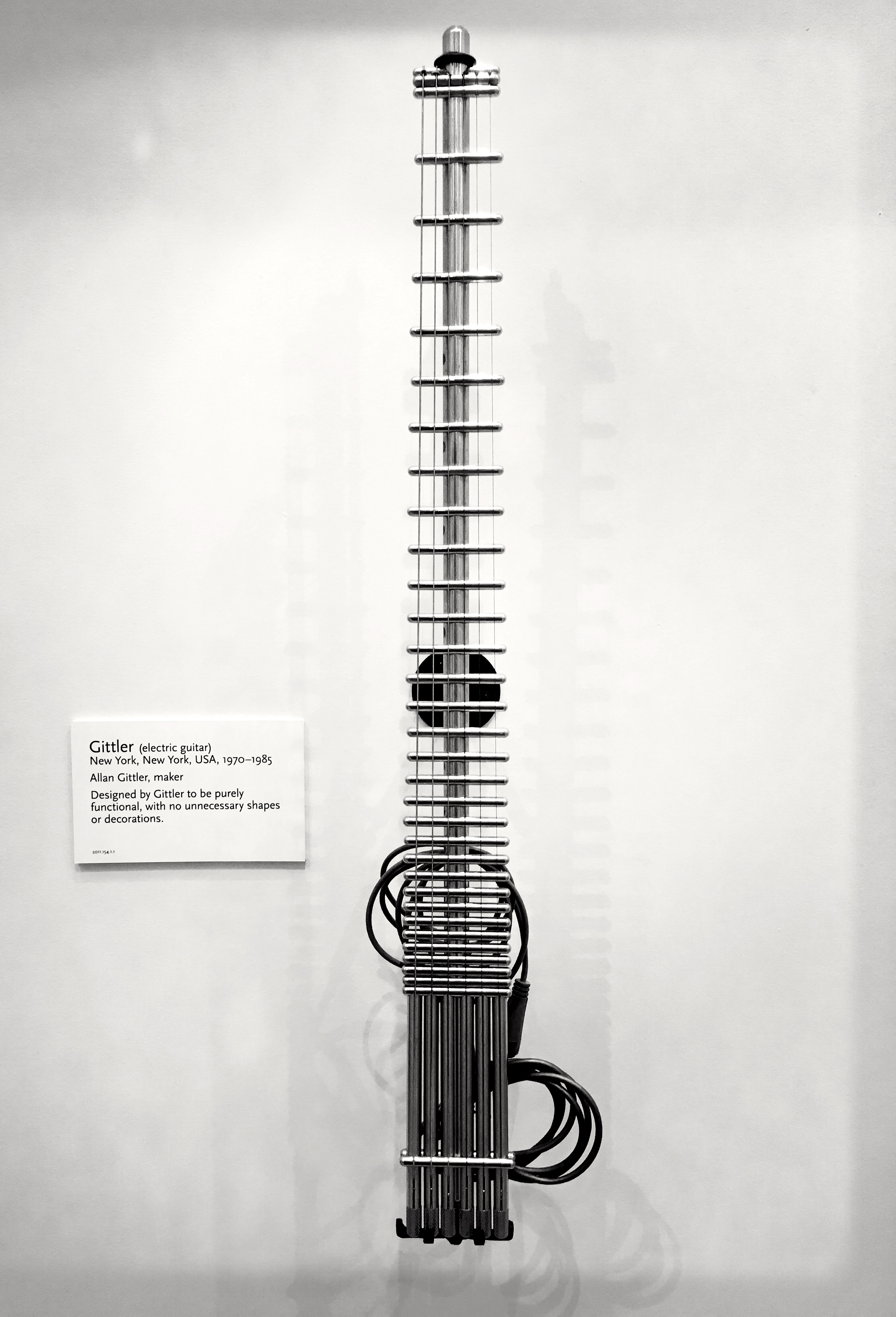
Michelle Starr of CNET commented on the Instrument 1's similarities to the Gittler guitar.

The Instrument 1 was received well by critics and consumers alike. Critics commented on the Instrument 1's realistic and natural feel while playing. To this end, comparisons were made to other "realistic" digital instruments, such as the Roland V-Drums and Yamaha WX5. A point was made of the Instrument 1's price point; according to Vice, this price allowed the Instrument 1 to do what "Traktor Kontroller S4 did for DJs: break[s] barriers". Michelle Starr of CNET stated that the Instrument 1 bore a resemblance to the experimental Gittler guitar. The device's string-based design also led Jess Bartlet of Earmilk to liken the Instrument 1 to the Suzuki Omnichord, a 1981 instrument with a similar focus on strumming. Bartlet gave the Instrument 1 a positive review, saying that the technology has "immense potential".

In a review of the Instrument 1 published by PCMag, Jordan Minor rated the device four out of five, awarding it an editor's choice award. Minor commented on the playing modes of the Instrument 1 in his review, highlighting the discrepancy between the quality of certain modes. According to Minor, the piano and drum pad modes "fall a bit flat" compared to the guitar and violin modes, although he acknowledged that this was due to the high standard set by the other modes.

=== Awards ===
The Instrument 1 has been the recipient of multiple awards. It was featured in Time's list of the "25 Best Inventions of 2015" in the "For Play" section, alongside the Hackaball, Google Cardboard, Pantelligent and CogniToys Dino. Also in 2015, the Instrument 1 was a finalist in Fast Company's Innovation by Design awards in the Product Design category. When it was exhibited at the 2017 Summer NAMM Show, the Instrument 1 was one of six products to receive a Best in Show award.

In 2019, the Instrument 1 was chosen as a finalist in the AARP Innovation Labs Grand Pitch Finale, a competition made to showcase technology made for elderly people. The competition's theme for 2019 was "solutions focused on addressing social isolation". In the final, held on 16 October, the Instrument 1 came in second place and received a $3,000 cash prize.

== Legacy ==
The Instrument 1 has been used as an instrument for people with physical disabilities, specifically for those with impacted muscle motor control. This includes elderly people with arthritis and other related disabilities. The versatility of Instrument 1 lends itself to this function: the multiple modes available let it suit itself to a specific person's needs.

=== Whole class ensemble teaching ===
From September 2022 to March 2023, multiple units of the Instrument 1 were used by the OHMI Trust in their Inclusive Access to Music-Making project. The project aimed to let primary school children in the United Kingdom with additional needs take part in whole class ensemble teaching. By using the Instrument 1's "tap mode", children are able to play the device with one hand, creating a more accessible instrument than those that are standard, like the violin. In a report on the project, it was found that the 11 units used were mainly played in a horizontal position, rather than vertically. Some children in the study stated that playing the Instrument 1 made them want to continue playing an instrument. The children's teachers found the Instrument 1 made a "huge difference" to certain students.

== Notes, references and sources ==
=== Sources ===
- Arboleda, Edwin (November 2016). The Economic and Social Effects of Reward Based Crowdfunded Technology Projects on the Metropolitan New York Community (PDF) (Masters thesis). Harvard Extension School.
- Booth, Nikki; MacGregor, Elizabeth; Nenadic, Emma (March 2023). Independent Evaluation: Inclusive Access to Music-Making (IAMM) Project (PDF) (Report). Birmingham City University.
- Case, Steve (27 September 2022). "Live-Work-Play". The Rise of the Rest. Avid Reader Press. ISBN 9781982191849.
- Chapin, Cheyanne Maria (May 2020). Adapting instruments, not students: A study of adaptive musical instruments (Honours thesis). University of Northern Iowa.
- Gibbs, Nancy, ed. (30 November 2015). "The 25 Best Inventions of 2015". Time. pp. 63–88. ISSN 0040-781X.
- Graham, Ian; Jackson, Tom (16 July 2020). Carton, Steven (ed.). How Super Cool Tech Works (2nd ed.). London: Dorling Kindersley. ISBN 9780241478523.
- Haruch, Steve (15 October 2020). "Tech of the Town". In Haruch, Steve (ed.). Greetings from New Nashville: How a Sleepy Southern Town Became "It" City. Vanderbilt University Press. pp. 134–149. doi:10.2307/j.ctv161f3nc.18. ISBN 9780826500281. JSTOR j.ctv161f3nc. S2CID 243709619.
- Kane, Mary (December 2019). "New Tech Ideas for Aging Well". Kiplinger's Retirement Report. Vol. 26, no. 12. ISSN 1056-697X.
- Lucas, Alex (17 November 2021). Exploring and Cultivating Connections Within Ecosystems of Inclusive Musicking (PhD thesis). Queen's University Belfast.
- McPherson, Andrew; Morreale, Fabio; Harrison, Jacob (2019). "Musical Instruments for Novices: Comparing NIME, HCI and Crowdfunding Approaches". New Directions in Music and Human-Computer Interaction. Springer Series on Cultural Computing. Springer. pp. 179–212. doi:10.1007/978-3-319-92069-6_12. ISBN 978-3-319-92068-9. S2CID 151068133.
