= Dantalian's Chariot =

British musical group (1967–1968)

- Origin: London, England
- Genres: Psychedelic pop; psychedelic rock
- Years active: 1967–1968
- Labels: EMI, Wooden Hill
- Past members: Zoot Money; Andy Summers; Pat Donaldson; Colin Allen

Dantalian's Chariot were a British psychedelic pop band formed in 1967, led by keyboardist and bandleader Zoot Money, and also featuring Andy Summers (later of The Police). They are best remembered for their single "Madman Running Through the Fields", and for their live performances, which featured early psychedelic light shows. The band would all wear white robes and kaftans in concert, with all of their equipment painted white, to heighten the effect of these light shows. The group disbanded in April 1968, with Money going on to join Eric Burdon & The Animals and Summers joining Soft Machine.

== History ==
In November 1961, George Bruno "Zoot" Money formed the Big Roll Band, playing a mixture of soul, jazz, and R&B. Despite becoming a popular fixture on the London club circuit in the early-to-mid-1960s and releasing two albums on EMI's Columbia label, they had little commercial success. With the burgeoning psychedelic scene rendering the band's blend of jazz and R&B passé, Money split up the Big Roll Band in mid-1967 and formed a new band. This new group comprised Money on keyboards and vocals, Andy Summers on guitar, Pat Donaldson on bass, and Colin Allen on drums. The new band's name, Dantalian's Chariot, was suggested by publicist Jim Ramble, and was derived from references to a devil, Duke Dantalion, in the mediaeval book on witchcraft, The Lesser Key of Solomon. The band made their second live appearance at the Windsor National Blues Festival in August 1967, which also featured the debut public performance of Peter Green's Fleetwood Mac, as well as performances by Nick Mason, Arthur Brown, and Ten Years After. The band rapidly gained a strong live reputation and their light show, which had been brought over from San Francisco, was regarded as one of the best in London at that time. To heighten the effect of the spectacular light show being projected onto them, the musicians would all dress in white robes, with their instruments and equipment also painted white.

From the band's first recording sessions, EMI released the single "Madman Running Through the Fields" in September 1967 on their Columbia label. Money commented, many years later:

"Madman was a description of our personal experiences, and the subsequent self-revelations brought about by hallucinogenics... The verse is the voice of the taker, the one who's dropped the acid, and the chorus is him being observed by a second party - "Isn't that the madman running through the fields?" A puzzled onlooker - much like the audiences at the time."

Despite some critical support, the record failed to reach the UK Singles Chart. However, the song's reputation has grown over the years, prompting journalist Nick James to note in Record Collector magazine that "nowadays, the record is rightly regarded as one of the essential works of the era."

EMI subsequently dropped the band, disapproving of Money's psychedelic direction. Dantalian's Chariot then appeared in the low-budget movie Popdown, directed by Fred Marshall and showcasing several groups from the "Swinging London" scene, including Blossom Toes and The Idle Race. The band subsequently signed to Direction Records, a subsidiary of CBS Records, and began work on their debut LP, which mostly consisted of new songs written by Money and Summers. However, the record label rejected these recordings, and instead put together an album of previously recorded tracks, which they released in 1968 as Transition, crediting the album to Zoot Money as a solo artist, rather than Dantalian's Chariot.

The band broke up in April 1968, with Money joining Eric Burdon & the Animals and various other acts in the following years, and Summers joining Soft Machine, Eric Burdon & The Animals, the Kevin Ayers Band, and subsequently The Police. Drummer Colin Allen went on to play with John Mayall & the Bluesbreakers, Stone The Crows, and Focus, while bassist Pat Donaldson later worked with Sandy Denny, among others.

The song "Madman Running Through the Fields" was covered by Eric Burdon & the Animals while both Zoot Money and Andy Summers were members of the band. The track appeared on the Love Is album which was released in December 1968 by the record company MGM.

In 1996, the album Chariot Rising, featuring ten of the tracks recorded by Dantalian's Chariot in 1967, was released by the Wooden Hill label. Over the years, the song "Madman Running Through the Fields" has appeared on many compilation albums, including Nuggets II: Original Artyfacts from the British Empire and Beyond, 1964–1969, the second box set of the Nuggets series. "Madman Running Through the Fields" appears as number 28 in Record Collector's "100 Greatest Psychedelic Records", a list in chronological order.

== Band members ==
- Zoot Money - keyboards, vocals
- Andy Summers - guitar, sitar
- Pat Donaldson - bass
- Colin Allen - drums

== Discography ==
=== Singles ===
- "Madman Running Through the Fields"/"Sun Came Bursting Through My Cloud" (Columbia (EMI) DB 8260) 1967
- "Madman Running Through the Fields"/"Sun Came Bursting Through My Cloud" (French Columbia (EMI) CF 123) 1967

=== Albums ===
- Chariot Rising (Wooden Hill WHCD005) 1996 (Originally recorded 1967)
