= The Instrumentals =

The Instrumentals may refer to:

- The Instrumentals (T-Pain album)
- The Instrumentals: The Best of the Capitol Years, a compilation album by Leo Kottke
- The Instrumentals: The Best of the Chrysalis Years, a compilation album by Leo Kottke

== See also ==
- Instrumental (disambiguation)
