= XYZ (Andy Summers album) =

Studio album by Andy Summers
- Released: 1987
- Recorded: Summer 1986
- Studio: Devo Studios (Los Angeles, California)
- Genre: Pop, new wave
- Length: 42:22
- Label: MCA
- Producer: David Hentschel; Andy Summers

Andy Summers chronology
Bewitched (1984)	XYZ (1987)	Mysterious Barricades (1988)

XYZ is the first solo album by Andy Summers. Released in 1987, it is to date his only album to feature him on lead vocals, though he performs a wordless vocal on his 1991 album World Gone Strange.

== Background ==
During his tenure with the Police, Summers had worked on a number of outside projects, including two albums of instrumental music with fellow guitarist Robert Fripp and music for films such Down and Out in Beverly Hills and 2010: The Year We Make Contact. Following the official break-up of The Police in 1986, Summers, like his bandmates Sting and Stewart Copeland, embarked on a more ambitious solo career. Summers partnered with producer and musician David Hentschel, known for his work with Genesis. Summers was the first Police member to leave A&M Records, choosing instead to work with MCA. The album was recorded in 1986 at Devo's studio in Los Angeles, California. Many of the songs had been demoed in the Police years and put forward for consideration for Sting to sing on a Police album. Summers took lead vocals himself, and played bass as well as his usual array of guitars. Drum programming was favoured over the use of real drums, a production choice popular in the mid-1980s. The title "XYZ" comes from the middle names of Summers's three children. His daughter Layla (born 1978) has the middle name 'Z', and his twin sons, Maurice and Anton, (born 1987) have the middle names 'X' and 'Y' respectively. The cover portrait is by Anton Corbijn.

"Love is the Strangest Way" was released as a single. The promotional video was inspired by the work of Maya Deren and shot as a short black and white film, with Summers and his love interest desperately trying to meet in a room full of people. Summers commented: "I didn't like any of [The Police] videos. We were always made to look bright, inoffensive and appealing. As videos progressed, they started to move away from that: they got hipper, people started using Super 8 and handheld techniques, and everything got darker and more interesting."

Another track, "Carry Me Back Home" (5:04), was recorded during the XYZ sessions for the soundtrack of the film Band of the Hand and released on the B-side of the 12-inch version of the "Love is the Strangest Way" single. Charlotte Caffey, from the new-wave band the Go-Gos, did not play in the album but she co-authored the title track with Summers and Hentschel and is acknowledged for her support in the credits.

== Reception ==
Summers put together a six-piece band and toured extensively to promote the album, augmenting the set list with Police material such as "Tea in the Sahara" and "Omega Man", the latter of which had never been played live by The Police. Both the single and the album failed to chart, prompting Summers, for most of his future career, to return to the kind of instrumental music he had explored on the two albums he had recorded with Robert Fripp.

== Track listing ==
All tracks are written by Andy Summers, except where noted.

No.	Title	Writer(s)	Length
1.	"Love Is the Strangest Way"		4:20
2.	"How Many Days"	lyrics: Summers; music: Summers, David Hentschel	5:21
3.	"Almost There"		4:30
4.	"Eyes of a Stranger"		4:47
5.	"The Change"		2:53
6.	"Scary Voices"		4:37
7.	"Nowhere"	lyrics: Summers; music: Summers, Hentschel	4:35
8.	"XYZ"	lyrics: Summers; music: Summers, Hentschel, Charlotte Caffey	2:46
9.	"The Only Road"		3:40
10.	"Hold Me"	lyrics: Summers; music: Summers, Hentschel	4:48

== Personnel ==
- Andy Summers – vocals, guitars, bass
- David Hentschel – keyboards, drum programming
- Chris Childs – bass (4)
- Abraham Laboriel – bass (6)
- Rick May – bass (10)
- Michael G. Fisher – percussion (1, 3, 7)
- Nan Vernon – vocals (1–3), backing vocals (4)
- Oren, Julia, and Maxine Waters – backing vocals (2, 7, 10)
- Greta Gold – additional backing vocals (4)

Production

- Andy Summers – producer
- David Hentschel – producer, mixing
- Bob Casale – mixing, recording engineer
- Dennis Smith – technical assistance
- Anton Corbijn – photography
- Andrew Ellis – art direction
- Richard Evans – art direction

== Charts ==
=== Singles ===
Year	Single	Chart	Position
1987	"Love Is the Strangest Way"	Italy Airplay (Music & Media)	18
