= Instrumental (disambiguation) =

An instrumental is a musical composition or recording without vocals.

Instrumental(s) may also refer to:

== Music ==
- "Instrumental" (My Bloody Valentine song), 1988
- "Instrumental", a song by Black Country, New Road from the deluxe version of Ants from Up There, 2022
- "Instrumental", an instrumental by Faith No More from Who Cares a Lot? The Greatest Hits, 1998
- "Instrumental", the name of two songs from the Microphones' The Glow Pt. 2, 2001
- "Instrumental", an instrumental by Sajid–Wajid, from the 2009 Indian film Dhoondte Reh Jaaoge

=== Albums ===
- Instrumentals (Adrianne Lenker album), 2020
- Instrumentals (Mouse on Mars album), 1997
- Instrumentals (Nels Cline Singers album), 2002
- Instrumentals (The Pharcyde album), 2005
- Instrumentals (Ricky Skaggs and Kentucky Thunder album), 2006
- Instrumentals (mixtape), by Clams Casino, 2011
- Instrumentals, by Lil Rob, 2005
- Instrumentals Vol. 1, by Necro, 2001

== Other uses ==
- Instrumental case, a grammatical case
- Instrumental value, one of two poles of an ancient dichotomy
- Instrumental variable, in statistics

== See also ==
- Instrumental Album: The Rising Tied, a 2005 album by Fort Minor
- Instrumental Collection: The Shrapnel Years, a 2006 album by Richie Kotzen
- The Instrumentals (disambiguation)
- Instrumentality (disambiguation)
- Instrument (disambiguation)
