= Andy Summers =

English guitarist (born 1942)

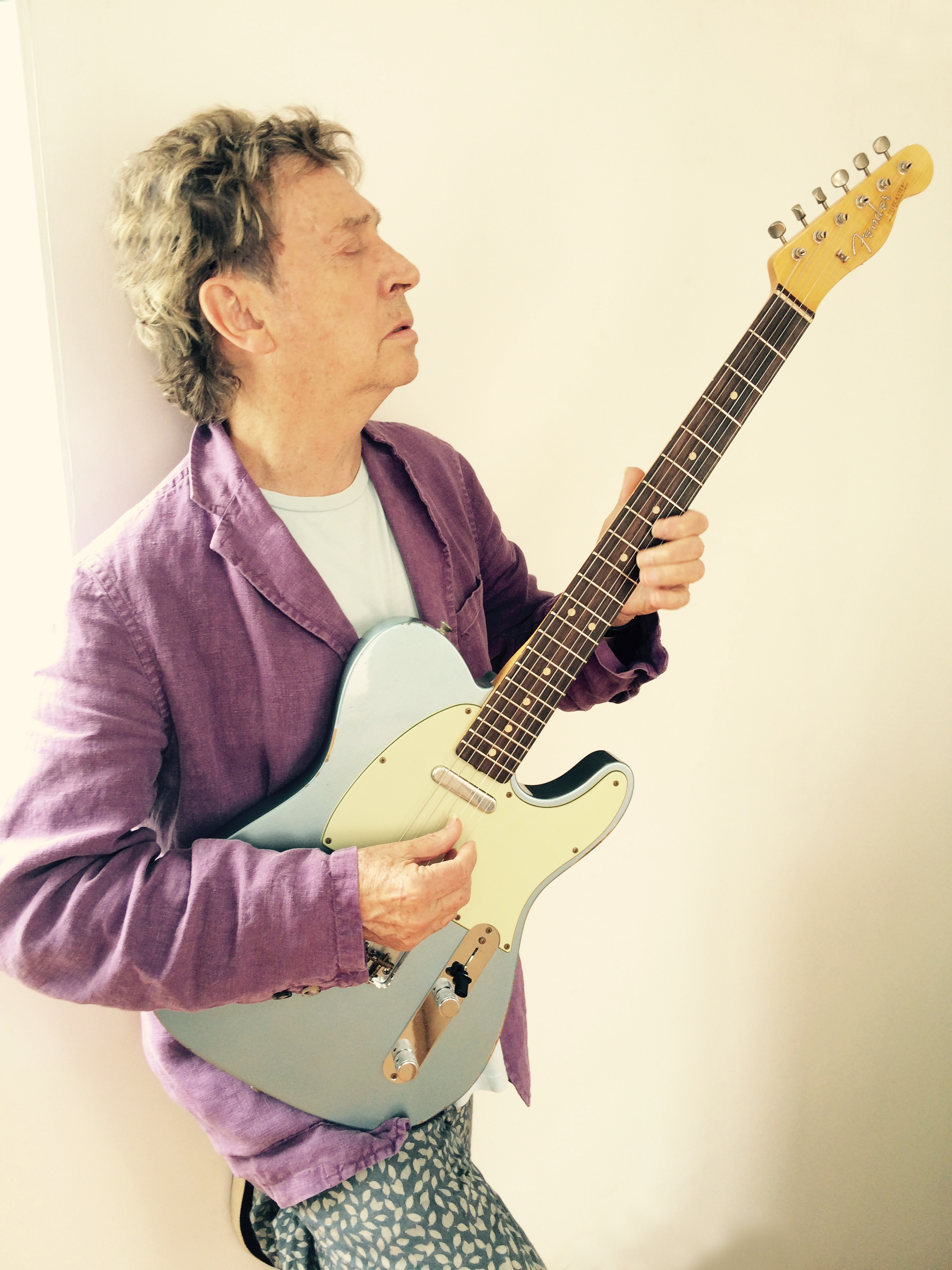
- Summers in 2015

Background information
- Born: Andrew James Summers; 31 December 1942 (age 83); Poulton-le-Fylde, Lancashire, England
- Origin: Bournemouth, Hampshire, England
- Genres: Rock; pop; jazz
- Occupations: Guitarist, photographer
- Years active: 1961–present
- Labels: A&M; Private Music; RCA Victor
- Formerly of: Call the Police; Circa Zero; The Police; Strontium 90; Dantalian's Chariot; Soft Machine; Eric Burdon and The Animals; Zoot Money's Big Roll Band
- Website: andysummers.com

Andrew James Summers (born 31 December 1942) is an English guitarist best known as a member of the rock band the Police. Prior to joining the Police, Summers had been a member of several bands during the 1960s, including Zoot Money's Big Roll Band, Dantalian's Chariot, Soft Machine, and the Animals. He spent the first half of the 1970s furthering his musical education, before returning to professional work in 1975, eventually joining the Police two years later. Summers has also recorded solo albums, collaborated with other musicians (including two albums with Robert Fripp during the 1980s), composed film scores, written fiction, and exhibited his photography in galleries. He was inducted into the Rock and Roll Hall of Fame as a member of the Police in 2003.

== Early life ==
Andrew James Summers was born in Poulton-le-Fylde, Lancashire, England, on 31 December 1942.

During his childhood, his family moved to Bournemouth, which was then in Hampshire. After several years of piano lessons, he took up the guitar at the age of 10. Before being enraptured with the guitar, Summers described himself as an outdoorsy kid growing up in rural England.

In his teens, he saw a concert by Thelonious Monk and Dizzy Gillespie in London that left a lasting impression. By 16, he was playing in local clubs, and by 19, he had moved to London with his friend Zoot Money to form Zoot Money's Big Roll Band. In his teens he played jazz guitar and was influenced by Kenny Burrell, Jimmy Raney, Wes Montgomery, Charles Mingus, and Miles Davis.

== Musical career ==
=== Pre-Police career ===
Summers' professional career began in the mid-1960s in London as guitarist for the British rhythm and blues band Zoot Money's Big Roll Band, which eventually came under the influence of the psychedelic scene and evolved into the acid rock group Dantalian's Chariot. In September 1966, Summers was the first guitarist encountered by Jimi Hendrix after landing in the UK. The young Summers is portrayed in fiction as one of the "two main love interests" in Jenny Fabian and Johnny Byrne's 1969 book Groupie, in which he is given the pseudonym "Davey".

After the demise of Dantalian's Chariot, Summers joined Soft Machine for three months in the summer of 1968 and toured the United States. For a brief time in 1968, he was a member of the Animals, then known as Eric Burdon and the Animals, with whom he recorded one album, Love Is. The album features a recording of Traffic's "Coloured Rain", which includes a 4 minute and 15 second guitar solo by Summers. The LP also included a reworked version of Dantalian's Chariot's sole single "Madman Running Through the Fields".

After five years in Los Angeles, mostly spent studying classical guitar and composition in the music programme at California State University, Northridge, from which he graduated in 1972, he returned to London with his American girlfriend, Kate Lunken.

In London Summers recorded and toured with acts including Kevin Coyne, Jon Lord, Joan Armatrading, David Essex, Neil Sedaka and Kevin Ayers. In October 1975 he participated in an orchestral rendition of Mike Oldfield's Tubular Bells.

In 1977 Summers was invited by ex-Gong bassist Mike Howlett to join his band Strontium 90, but was soon coaxed away by future Police bandmates Sting and Stewart Copeland. According to Copeland, Summers met him and Sting when the three worked together as session musicians. Later, when Summers by chance encountered Copeland on the London Underground the two went for coffee, and Summers told Copeland, "Stewart, you and that bass player (Sting), you've got something. But you need me in the band - and I accept."

=== The Police ===
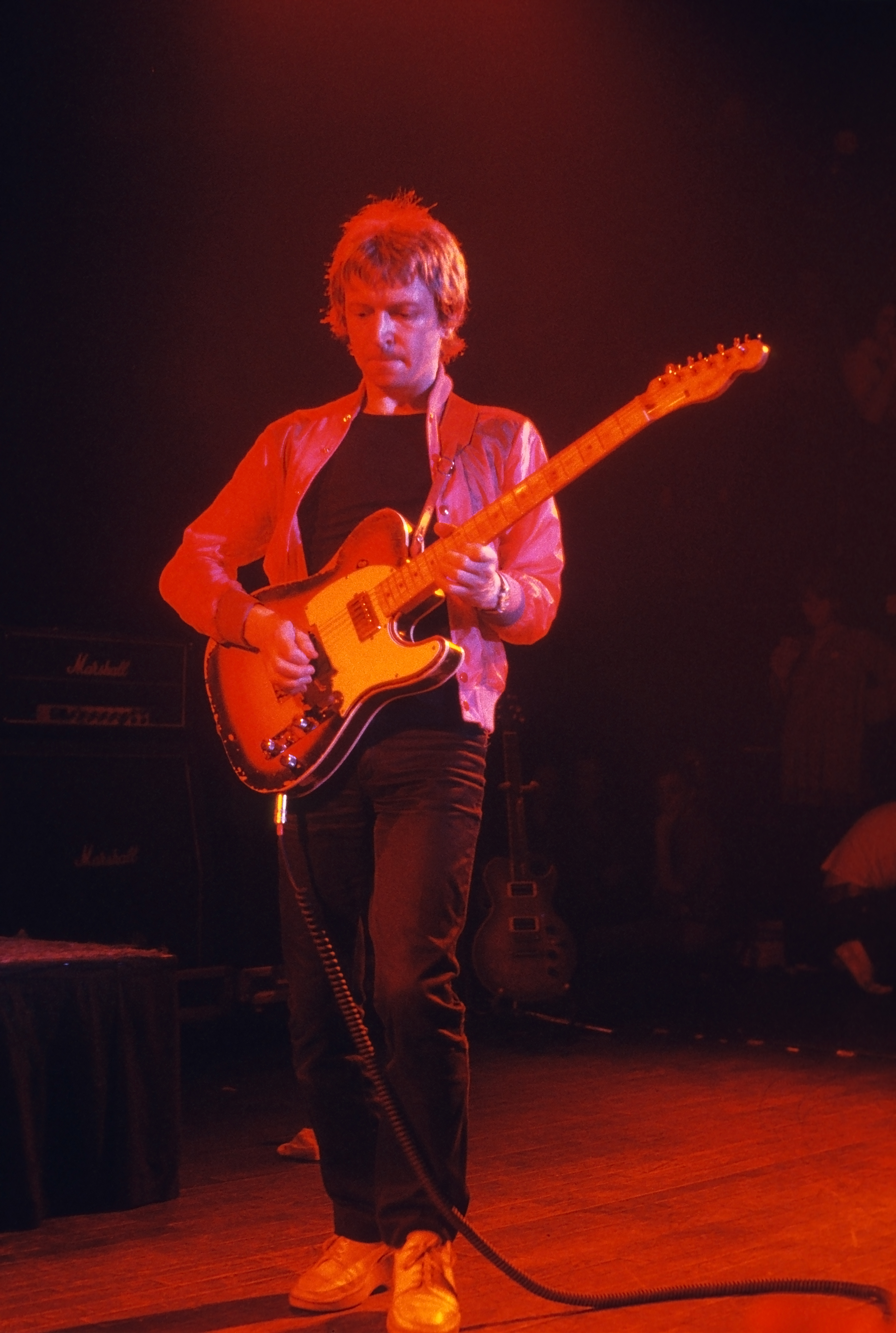
Summers performing in 1979

Summers achieved international fame as the guitarist for the Police, which he joined in 1977, eventually replacing original guitarist Henry Padovani. Emerging from London's punk scene, the Police gained international renown with many hit songs, including "Message in a Bottle", "Roxanne", "Don't Stand So Close to Me", "Every Breath You Take", and "Every Little Thing She Does is Magic". During his time with the band, Summers twice won a Grammy Award for Best Rock Instrumental Performance, first in 1981 for "Reggatta de Blanc" (written with Copeland and Sting) and in 1982 for "Behind My Camel".

Although Sting was the lead singer of the band, Summers occasionally contributed lead vocals, as in "Be My Girl/Sally" (1978), "Friends" (1980), "Mother" (1983), and "Someone to Talk To" (1983). Other notable Summers compositions from this period are "Omegaman" (which would have been released as the debut single from the 1981 Ghost in the Machine album had Sting not objected), "Shambelle" (1981), "Once Upon a Daydream," and "Murder by Numbers" both co-written with Sting (both 1983). In early 1984, after seven years together and record sales around 80 million, the Police disbanded.

Summers wrote the guitar riff for "Every Breath You Take", though was not given a songwriting credit. It was recorded in one take with his 1961 Fender Stratocaster during the Synchronicity sessions. The song was number one for eight weeks. Sting won the 1983 Grammy Award for Song of the Year, and the Police won Best Pop Performance by a Duo Or Group With Vocal for this song. Summers provides an account of the session in his memoir, One Train Later.

As a member of the Police, Summers created a trademark guitar sound, which relied heavily on a chorus effect. He explained in 2017 how the sound came about:

"I created it sort of out of necessity; my mission was 'We're going to play for two hours each night as a trio,' so I wanted to have this fantastic, coloured guitar sound that was different for every song. So, I used the Echoplex, then a chorus, and a few other pedals…envelope filters. As we went on, I acquired more stuff and got a Pete Cornish board, but what was driving it was to invade and push the edge of what the guitar was supposed to sound like, and make it really interesting over a show. So, it wasn't just one straight sound all the time. I could move it around. And it was appreciated by many millions of people (laughs). Of course, it's very tired and a bit 'retro' now; I'm not very keen on it anymore. But in those days it was new, fresh, and exciting."

=== Post-Police ===
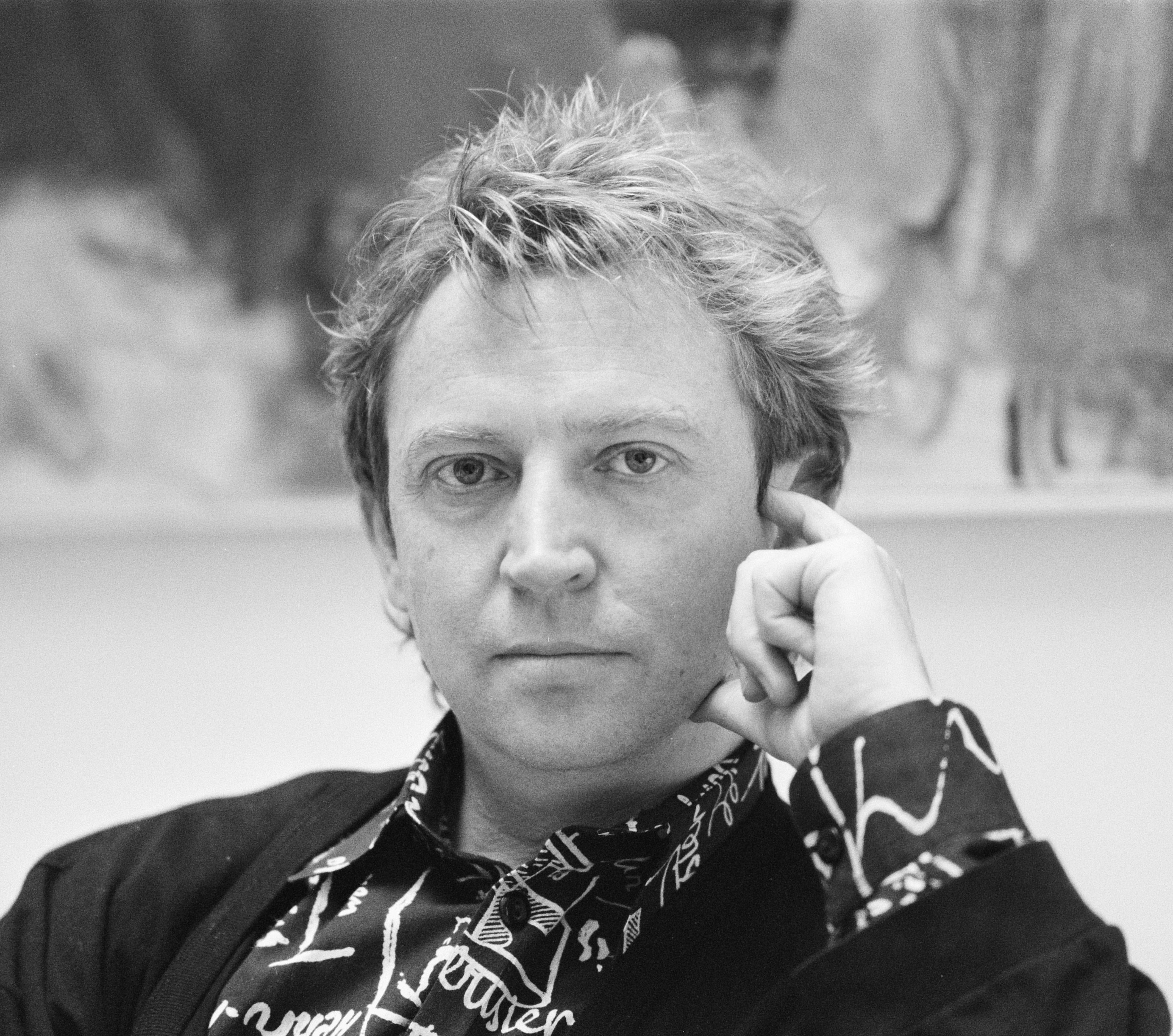
Summers in 1989

Summers's solo career has included recording, touring, composing for films (including Down and Out in Beverly Hills and Weekend at Bernie's), and exhibiting his photography in art galleries around the world.

He recorded the duet albums I Advance Masked (1982) and Bewitched (1984) with guitarist Robert Fripp of King Crimson, as well as duet albums with Victor Biglione, John Etheridge, and Benjamin Verdery. His solo debut album, XYZ, was released in 1987 and is the only noninstrumental album in his solo catalogue. Although it included pop material, such as the single "Love is the Strangest Way", it failed to dent the charts. In 1987, Sting invited Summers to perform on his second album ...Nothing Like the Sun, a favour the singer returned by playing bass on Charming Snakes (1990) and later contributing vocals to "'Round Midnight" on Summers' tribute album to Thelonious Monk, Green Chimneys, in 1999. In the mid-1990s Summers briefly returned to a more rock-oriented sound with Synesthesia (1995) and The Last Dance of Mr X (1997) before recording a string of jazz albums. He also participated in the formation of Animal Logic. In 1992, he led the house band (credited as musical director) for The Dennis Miller Show.

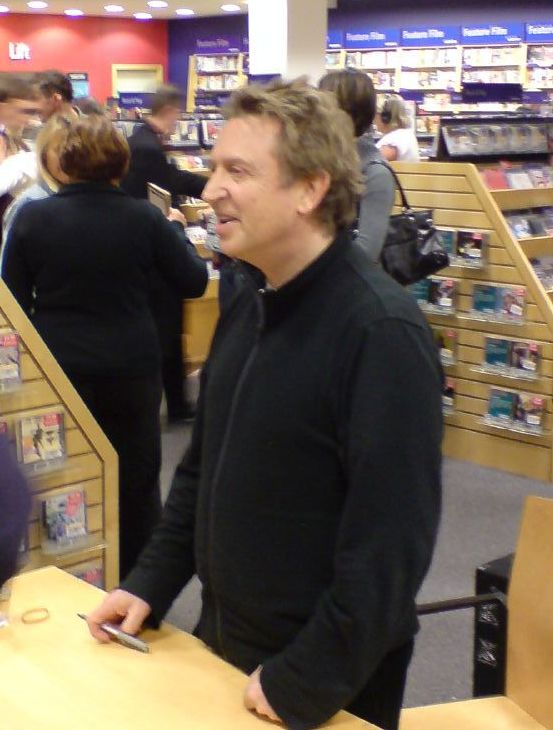
Summers in 2006

=== The Police reunion ===
During the 2007 Grammy Awards show, the Police played "Roxanne" and subsequently announced that they would be going on tour. The Police Reunion Tour began in Vancouver, Canada, on 28 May 2007 and continued until August 2008, becoming the third-highest-grossing tour of all time.

=== Circa Zero ===
In August 2013, Summers announced he had formed the band Circa Zero with Rob Giles from the Rescues. Originally, drummer Emmanuelle Caplette was also a member of the band. Their debut show was 25 July 2013 at the El Rey Theatre in Los Angeles. The band's debut album, Circus Hero, was released 25 March 2014. It is titled after a malapropism of the band's name made by a radio disc jockey during an interview of Summers.

=== Call the Police ===
In March 2017, Summers announced he had formed Call the Police, a Police tribute band, with two Brazilian musicians, Rodrigo Santos (Barão Vermelho) on bass guitar and vocals and Joao Barone (Os Paralamas do Sucesso) on drums.

== Awards and honours ==
- Grammy Award, Best Rock Instrumental, "Reggatta de Blanc", 1981
- Grammy Award, Best Rock Instrumental, "Behind My Camel", 1982
- Rock and Roll Hall of Fame induction with the Police, 2003
- Chevalier of the Ordre des Arts et des Lettres, with the Police, 2007
- Honorary doctorate, Bournemouth University, 2008
- Hall of Fame, Guitar Player magazine
- Vote number one pop guitarist, five years, Guitar Player magazine
- Guiding Light Award, Progressive Music Awards, 2016
- 85th greatest guitarist of all time in 2015, 250th in 2023 by Rolling Stone magazine
- Lifetime Achievement Award, Gibson Guitar Awards, 2000
- Lifetime Achievement Award, Roland and BOSS, 2017
- One Train Later (2006) was voted music book of the year by Mojo and was turned into the 2012 documentary Can't Stand Losing You: Surviving the Police. The documentary was released on DVD in July 2015.

== Personal life ==
As of 2022, Summers resides in Santa Monica, California, United States with his wife and family.

== Equipment ==
Summers’ primary guitar throughout the Police's peak years was a unique 1963 Fender Telecaster Custom with two significant modifications: an onboard preamp and a Gibson PAF in the neck position.

In the early days of the Police he started off with the Telecaster, Fender Twin Reverb and an MXR Phase 90. As the Police got more money, Andy had commissioned a custom-built effects pedalboard by Pete Cornish, which was assembled in early 1979 and had mostly MXR effects with an Electro-Harmonix Electric Mistress and Musitronics Mu-Tron III envelope follower. In addition to the pedalboard he had a vintage 1960s Maestro Echoplex EP-2 for delay effects. He also recorded in the studio with a Roland Bolt amplifier.

== Discography ==
=== Solo albums ===
- XYZ (MCA, 1987)
- Mysterious Barricades (Private Music, 1988)
- The Golden Wire (Private, 1989)
- Charming Snakes (Private, 1990)
- World Gone Strange (Private, 1991)
- Synaesthesia (CMP, 1995)
- The Last Dance of Mr. X (BMG/RCA Victor, 1997)
- Green Chimneys: The Music of Thelonious Monk (BMG Classics/RCA Victor, 1999)
- Peggy's Blue Skylight (BMG Classics/RCA Victor, 2000)
- Earth + Sky (Golden Wire, 2003)
- Metal Dog (Flickering Shadow, 2015)
- Triboluminescence (Flickering Shadow, 2017)
- Harmonics of the Night (Flickering Shadow, 2021)
- Vertiginous Canyons (Blue Cloud Music, 2024)

=== Collaborations ===
- I Advance Masked with Robert Fripp (A&M, 1982)
- Bewitched with Robert Fripp (A&M, 1984)
- Invisible Threads with John Etheridge (Mesa, 1993)
- Strings of Desire with Victor Biglione (R.A.R.E., 1998)
- Ringo Starr and his All Starr Band with Jack Bruce (Guest, 2000)
- Splendid Brazil with Victor Biglione (R.A.R.E., 2005)
- First You Build a Cloud with Ben Verdery (R.A.R.E., 2007)
- Fundamental with Fernanda Takai (Deck, 2012)

=== Film soundtracks ===
- The Wild Life (MCA, 1984)
- 2010 (A&M, 1984)
- Band of the Hand (1985)
- Down and Out in Beverly Hills (MCA, 1986)
- End of the Line (1987)
- Weekend at Bernie's (Arista, 1989)
- The Craft (Columbia, 1996)

=== Singles ===
- "I Advance Masked"/"Hardy Country" with Robert Fripp (1982)
- "Parade"/"Train" with Robert Fripp (1984)
- "2010"/"To Hal and Back" (1984)
- "Love is the Strangest Way"/"Nowhere" (1987)
- "Bring on the Night" (Police cover) with 40 Fingers (2022)

=== As band member ===
With Circa Zero

- Circus Hero (429, 2014)

With The Police

- Outlandos d'Amour (1978)
- Reggatta de Blanc (1979)
- Zenyatta Mondatta (1980)
- Ghost in the Machine (1981)
- Brimstone and Treacle (1982)
- Synchronicity (1983)
- Every Breath You Take: The Singles (1986)
- Message in a Box: The Complete Recordings (1993)
- Live! (1995)
- The Police (2007)
- Certifiable: Live in Buenos Aires (2008)

With Eric Burdon and the Animals

- Love Is (1968)

With Kevin Ayers

- Yes We Have No Mañanas (So Get Your Mañanas Today) (EMI/Harvest, 1976)
- First Show in the Appearance Business: The BBC Sessions 1973–1976 (Strange Fruit 1996)
- Too Old to Die Young: BBC Live 1972–1976 (Hux 1998)

With Kevin Coyne

- Matching Head and Feet (Virgin, 1975)
- Heartburn (Virgin, 1976)
- In Living Black and White (Virgin, 1976)
- Sign of the Times (Virgin, 1994)
- On Air (Tradition & Moderne, 2008)

With Dantalian's Chariot

- Chariot Rising (Wooden Hill, 1996)

With Eberhard Schoener

- The Book (Ariola 1977)
- Trance-Formation (Harvest/EMI Electrola 1977)
- Video Magic (Harvest, 1978)
- Flashback (Harvest, 1979)

With Strontium 90

- Police Academy (Pangaea, 1997)

With Zoot Money's Big Roll Band

- It Should Have Been Me (1965)
- Zoot! (Columbia, 1966)
- Transition (1968)
- Were You There? (Indigo, 1999)
- Fully Clothed & Naked (Indigo, 2000)

=== As guest ===
- Joan Armatrading, Back to the Night (A&M, 1975)
- Manuel Barrueco, Nylon & Steel (Angel, 2001)
- David Bedford, The Odyssey (Virgin, 1976)
- Gregg Bissonette, Gregg Bissonette (Mascot, 1998)
- Toni Childs, House of Hope (A&M, 1991)
- Deeyah Khan, Ataraxis (Heilo, 2007)
- Jo Jo Laine, Dancin' Man (Polydor, 1980)
- Jon Lord, Sarabande, (Purple, 1976)
- Juicy Lucy, Blue Thunder (Outer Music, 1996)
- Roberto Menescal, Bossa Nova Meets the Beatles (Deck/Jingle Bells 2017)
- Anthony Moore, Out (Virgin, 1976)
- Paolo Rustichelli, Capri/Mystic Jazz (Verve Forecast, 1991)
- Neil Sedaka, Live at the Royal Festival Hall (Polydor, 1974)
- Michael Shrieve, Stiletto (Novus/RCA/BMG, 1989)
- Carly Simon, Hello Big Man (Warner Bros., 1983)
- Sting, ...Nothing Like the Sun (A&M, 1987)
- Andrew York, Centerpeace (2010)

== Books ==
- Throb (William Morrow, 1983)
- Light Strings (Chronicle, 2005)
- One Train Later (St Martins, 2006)
- I'll Be Watching You (Taschen, 2007)
- Desirer Walks the Streets (Nazraeli Press, 2008)
- The Bones of Chuang Tzu (Steidl, 2018)
- A Certain Strangeness (University of Texas Press, 2019)
- Fretted and Moaning (Rocket88, 2021)
