= Instrument =

Instrument may refer to:

== Science and technology ==
- Flight instruments, the devices used to measure the speed, altitude, and pertinent flight angles of various kinds of aircraft
- Laboratory equipment, the measuring tools used in a scientific laboratory, often electronic in nature
- Mathematical instrument, devices used in geometric construction or measurements in astronomy, surveying and navigation
- Measuring instrument, a device used to measure or compare physical properties
- Medical instrument, a device used to diagnose or treat diseases
- Optical instrument, relies on the properties of light
- Quantum instrument, a mathematical object in quantum theory combining the concepts of measurement and quantum operation
- Scientific instrument, a device used to collect scientific data
- Surgical instrument
- Vehicle instrument, a device measuring parameters of a vehicle, such as its speed or position
- Weather instrument, a device used to record aspects of the weather

== Music ==
- Musical instrument, a device designed to produce musical sounds
  - Experimental musical instrument
  - Percussion instrument, which is struck
  - String instrument, uses vibrating strings
  - Transposing instrument, allows music to be played in a different key
  - Wind instrument, which is blown
    - Brass instrument, a sub type of wind instruments
    - Woodwind instrument, another sub type
- Instrument (album), by To Rococo Rot, 2014
- Instrument Soundtrack, 1999 album by American band Fugazi
- Instrument 1, a MIDI controller designed by Artiphon

== Other uses ==
- Instrument (film), a documentary of the band Fugazi, directed by Jem Cohen
- Instruments (application), a performance visualizer
- Instrumental variable, a method used in statistics
- Financial instrument, a formal documentation of a financial transaction
- Legal instrument, a formal documentation of a status or transaction
- Negotiable instrument, a type of contract
- Statutory instrument, a form of legislation
- Instrumental case, in linguistics, a grammatical case expressing the instrument by which an action is performed

== See also ==
- Instrumental (disambiguation)
- Instrumentation (disambiguation)
