= Instrumentation (disambiguation) =

Instrumentation is the art and science of measurement and control.

Instrumentation may also refer to:

== Science and technology ==
- Instrumentation (computer programming), the ability to monitor a product's performance and to diagnose errors
- Virtual instrumentation, the use of customizable software and modular measurement hardware to create user-defined measurement systems
- Instrumentation amplifier, an integrated circuit sometimes used in measurement instruments
- Instrumentation, in the internal validity of the scientific study

== Other ==
- Instrumentation (music)

== See also ==
- Instrument (disambiguation)
