= Zoot Money's Big Roll Band =

British rhythm and blues and soul group (1961–1969;2003–2024)

Zoot Money's Big Roll Band was a British rhythm and blues and modern jazz group, with influence from rock and roll that was formed in England by Zoot Money, in the early autumn of 1961. The band has had a number of personnel changes over the years, was revived in 2003, and was still performing until Money’s 2024 death at the age of 82.

== History ==
=== 1961–1963 ===
In autumn 1961 Zoot Money formed the first version of the Big Roll Band with himself as vocalist, Roger Collis on lead guitar, pianist Al Kirtley (later of Trendsetters Limited), bassist Mike "Monty" Montgomery and drummer Johnny Hammond. The name 'Big Roll Band' derived from Money mis-hearing the phrase "big old band" from the third verse of Chuck Berry's "Johnny B. Goode". Their first public performance was on 12 November 1961 at Bournemouth's Downstairs Club. In 1962 drummer Pete Brookes replaced Hammond at the same time as bassist Johnny King replaced Montgomery and tenor sax player Kevin Drake joined the band. Kirtley left shortly afterwards, Money taking over on organ.

In late 1963/early 1964 Money established what became the best-known version of the band with bassist Paul Williams (who also sang), guitarist Andy Summers (then Somers, later of the Police, who had played with Money in the Don Robb Band), saxophonists Nick Newall and Clive Burrows (Burrows and Williams had played together in the Wes Minster Five), and Colin Allen on drums. Burrows left in autumn of 1965, going on to play with Geno Washington & the Ram Jam Band and the Alan Price Set. He was replaced by Johnny Almond.

=== 1964–1965 ===
In 1964 the Big Roll Band started playing regularly at The Flamingo Club in Soho, London. Their act featured Money's flamboyant frontman antics. The band signed to Decca Records and released a single that year before switching to EMI's Columbia label. In 1965 four more singles were released, and their first album, It Should Have Been Me, was issued in October of the same year.

=== 1966–1969 ===
At this time Money refused an offer to replace the Animals keyboardist Alan Price, preferring to remain as a vocalist. In July 1966 their single "Big Time Operator" became the group's most successful single, reaching number 25 in UK charts. Their album Zoot Live At Klooks Kleek, was released in October of that year promoting Money as an emerging solo artist and reached 23 in the UK charts. It was also released in the US by Epic Records label but lacked promotion.

During this period Money joined Alexis Korner's Blues Incorporated for a short spell before returning to his Big Roll Band, but fashions were drifting from rhythm and blues towards more experimental sounds and an emphasis on songwriting. Although a popular fixture on the London club circuit in the first half of the 1960s, they had little commercial success. In July 1967 the Big Roll Band morphed into Dantalian's Chariot with a psychedelic direction. In 1968 Money accepted a second offer to join 'Eric Burdon and The New Animals'. Money revived the Big Roll Band under a new line-up in 2003 and the band performed regularly at The Bull's Head, Barnes and other nearby venues.

== Cultural References ==
In Michael Moorcock's The Final Programme, the protagonist, Jeremiah 'Jerry' Cornelius, shows a great liking for Zoot Money's Big Roll Band. In the opening pages, "Zoot's Suite" is the very first piece of music referenced in the novel.

== Discography ==
=== Singles ===
- 1964: "The Uncle Willie"/"Zoot's Suite" Decca F 11954
- 1965: "Bring It On Home To Me"/"Good" Columbia DB 7518
- June 1965: "Please Stay"/"You Know You'll Cry" Columbia DB 7600
- September 1965: "Something Is Worrying Me"/"Stubborn Kind Of Fellow" Columbia DB 7697
- November 1965: "The Many Faces Of Love"/"Jump Back" Columbia DB 7768
- March 1966: "Let's Run For Cover"/"Self-Discipline" Columbia DB 7876
- July 1966: "Big Time Operator"/"Zoot's Sermon" Columbia DB 7975 - UK No. 25
- December 1966: "Star Of The Show"/"Mound Moves" Columbia DB 8090
- April 1967: "Nick Nack" / "I Really Learnt How To Cry" Columbia DB 8172

=== Albums ===
- October 1965: It Should've Been Me -

"I'll Go Crazy"/"Jump Back"/"Along Came John"/"Back Door Blues"/"It Should Have Been Me"/"Sweet Little Rock And Roller"/"My Wife Can't Cook"/"Rags And Old Iron"/"The Cat"/"Feelin' Sad"/"Bright Lights, Big City"/"Fina", Columbia 33SX 1734

- October 1966: Zoot! (live at Klooks Kleek) -

"Chauffeur"/"One And Only Man"/"I've Been Trying"/"Florence Of Arabia"/"Let The Good Times Roll"/"James Brown Medley"/"Mashed Potatoes U.S.A."/"Nothing Can Change This Love"/"Barefooting", Columbia SX 6075 (Reissued 2017 by Repertoire V245) - UK No. 23

- 2017: Zoot Money's Big Roll Band Box Set, Repertoire REP 5343:

CD 1:
Live at Klook's Kleek plus 1965 Singles -

"Chauffeur"/"The One And Only Man"/"I've Been Trying"/"Florence Of Arabia"/"Let The Good Times Roll"/"James Brown Medley"/"Mashed Potatoes U.S.A."/"Nothing Can Change This Love"/"Barefootin'"/"Good"/"Bring It On Home To Me"/"Please Stay"/You Know You'll Cry"/"Something Is Worrying Me"/"Stubborn Kind of Fellow"/"The Many Faces Of Love"

CD 2:
Live At The Flamingo plus 1966 Singles -

"I Got You (I Feel Good)"/"Smack Dab In The Middle"/"Boot-Leg"/"Train Train"/"Ain't That Peculiar"/"People Gonna Talk"/"It Should've Been Me"/"Hallelujah I Love Her So"/"Self-Discipline"/"Rock Me Baby"/"Stormy Monday Blues"/"Oh Mom (Teach Me How To Uncle Willie)"/"When I Meet My Baby"/"Blues March"/"You Don't Know Like I Know"/"Big Time Operator"/"Hide Nor Hair"/"Haunted House"/"La La La La La/The 'In' Crowd"/"Let's Run For Cover"/"Self-Discipline"/"Big Time Operator"/"Zoot's Sermon"

CD 3:
Live At The BBC plus 1964 in the studio -

"Cool Jerk"/"Interview"/"Big Time Operator"/"Barefootin'"/"BBC Announcement"/"I Can't Turn You Loose"/"Interview"/"Chauffeur"/"Picture Me Gone"/"Interview"/"Star Of The Show"/"Let The Good Times Roll"/"Interview"/"Something's Worrying Me"/"Ain't That Love"/"You Don't Know Like I Know"/"Interview"/"Let's Run For Cover"/"People Gonna Talk"/"Think"/"The Morning After"/"It's Been Such A Long Way Home"/"You Can't Sit Down"/"What Cha Gonna Do?"/"The Uncle Willie"/"Zoot's Suit(e)"/"Gin House"/"Rockin' Chair"/"Get On The Right Track Baby"/"Walking The Dog"

CD 4:
It Should've Been Me plus 1966-1968 in the studio -

"I'll Go Crazy"/"Jump Back"/"Along Came John"/"Back Door Blues"/"It Should've Been Me"/"Sweet Little Rock And Roller"/"My Wife Can't Cook"/"Rags And Old Iron"/"The Cat"/"Feelin' Sad"/"Bright Lights, Big City"/"Fina"/"The Star Of The Show"/"The Mound Moves"/"It Should've Been Me (EP Version)"/"Nick Knack"/"I Really Learnt How To Cry"/"Stop The Wedding"/"Just A Passing Phase"/"What Cha Gonna Do 'Bout It"/"Coffee Song"

== See also ==
- Georgie Fame and the Blue Flames
- Geno Washington & the Ram Jam Band
- Cliff Bennett and the Rebel Rousers
