= Bewitched (Andy Summers and Robert Fripp album) =

Studio album by Andy Summers and Robert Fripp
- Released: 1984
- Recorded: April – May 1984
- Studios: Arny's Shack, Parkstone, Dorset
- Genres: Rock; synth-pop
- Length: 40:13
- Label: A&M
- Producers: Robert Fripp, Andy Summers

Andy Summers and Robert Fripp chronology
I Advance Masked (1982)	Bewitched (1984)

Robert Fripp chronology
I Advance Masked (1982)	Bewitched (1984)	Network (1985)

Andy Summers chronology
I Advance Masked (1982)	Bewitched (1983)	XYZ (1987)

Bewitched is the second and final collaboration album between English guitarists Andy Summers and Robert Fripp, released in 1984 by A&M Records. As with its predecessor, I Advance Masked (1982), it contains instrumentals.

It contrasted with I Advance Masked by being more pop-oriented. Summers believes that Bewitched instead focuses more specifically on the guitarists "meeting on a different mountain and learning how to work together. So much of guitar playing in this sort of situation is human psychology. How do I get the very best out of Robert Fripp in the studio? And we did it. It’s a balanced record." The only single from the album, "Parade", was supported by a music video but it failed to chart. Summers described the finished album in 2024 as "sort of ahead of its time."

Bewitched was one of several two-man collaborative albums from the mid-1980s to feature drum machines and heavy overdubbing, alongside Fred Frith's and Henry Kaiser's Who Needs Enemies? (1983), Robert Quine's and Fred Maher's Basic (1984) and Bill Frisell's and Vernon Reid's Smash & Scatteration (1985).

== Retrospective critical reception ==
John Walker and Mark Fleischmann believed that Bewitched proves that Summers was not comparable to Brian Eno, and that resultingly the album is inferior to Fripp's 1970s albums with Eno. They criticised Summers for "[thickening] the mix with electronic muck, leaving little solo space for himself or Fripp, who co-wrote only half the material on Bewitched; the rest is Summers' alone. Maybe they were too busy toying with the synth-pop trappings that dominate the record to bother playing much guitar."

In his AllMusic review, Greg Prato noted that this new album of instrumentals was "much more rock-oriented" than the texture-focused I Advance Masked, adding that it was originally intended to be more eclectic, with the duo intending to record calypso and Ry Cooder-style Tex-Mex music. Prato praised the completed album for its strong guitar work, noting that Summers and Fripp "insert challenging sections into their songs (such as the 7/4 time signature in 'Maquillage'), without making them seem like an obvious attempt to impress fellow musicians. Although '80s-sounding electronic drums are primarily used for backbeats (such as the track 'Train'), it doesn't take away from the album's charm."

== Track listing ==
All tracks written by Andy Summers and Robert Fripp.

1. "Parade" – 3:02
2. "What Kind of Man Reads Playboy?" – 11:10
3. "Begin the Day" – 3:38
4. "Train" – 4:34
5. "Bewitched" – 3:54
6. "Tribe" – 3:29
7. "Maquillage" – 2:18
8. "Guide" – 2:34
9. "Forgotten Steps" – 4:02
10. "Image and Likeness" – 1:32
