= Charming Snakes =

Studio album by Andy Summers
- Released: 1990
- Studios: Beat Street (North Hollywood, California); Red Herring (Venice, California)
- Genres: Jazz rock, jazz fusion
- Length: 51:06
- Label: Private Music
- Producers: Andy Summers; David Hentschel

Andy Summers chronology
The Golden Wire (1989)	Charming Snakes (1990)	World Gone Strange (1991)

Charming Snakes is an album by the English musician Andy Summers. It was released in 1990. Summers promoted the album by opening the 1991 Montreal International Jazz Festival; he also played shows with John McLaughlin.

== Production ==
The album was produced by Summers and David Hentschel. "Monk Gets Ripped" is a tribute to Thelonious Monk. Herbie Hancock played on "Innocence Falls Prey" and "Big Thing". Sting played bass on the title track. Bill Evans played saxophone on many of the tracks.

== Critical reception ==
Professional ratings
Review scores
Source	Rating
AllMusic	3/5 stars
Calgary Herald	B−
The Encyclopedia of Popular Music	4/5 stars
MusicHound Rock: The Essential Album Guide	4/5 stars
The Rolling Stone Album Guide	4/5 stars

The Calgary Herald wrote that "the shift to jazz from rock continues," and praised the "vibrant, fluid guitar." The Washington Post determined that "Summers has progressed from the mood noodlings of his earlier solo recordings to solidly structured and arranged pieces." The Dallas Morning News concluded that, "this time out, he eschews most of his synthpop inclinations and puts himself in a studio of consummate session players... This nearly traditional jazz format results in his most lyrical instrumental album so far."

The Vancouver Sun noted that "the guitar is a little more frenetic, the bass faster paced, with strong jazz influences." The Gazette lamented that "Summers couldn't write a catchy melody to save his life."

AllMusic called the album "a strong jazz-rock statement," writing that "Summers's guitar covers the spectrum from in-your-face wailing leads to subtle background colorings, with much use of electronic effects." MusicHound Rock: The Essential Album Guide considered it "Summers's first and best turn from ambient rock guitar noise to artful jazz fusion."

== Track listing ==
All tracks are written by Andy Summers.

No.	Title	Writer(s)	Length
1.	"Mexico 1920"	Summers, David Hentschel	4:00
2.	"Charming Snakes"		5:14
3.	"Big Thing"	Summers, Hentschel, Dennis Smith	7:07
4.	"Rainmaker"		6:18
5.	"Charis"		3:19
6.	"Mickey Goes to Africa"		4:53
7.	"Innocence Falls Prey"		2:45
8.	"Passion of the Shadow"		5:10
9.	"Monk Gets Ripped"		3:57
10.	"Easy on the Ice"	Summers, Hentschel	4:34
11.	"The Strong & the Beautiful"	Summers, Hentschel	3:49

== Personnel ==
- Andy Summers – guitars, slide guitar (6), banjo (6)
- Brian Auger – keyboards (1, 10, 11)
- David Hentschel – keyboards (2–4, 8–10), organ (6)
- Herbie Hancock – keyboards (2, 3, 7), acoustic piano intro solo (3)
- Doug Lunn – bass (1, 3, 4, 6–11), high bass (2)
- Sting – bass (2)
- Darryl Jones – bass (4)
- Chad Wackerman – drums (1–4, 6–11)
- Ed Mann – percussion (3, 4, 6, 8, 11)
- Bill Evans – soprano saxophone (1, 2, 4, 5, 7, 8), tenor saxophone (6, 7)
- Mark Isham – trumpet (4, 6, 9, 10)

Production

- David Hentschel – producer, recording, mixing
- Andy Summers – producer, mixing
- Jan Lucas – recording assistant
- Dennis Smith – recording assistant
- Brian Gardner – mastering at Bernie Grundman Mastering (Hollywood, California)
- Norman Moore – art direction, design
- Merlyn Rosenberg – photography
