= The Golden Wire =

Studio album by Andy Summers
- Released: 1989
- Recorded: November 1988 – January 1989
- Studios: Evoke (Venice, California); Mad Hatter and The Complex (Los Angeles, California)
- Genres: Jazz rock; new-age
- Length: 55:33
- Label: Private Music
- Producers: Andy Summers, David Hentschel

Andy Summers chronology
Mysterious Barricades (1988)	The Golden Wire (1989)	Charming Snakes (1990)

The Golden Wire is the third solo album by the English musician Andy Summers, released in 1989. Summers promoted the album with a North American tour. "A Piece of Time" was nominated for a Grammy Award for "Best Rock Instrumental Performance".

== Production ==
The album was produced by Summers and David Hentschel. Summers remained more interested in jazz and instrumental music than in rock music. Paul McCandless played saxophone or oboe on some of the tracks. Jimmy Haslip played bass. Najma Akhtar sang on "Piya Tose", the only track on the album with vocals.

== Critical reception ==
Professional ratings
Review scores
Source	Rating
AllMusic	4/5 stars
Chicago Tribune	1.5/4 stars
The Cincinnati Enquirer	2/5 stars
MusicHound Rock: The Essential Album Guide	3.5/5 stars
The Philadelphia Inquirer	3/4 stars
The Rolling Stone Album Guide	4/5 stars
The Tampa Tribune	2/4 stars

Stephen Holden of The New York Times wrote that "the music embraces an array of styles from jazz-rock in the mystical mode of the Mahavishnu Orchestra to pastoral reveries that have a floating new-age ambiance." The Orlando Sentinel stated that the album "delves deeper into New Age and world-music sounds." Ira Robbins of Trouser Press praised the "much-needed rhythmic muscle and textural variety." The Philadelphia Inquirer considered it Summers's "most thematic and tuneful guitar record."

The Edmonton Journal called the album "a high density blend of dreamy effects and rhythmic forces that draw comparison with the two records Summers recorded with Robert Fripp in the early 80's." The Chicago Tribune stated that the Summers "drifts from brief encounters with the echo unit that gave the Police their trademark sound to samplings of rhythms from around the globe." The Times deemed The Golden Wire "all pleasantly aimless and rather academic."

Rob Caldwell of AllMusic wrote that "the textures here have more in common with his work as guitarist for the Police, though his playing is better highlighted in this solo context."

== Track listing ==
All tracks are written by Andy Summers.

No.	Title	Writer(s)	Length
1.	"A Piece of Time"		6:35
2.	"The Golden Wire"		5:22
3.	"Earthly Pleasures"		6:29
4.	"Imagine You"		2:37
5.	"Vigango"		6:10
6.	"Blues for Snake"		4:57
7.	"The Island of Silk"	Summers, David Hentschel	5:09
8.	"Journey Through Blue Regions"		2:10
9.	"Piya Tose"		4:36
10.	"Rain Forest in Manhattan"		5:53
11.	"A Thousand Stones"		4:18

== Personnel ==
- Andy Summers – guitars (1, 4–6, 8–11), acoustic guitar (2, 3, 7), electric guitar (2, 3, 7), banjo (5)
- David Hentschel – keyboards (1–3, 5, 7, 9, 10), drum programming (1–3, 5, 6)
- Stephen Croes – Synclavier (2, 6, 9, 10)
- Doug Lunn – bass (1, 5, 8, 10)
- Jimmy Haslip – bass (2, 6, 9)
- Kurt Wortman – drums (1, 5), percussion (1, 2, 5, 7–10), drum programming (3), xianjiang tambourine (8)
- Paul McCandless – oboe (1), soprano saxophone (2, 5, 6), wooden flutes (10)
- Najma Akhtar – vocals (9)

Production

- Andy Summers – producer
- David Hentschel – producer, recording, mixing
- Darren Mora – recording assistant
- Dennis Smith – recording assistant, technical assistance, loop recording
- Sharon Rice – mix assistant
- Brian Gardner – mastering at Bernie Grundman Mastering (Hollywood, California)
- Norman Moore – art direction, design
- Glen Erler – photography
