= I Advance Masked =

Studio album by Andy Summers and Robert Fripp
- Released: 24 September 1982
- Recorded: September 1981 and May 1982
- Studios: Arny's Shack, Parkstone, Dorset; Island Studios, London
- Genres: Avant-garde; ambient
- Length: 38:43
- Label: A&M
- Producers: Robert Fripp; Andy Summers

Andy Summers and Robert Fripp chronology
I Advance Masked (1982)	Bewitched (1984)

Robert Fripp chronology
Let the Power Fall: An Album of Frippertronics (1981)	I Advance Masked (1982)	Network (1985)

Andy Summers chronology
I Advance Masked (1982)	XYZ (1987)

Professional ratings
Review scores
Source	Rating
AllMusic	link
Rolling Stone	link
Sounds	4/5 stars

I Advance Masked is a 1982 album by the English guitarists Andy Summers and Robert Fripp. It is the pair's first of two album collaborations and it consists of 13 instrumental tracks.

== Background ==
Summers and Fripp had met in Bournemouth in the early 1960s. Summers grew up in the town and was at the time the guitarist of the Zoot Money Big Roll Band. Fripp was attending the Bournemouth and Poole College, where he had enrolled to study economics, economic history and political history. When Fripp and his band the Majestic Dance Orchestra secured their first regular gig at the Bournemouth Majestic Hotel, they replaced Zoot Money and Andy Summers who had just moved to London. Fripp and Summers remained friends over the years, and as soon as they had a break in the touring and recording schedules of their respective bands, King Crimson and The Police, they met for some jams that eventually led to an album. Fripp and Summers recorded at the Arny's Shack studio in Parkstone, Dorset. According to Summers, the album was "a synthesis of two guys who grew up playing guitar, heard the Beatles, listened to jazz, have been influenced by Oriental music and Steve Reich, but still happen to be playing in a rock context. Every track started the same way, just two guitars. On some of them I played a little bass or put on a bit of percussion or string synthesizer. There are no drums but you don't miss them. Some of it is very accessible and some is very avant-garde". The cover painting is by American pop artist James Rizzi. The title track was released as a single with "Hardy Country" on the flip side.

== Bewitched ==
Fripp and Summers recorded a second album, Bewitched, in 1984. In contrast with I Advance Masked, Bewitched was more of a pop-sounding record. According to Summers, this time the album was about two highly skilled and educated guitarists "meeting on a different mountain and learning how to work together. So much of guitar playing in this sort of situation is human psychology. How do I get the very best out of Robert Fripp in the studio? And we did it. It's a balanced record."

== Track listing ==
All tracks are written by Andy Summers and Robert Fripp.

Side one
No.	Title	Length
1.	"I Advance Masked"	5:14
2.	"Under Bridges of Silence"	1:41
3.	"China – Yellow Leader"	7:09
4.	"In the Cloud Forest"	2:30
5.	"New Marimba"	3:38
6.	"Girl on a Swing"	2:03

Side two
No.	Title	Length
7.	"Hardy Country"	3:00
8.	"The Truth of Skies"	2:07
9.	"Painting and Dance"	3:24
10.	"Still Point"	3:08
11.	"Lakeland/Aquarelle"	1:43
12.	"Seven on Seven"	1:38
13.	"Stultified"	1:25

== Personnel ==
- Robert Fripp – electric guitars, Moog and Roland synthesizers, Roland guitar synthesizer, Fender bass, percussion
- Andy Summers – electric guitars, Moog and Roland synthesizers, piano, Roland guitar synthesizer, Fender bass, percussion

Technical personnel

- Tim Summerhayes, Tony Arnold – engineer
- Andy Summers, Michael Ross – design
- James Rizzi – cover
- Jill Furmanovsky – photography
