= World Gone Strange =

Studio album by Andy Summers
- Released: August 27, 1991
- Recorded: May 21 – June 14, 1991
- Studio: Centerfield (New York City, New York)
- Genre: Jazz fusion
- Length: 50:11
- Label: Private Music
- Producer: Mike Mainieri

Andy Summers chronology
| Charming Snakes (1990) | World Gone Strange (1991) | Invisible Threads (1993) |

World Gone Strange is a 1991 solo album by Andy Summers. It was his first solo album which did not involve producer David Hentschel, and the last one recorded for the jazz fusion label Private Music. The title track presents a distinct descending pattern and features a wordless vocal by Summers himself. Summers utilized one of his own mixed media compositions for the cover.

== Reception ==
Professional ratings
Review scores
| Source | Rating |
|---|---|
| AllMusic | 2/5 stars |

AllMusic's review of the album consisted of a single sentence fragment: "Not really standard jazz, but some fine playing."

== Track listing ==
All tracks are written by Andy Summers.

World Gone Strange track listing
| No. | Title | Length |
|---|---|---|
| 1. | "World Gone Strange" | 6:14 |
| 2. | "Ruffled Feathers" | 4:23 |
| 3. | "Bacchante" | 6:28 |
| 4. | "Song for M" | 4:58 |
| 5. | "Rhythm Spirits" | 6:03 |
| 6. | "Somewhere in the West" | 5:10 |
| 7. | "But She" | 4:53 |
| 8. | "The Blues Prior to Richard" | 4:47 |
| 9. | "Oudu Kanjaira" | 5:15 |
| 10. | "Dream Trains" | 1:50 |

== Personnel ==
- Andy Summers – guitars, vocals
- Mitchel Forman – keyboards
- Eliane Elias – acoustic piano (1, 3), vocals (1, 3)
- Tony Levin – bass (1–3, 5, 7–10)
- Victor Bailey – bass (4, 6)
- Chad Wackerman – drums
- Manolo Badrena – percussion (1, 3, 9)
- Mino Cinelu – percussion (1, 3, 9)
- Mike Mainieri – marimba (9)
- Naná Vasconcelos – percussion (9)
- Bendik Hofseth – soprano saxophone (9)

Production

- Mike Mainieri – producer, mixing, assistant engineer
- Garry Rindfuss – recording, mixing
- Øystein Sevåg – mixing
- Dennis Smith – technical assistance
- Bob Ludwig – mastering at Masterdisk (New York, NY)
- Joshua Cantor – production coordinator
- Norman Moore – art direction, design
- Merlyn Rosenberg – photography
- Andy Summers – cover artwork
