= Roland Bolt amplifier =

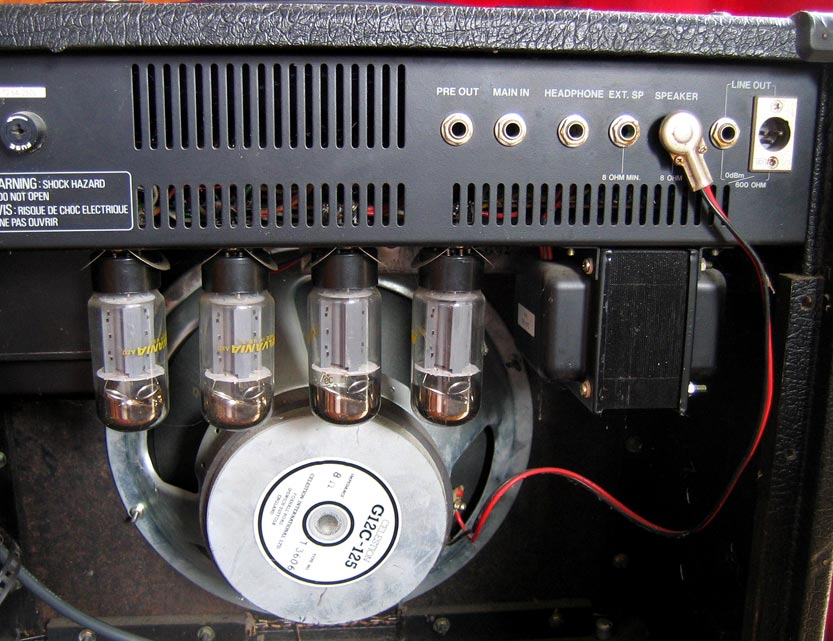
The Roland Bolt 100 amplifier, tubes and driver.

The Roland Bolt 30/60/100 was the only line of tube guitar amplifiers produced by Roland. The Bolt amplifier series was released in 1979.

The Bolt amplifier uses a hybrid circuit, with a MOSFET-based solid state preamp section and an all Tube power amp.

In the case of the Bolt 60 the power amp section is an exact clone of the Fender AB763 circuit, it uses two 6L6GC power tubes and one 12AT7 Phase Inverter. The amplifiers have two channels, clean and Overdrive, switchable on the front panel or through a foot-switch. Aside from the overdrive circuit, the amp contains a spring reverb and provision for external effects using the effects loop.

The Bolt was produced until 1984.

Both combo (amp/speaker) and 'head' versions of these amplifiers were produced, and three models were released: the Bolt 30 (30 watts), Bolt 60 (60 watts) and the Bolt 100 (100 watts).
