= Circus Hero =

Studio album by Circa Zero
- Released: March 25, 2014
- Recorded: May 2013
- Studio: Bowl of Cherries Studios, Venice, California, U.S.
- Genre: Rock
- Length: 60:34
- Label: 429 Records
- Producer: Andy Summers and Rob Giles

Circus Hero is the only album released by Circa Zero, a band formed in August 2013 by Andy Summers and Rob Giles from The Rescues. Originally, drummer Emmanuelle Caplette was also a member of the band. Released on 25 March 2014, the album was titled after a malapropism of the band's name made by a radio disc jockey during an interview with Summers. The single "Levitation" reached number 36 on the Japan Hot 100 chart.

== Critical reception ==
Professional ratings
Review scores
| Source | Rating |
|---|---|
| AllMusic | 3/5 stars |

AllMusic praised the album's style as "articulate and progressive power pop being played in a musical landscape otherwise littered with large chamber folk ensembles and over-processed electro-pop acts." They criticized the songs "Gamma Ray", "Summer Lies", "No Highway", and "Light the Fuse and Run" as being "uninspired", but concluded that the overall effort showed Andy Summers making a strong return to the same musical style as The Police.

== Track listing ==
All tracks are written by Andy Summers and Rob Giles.

| No. | Title | Length |
|---|---|---|
| 1. | "Levitation" | 4:00 |
| 2. | "Underground" | 3:53 |
| 3. | "The Story Ends Here" | 3:37 |
| 4. | "Say Goodnight" | 4:28 |
| 5. | "Gamma Ray" | 6:12 |
| 6. | "Night Time Travelers" | 6:19 |
| 7. | "Shoot Out the Stars" | 4:33 |
| 8. | "Underwater" | 4:25 |
| 9. | "Summer Lies" | 4:30 |
| 10. | "No Highway" | 5:50 |
| 11. | "Light the Fuse & Run" | 3:58 |
| 12. | "Whenever You Hear the Rain" | 6:05 |
| 13. | "Hot Camel" | 2:44 |

== Personnel ==
Circa Zero

- Andy Summers – guitar
- Rob Giles – bass guitar, drums, vocals
- Dan Epand – drums on tracks 3, 12, 13
