= Instrumentality (theology) =

Theological theory

Instrumentality is a theological theory that falls under the broader category of the prophetic model of biblical inspiration. Those who espouse the prophetic model consider the authors of all the books of the bible to have been inspired in the same way prophets have been inspired by God to preach. Although, as Réginald Garrigou-Lagrange notes, a prophet can act based on direct revelation from God or from inspiration.

The latter is what is relevant when it comes to biblical interpretation. This model of biblical inspiration played a dominant role in the Early Church and was fully and systematically explained by medieval theologians like Thomas Aquinas. Thomas discusses prophesy in Questions 171-174 of the Second Part of the Second Part of the Summa Theologica. Thomas uses earlier theologians, namely Augustine of Hippo and Pope Gregory the Great, to support his argument. Jewish theologians such as Maimonides also defended this model.

== Definition ==
Instrumentality is the theory that through divine inspiration the scripture has two authors, God and the human author, "Thus Scripture has two authors, one divine and principal, the other human and instrumental." It is through instrumentality that God has chosen specific writers to compose his message in the form of scripture. God uses man as an instrument to convey his word, but he allows these writers to maintain their own literary style. Therefore, we see that both God, through the working of the Holy Spirit, and the human writer, which he chooses to be his instrument, both are considered authors of the scripture>. "And it this peculiar and singular power of Holy Scripture, arising from the inspiration of the Holy Ghost, which gives authority to the sacred orator, fill him with apostolic liberty of speech, and communicates force and power to his eloquence." Thus this divine inspiration both inspired the words of the author on matter of faith and also inspires the author into the action of writing, "Inspiration, then, to repeat, is a divine causality, physical and supernatural, which elevates and moves the human writer in such fashion that he writes, for the benefit of the Church, all that God wills and in the way God wills." Instrumentality then explains all of the different styles, audiences, locations and recollections seen throughout scripture. This is why inconsequential mistakes can be made by the human authors. It is the only in matters of faith that the human instrument is infallible, "And since it is in judgment that truth or falsity resides, the infused judgment of the inspired writer is divinely and infallibly certain."

== Thomas Aquinas ==
The specific category of instrumentality relies on the Aristotelian-Thomistic doctrine of causality. Both God and the human authors are efficient causes. An efficient cause is an agent which brings about some effect. The human author is used by God as an instrument (hence the name “instrumentality”) to communicate his word. In order to better understand how God actually uses the human author as an instrument, one must have a little knowledge of Thomas’ theory of knowledge. This is what Thomas uses to show exactly how God uses humans as his instruments in terms of biblical inspiration. First, Thomas begins to explain this complex theory concisely saying, "Things are represented to the human mind under the form of species." By using the term "species", Thomas is talking about what senses receive when something is experienced. Species, according to Thomas, "must be represented first to the senses [sight, smell, touch, taste, hearing], secondly to the imagination." The images produced by the imagination are then used by the active intellect, which is what actually makes us understand. Finally, what is abstracted from the active intellect is placed into the passive intellect which is somewhat like a holding dock. Given this system, God inspires in one of three ways. First one can be inspired "by the mere infusion of light" which helps the active intellect to understand something that it would not have otherwise. Thomas understands the intellect to be like the sun. The brighter it is, the better it understands. If God floods it with light, it understands more. Second, one can be inspired "by imprinting species anew", which puts into the mind of the author something that he or she had not otherwise received by his or her experiences. Finally, one can be inspired "by a new coordination of species" by which species already in the mind are reordered so as to bring about a new understanding. God, in doing one of these three things, is therefore the primary cause. The human author who is receptive to God’s action and then makes a judgment about the knowledge he has acquired is the instrumental cause by which the divinely inspired knowledge is transmitted. The human author writes in his own way and often to particular audiences. God fully respects the freedom of the author to do just that.

== Notable figures ==
Thomas Aquinas is the most notable influence in the theory of instrumentality. Thomas Aquinas has long been thought to be the most important figure in this theory, even as stated by the Church, "The valuable work of the scholastics in Holy Scripture is seen in their theological treaties and in their Scripture commentaries; and in this respect the greatest name among them all is St. Tomas of Aquin." From the Summa Theologica we see that Aquinas begins by building his thought off of the works of Augustine. Aquinas used Augustine’s thoughts about divine inspiration as a building block to build up his own theory, "But, indeed, all those who have a right to speak are agreed that there is in the Holy Scripture an eloquence that is wonderfully varied and rich, and worthy of great themes." Where Aquinas breaks away is where he explains that the scriptures have two authors, as opposed to God being the sole author of the scriptures. Aquinas shows that there are indeed two authors, God being one author and man being the other author, "In those things which do not come under the obligation of faith, the Saints were at liberty to hold divergent opinions, just as we ourselves are." Through this quote Aquinas shows that God not only uses these human writers as instruments, but more specifically they are only inspired by the Holy Spirit in matters of faith. This is how Aquinas explains how some of the scripture holds falsities. However, these falsehoods are not carried into matters of faith. We can fully understand Aquinas’ view of instrumentality through his definition of prophecy, "Under the name ‘prophecy,’ St. Tomas includes all charismatic intellectual graces." The key to this definition is the understanding of the term charisma. Charisma, in a theological sense, is known as being a gift or talent from heaven that gives an individual the ability and authority to rule other. In conclusion, Aquinas sees the use of human beings as instruments of God a matter of prophecy. He does these through the meaning of prophecy as the work of God in a person who was given the authority by heaven, through the Holy Spirit, to write of the intellectual graces, the Word of God.
