= Hackaball =

Educational computing science ball

- Developer: Made by Many
- Type: Educational technology
- Dimensions: 10 centimetres (3.9 in) diameter
- Marketing target: Six to ten-year-olds

Hackaball is an educational toy designed to teach school children computer programming through active play. It works by linking motion inputs from a gyroscope with various outputs to create games, aided by a companion app. Hackaball began as a project assigned to two interns at Made by Many in 2013, coinciding with the introduction of computing science to the National Curriculum for England. After identifying a perceived gap in beginner programming tools, they came up with six possible designs to investigate. Out of these, "Rule Ball" (later Hackaball) was chosen to be developed further. After three years of development, Hackaball's production was funded through a month-long Kickstarter campaign that raised over $240,000.

Critical reception to Hackaball was generally positive: critics praised the attention to detail in Hackaball's design and its interactive nature. For their work on Hackaball, Made by Many was a finalist or shortlisted in several design awards, like Fast Company's Innovation by Design awards. Hackaball was named one of Time magazine's best inventions of 2015 and won a bronze and silver award in the 2015 Lovie Awards.

== Production ==
=== Development ===
Hackaball was created by two London-based design companies: Made by Many and the Barber Osgerby spin-off Map Project Office. It was conceptualised in 2012 by two interns at Made by Many—Ben King and Thomas Nadin—when they were given a side project to investigate the intersection of the Internet of Things with play. To tackle this, they aimed to make computer programming more available to children by using activities to teach programming. Made by Many felt that existing "beginner" programming tools were too complex for children due to having no prior subject knowledge. The timing of the project coincided with the introduction of computing science into the National Curriculum for England. To make it accessible to a wide audience, efforts were made to make Hackaball gender-neutral.

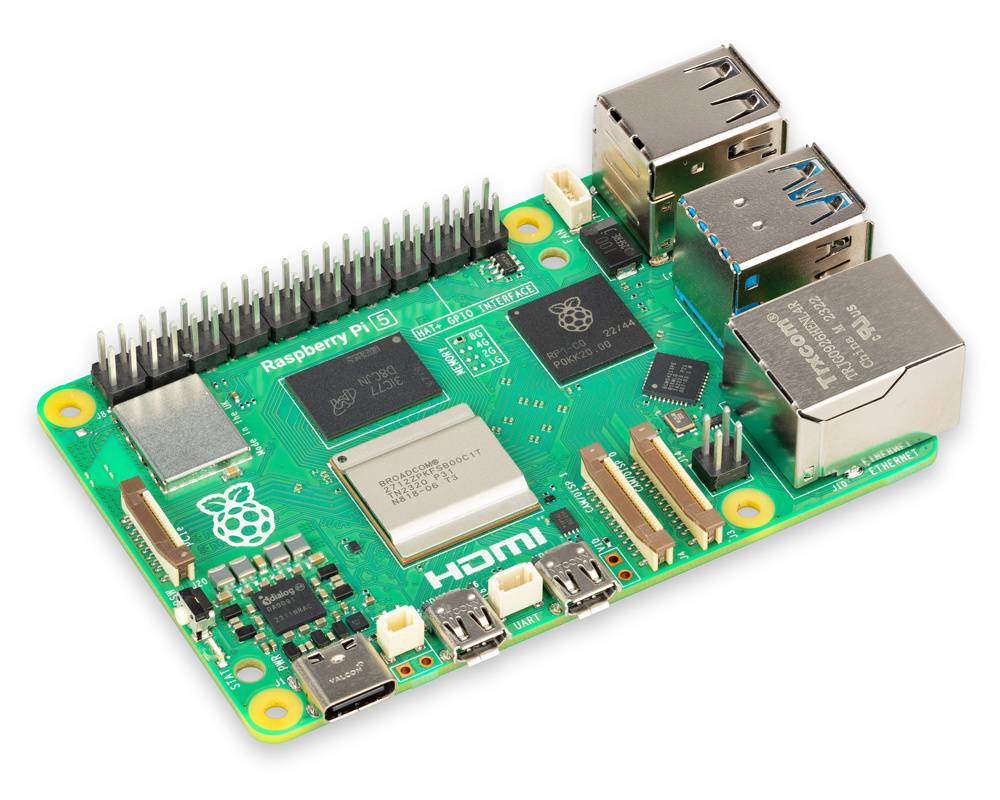
A Raspberry Pi single-board computer

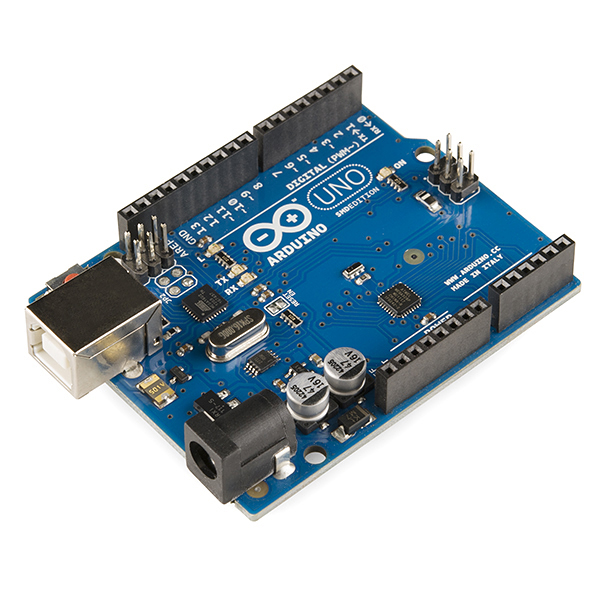
An Arduino Uno R3 single-board microcontroller

Early prototypes of Hackaball used Raspberry Pi and Arduino boards connected to socks or foam balls

Two weeks into their project, King and Nadin drafted six possible designs to look into more. After consulting with Made By Many's co-founder Stuart Eccles and the general public, they decided to move forward with Hackaball (then called "Rule Ball"). Prototyping began after a new member, Melissa Coleman, joined King and Nadin on the project during the summer. Early prototypes of Hackaball were basic and crude, made of Arduino boards and foam balls or "sock[s] filled with a Raspberry Pi and some wires".

A particularly difficult area of development was making the ball resistant to shock damage. According to Map's Jon Marshall, "It required a huge amount of technical experimentation to create a shockproof design for the inner-core module. There was also a lot of material experimentation to get the right amount of squash and bounce into the ball and sleeve design but retain the ability for users to open up the ball and see the inner working, and for charging the battery." Coleman said that she would test prototypes of Hackaball by throwing them down staircases or off the mezzanine in Made by Many's office.

A separate team at Made by Many started designing the accompanying resources for Hackaball around that time. Some difficulty was encountered when creating the design for the companion app, which needed to use a simple programming language to be accessible to younger ages. After looking at programming languages like Pascal and Visual Basic, as well as other sources like "choose your path" and Mad Libs books, they settled on using a system based around "if this, then that" (IFTTT) constructs due to simplicity.

In 2014, Made by Many began testing Hackaball in school playgrounds; throughout production, Hackaball was tested with over 100 families with children of varying ages. Around this time they asked Map Project Office, who was involved with a similar project Kano, to help out with hardware development after struggling to move forward with it themselves. Together, they began making new prototypes out of foam and card, before moving to 3D printing and vacuum casting. Coding began on the companion app, which was written in Objective-C and Swift by Made by Many's Julian James. Other contributions to Hackaball were made by Karl Sadler of Obelisk Music, and Kudu, who worked on sound and electronics respectively.

=== Kickstarter and release ===
After producing a design ready to be presented to consumers, a Kickstarter campaign with a goal of $100,000 was launched on 3 March 2015. By its end on 2 April, the campaign raised $241,122, with 2,312 backers contributing. Manufacturing contracts were arranged with a company located in Shenzhen, China, in 2016. After designs were finalised (after between 50 and 100 prototypes), production started on 26 August. The first units were shipped around the end of the year.

== Design ==
Hackaball's internal electronics consist of a six-axis gyroscope, vibrator, nine LEDs, rechargeable battery, memory, microphone and a loudspeaker (with a selection of sound effects). These components are stored within a two-part transparent ball made of polypropylene. A silicone rubber covering with a cut-out "eye" holds the pieces together and is used along with an internal absorber made of ABS and TPE plastics to make Hackaball shock-absorbent. The completed ball is sized in between a baseball and a football, with a diameter of 10 centimetres (3.9 in).

Hackaball is shipped unassembled in a "broken" state. After assembling the two hemispheres using the silicone covering, users activate the ball via a tutorial on a companion app. The ball can then be programmed using the space-themed iPad app connected via Bluetooth. Icons are used in the app to make it accessible to different ages of children, with a focus on animated graphics instead of text. Programming links inputs, such as throwing or bouncing the ball, and outputs, such as flashing a colour or playing a sound, to create games using "if this, then that" statements. Programming games with Hackaball progressively unlocks new features to use in the app. Some example programs created by users include Magic 8 balls, whoopee cushions and alarm clocks; created games then appear in the app as constellations of stars. A number of pre-made games are available out of the box. Programs can be shared locally between users; unrestricted sharing was scrapped after parental feedback.

== Reception and legacy ==
Hackaball had a generally positive reception from design and technology critics. Core77's Sam Dunne commented on the attention to detail in Hackaball's design, calling it "of a rare level of sophistication for the realms of Kickstarterdom". Margaret Rhodes of Wired suggested Hackaball could teach younger children the "alphabet" of computer science, as opposed to other more advanced education tools like littleBits and Kano. Rhodes also discussed how it "speaks to a mounting desire for gadgets that don’t confine us to a desk and a screen", and how Hackaball "hits that note dead on" with its interactive nature. Hackaball has been used in classrooms as a teaching tool: Made by Many developed lesson plans for Hackaball to help it teach computing in schools.

Hackaball was included in several end-of-year lists and design awards. Time magazine included it on their list of the best inventions of 2015. Hackaball was one of the product design finalists in Fast Company's 2015 Innovation by Design awards. It was also shortlisted for the 2015 Stuff Gadget Awards in the "Tech Toy of the Year" category. Hackaball was nominated for The Index Project's Index Award and Interaction Design Association's Interaction Awards in 2015, and was a finalist in the latter. Made by Many also won a gold award in the 2015 UX Awards for Hackaball, winning the "Most Engaging UX for Digital Education" category. In the International Academy of Digital Arts and Sciences' 2015 Lovie Awards, Hackaball was awarded a bronze award in the "General-Connected Products & Wearables" category and a silver award in the "General-Family & Kids" category.
