= My Songs =

Studio album by Sting
- Released: 24 May 2019
- Length: 60:54
- Label: A&M
- Producers: Dave Audé; Jerry Fuentes; Martin Kierszenbaum

Sting chronology
44/876 (2018)	My Songs (2019)	Duets (2021)

Professional ratings
Review scores
Source	Rating
AllMusic	2/5 stars

My Songs is the fourteenth album by British singer-songwriter Sting and his second album to feature new renditions of previously released material (after 2010's Symphonicities). The album was released on 24 May 2019.

== Background ==
The album features fifteen reworked versions of a selection of Sting's most widely recognised songs from across his career. Via his social media outlets, Sting described the new versions of the songs as being "reconstructed", "refitted" and "reframed", but "with a contemporary focus". Some songs on the album have been remixed using elements of the original tracks, while others are complete re-recordings.

A remixed version of "Brand New Day" produced for My Songs was released on 31 December 2018. This version was first performed live in Times Square on the same day. A remixed version of "Desert Rose" and a newly recorded version of "Demolition Man" were made available to download on 28 March 2019.

The My Songs tour commenced on 28 May 2019 in Paris.

== Track listing ==
All tracks are written by Sting, except where noted.

No.	Title	Writer(s)	Producer(s)	Length
1.	"Brand New Day"		Dave Audé	3:56
2.	"Desert Rose"	Sting; Cheb Mami	Audé	3:56
3.	"If You Love Somebody Set Them Free"		Audé	4:35
4.	"Every Breath You Take"			4:16
5.	"Demolition Man"		Martin Kierszenbaum	4:17
6.	"Can't Stand Losing You"			2:49
7.	"Fields of Gold"			3:46
8.	"So Lonely"			4:08
9.	"Shape of My Heart"	Sting; Dominic Miller		4:43
10.	"Message in a Bottle"			4:46
11.	"Fragile"		Audé	3:52
12.	"Walking on the Moon"			4:16
13.	"Englishman in New York"		Audé	4:28
14.	"If I Ever Lose My Faith in You"		Audé	4:09
15.	"Roxanne" (live at the Olympia (Paris) April 2017)			2:57
Total length:				60:54

Deluxe edition
No.	Title	Length
16.	"Synchronicity II" (live)	4:59
17.	"Next to You" (live)	4:18
18.	"Spirits in the Material World" (live)	3:57
19.	"Fragile" (live)	4:00
Total length:		78:08

Deluxe edition – French edition only
No.	Title	Writer(s)	Length
20.	"Desert Rose" (Dave Audé Extended Remix)	Sting; Mami	4:00
Total length:			82:08

Deluxe edition – Japanese edition only
No.	Title	Length
20.	"I Can't Stop Thinking About You" (live)	3:43
Total length:		82:01

== Personnel ==
- Sting – vocals, bass (1, 2, 4–15), Roland VG-8 guitar synthesizer (1, 2), electric guitar (3), acoustic guitar (11), harmonica (14), saxophone (14)
- Dominic Miller – guitars (1, 2, 4–7, 9, 10, 12, 14, 15), vocals (15)
- Rufus Miller – guitars (4, 6, 9, 10, 12, 15), vocals (15)
- Jerry Fuentes – guitars (7, 8), backing vocals (7, 15), bass (8), percussion (15)
- BJ Cole – pedal steel guitar (1, 2)
- Paul Franklin – pedal steel guitar (14)
- Darryl Jones – bass (3)
- Kipper (Mark Eldridge) – keyboards (1, 2), drum programming (1, 2)
- Dave Audé – additional programming (1, 2, 3, 11, 13, 14), additional instruments (1), arrangements (1, 3, 11, 13)
- Jason Rebello – acoustic piano (1, 2), clavinet (1, 2)
- Don Blackman – Hammond organ (1, 2)
- Dave Hartley – Hammond organ (1, 2)
- Kenny Kirkland – keyboards (3, 11, 13)
- Danny Quatrochi – Synclavier (3), backing vocals (3)
- Jason Robinson – additional programming (3, 11)
- Martin Kierszenbaum – acoustic piano (4), keyboards (4), organ (5, 6, 8, 10)
- David Sancious – keyboards (7, 14)
- Kevon "Webbo" Webster – keyboards (9)
- Vinnie Colaiuta – drums (1, 2, 5, 7, 14)
- Manu Katché – drums (1, 2, 11, 13)
- Omar Hakim – drums (3)
- Josh Freese – drums (4, 6, 8, 10, 12)
- Andy Newmark – additional drums (11, 13)
- Mino Cinelu – percussion (1, 2, 11, 13), vocoder (13)
- Ettamri Mustapha – darbouka (2)
- Tony Lake – percussion (9)
- Stevie Wonder – harmonica (1)
- Larry Adler – chromatic harmonica (14)
- Branford Marsalis – clarinet (1, 2), percussion (3), saxophone (3, 11, 13)
- Dave Heath – flute (14)
- Richard Edwards – trombone (14)
- Mark Nightingale – trombone (14)
- Chris Botti – trumpet (1, 2)
- John Barclay – trumpet (14)
- Guy Barker – trumpet (14)
- Kathryn Tickell – Northumbrian pipes (1, 2, 14), fiddle (1, 2, 14)
- Farhat Bouallagui – string arrangements and conductor (2)
- Moulay Ahmed – violin (2)
- Kouider Berkan – violin (2)
- Salem Bnoumi – violin (2)
- Sameh Catalanm – violin (2)
- Danny Dunlap – strings (14)
- Sian Bell – cello (14)
- James Boyd – viola (14)
- Simon Fischer – violin (14)
- Kathryn Greeley – violin (14)
- Tawatha Agee – backing vocals (1, 2)
- Dennis Collins – backing vocals (1, 2)
- Joe Mendez – backing vocals (1, 2)
- Janice Pendarvis – backing vocals (1, 2, 3, 11, 13)
- Althea Rodgers – backing vocals (1, 2)
- Marlon Saunders – backing vocals (1, 2)
- Vaneese Thomas – backing vocals (1, 2)
- Darryl Tookes – backing vocals (1, 2)
- Ken Williams – backing vocals (1, 2)
- Cheb Mami – vocals (2)
- Jane Alexander – backing vocals (3)
- Stephanie Crewdson – backing vocals (3)
- Elliot Jones – backing vocals (3)
- Dolette McDonald – backing vocals (3, 11, 13)
- Vic Garbarini – backing vocals (3)
- Rosemary Purt – backing vocals (3)
- Pete Smith – backing vocals (3)
- Joe Sumner – backing vocals (3, 15)
- Kate Sumner – backing vocals (3)
- Mickey Sumner – backing vocals (3)
- The Nannies Chorus – backing vocals (3)
- Melissa Musique – backing vocals (9)
- Gene Noble – backing vocals (9)
- The Last Bandoleros [Jerry Fuentes, Derek James, Diego Navaira and Emilo Navaira] – backing vocals (10)
- Renée Geyer – backing vocals (11, 13)
- Vesta Williams – backing vocals (11, 13)
- Diego Navaira – backing vocals (15)
- David Foxxe – narrator (14)

== Charts ==
=== Weekly charts ===
Chart (2019–20)	Peak position
Australian Digital Albums (ARIA)	9
Austrian Albums (Ö3 Austria)	7
Belgian Albums (Ultratop Flanders)	20
Belgian Albums (Ultratop Wallonia)	8
Canadian Albums (Billboard)	89
Czech Albums (ČNS IFPI)	19
Dutch Albums (Album Top 100)	39
French Albums (SNEP)	2
German Albums (Offizielle Top 100)	4
Hungarian Albums (MAHASZ)	12
Irish Albums (IRMA)	81
Italian Albums (FIMI)	14
Japanese Albums (Oricon)	4
Polish Albums (ZPAV)	4
Portuguese Albums (AFP)	4
Slovak Albums (ČNS IFPI)	21
Scottish Albums (Official Charts)	15
Spanish Albums (PROMUSICAE)	17
Swiss Albums (Schweizer Hitparade)	5
UK Albums (Official Charts)	27
US Billboard 200	145
US Top Rock Albums (Billboard)	28

=== Year-end charts ===
Chart (2019)	Position
Belgian Albums (Ultratop Wallonia)	86
French Albums (SNEP)	37
Polish Albums (ZPAV)	96
Swiss Albums (Schweizer Hitparade)	92
Chart (2020)	Position
Polish Albums (ZPAV)	54

== Certifications ==
Region	Certification	Certified units/sales
France (SNEP)	Platinum	100,000^{‡}
Poland (ZPAV)	Platinum	20,000^{‡}
^{‡} Sales+streaming figures based on certification alone.

== Release history ==
Region	Date	Format	Label
United States	24 May 2019	CD; digital download	A&M
