= My Songs Tour =

2019–24 concert tour by Sting

- Tour by Sting
- Associated album: My Songs
- Start date: 28 May 2019
- End date: 3 August 2024
- Legs: 20
- No. of shows: 198 in Europe; 86 in North America; 16 in Asia; 1 in the Middle East; 4 in Africa; 11 in Oceania; 316 in total
- Website: www.sting.com/tour

Sting concert chronology
- 57th & 9th Tour (2017); My Songs Tour (2019–2024); ...

The My Songs Tour was a world tour by English singer-songwriter Sting, in support of his thirteenth solo studio album My Songs, released on 24 May 2019.

== Background ==
The tour began on 28 May 2019 at La Seine Musicale in Paris, France, and went on until 17 November 2019 at The Met in Philadelphia. The tour was due to resume in 2020 with a (rescheduled) 8-date residency from 15 August to 2 September at Caesars Palace in Las Vegas but was postponed and rescheduled to August 2020 and then to 2021 due to the COVID-19 pandemic.

Curiously, this tour was not renamed The Bridge Tour after the release in November 2021 of Sting's new studio album (of original material) The Bridge although the 2022 ongoing tour setlist does include up to 5 songs from the new studio album.

It was preceded by two pre-tour one-off shows on May 10 and 12, 2019, in Texas.

== Set list ==
This set list is representative of the performance on 2 July 2019 in Budapest, Hungary. It does not represent the set list at all concerts for the duration of the tour.

1. "Message in a Bottle"
2. "If I Ever Lose My Faith in You"
3. "Englishman in New York"
4. "If You Love Somebody Set Them Free"
5. "Every Little Thing She Does Is Magic"
6. "Brand New Day"
7. "Spirits in the Material World"
8. "Seven Days"
9. "Fields of Gold"
10. "Waiting for the Break of Day"
11. "Shape of My Heart"
12. "Wrapped Around Your Finger"
13. "Walking on the Moon"
14. "So Lonely"
15. "Desert Rose"
16. "Roxanne"
17. "Demolition Man"
18. "Can't Stand Losing You"
19. "Every Breath You Take"
  Encore
20. "King of Pain"
21. "Next to You"
22. "Fragile"

== Personnel ==
In August 2019, touring members of his band included:

- Dominic Miller: guitar
- Rufus Miller: guitar
- Josh Freese: drums
- Zach Jones: drums
- Kevon Webster: keyboards
- Shane Sager: harmonica
- Gene Noble, Melissa Musique: backing vocalists
- Ben Butler: guitar
- Frederic Renaudin : keyboards

== Tour dates ==
Date	City	Country	Venue
Europe
28 May 2019	Paris	France	La Seine Musicale
1 June 2019	Sofia	Bulgaria	Armeets Arena
2 June 2019	Skopje	North Macedonia	Philip II National Arena
4 June 2019	Ljubljana	Slovenia	Arena Stožice
6 June 2019	Hanover	Germany	Expo-Plaza
8 June 2019	Kaunas	Lithuania	Žalgiris Arena
10 June 2019	Riga	Latvia	Arena Riga
12 June 2019	Tallinn	Estonia	Saku Suurhall
13 June 2019	Helsinki	Finland	Kaisaniemi Park
15 June 2019 (Note: The 15 June 2019 concert in Beitostølen was part of Beitostølen Live.)	Beitostølen	Norway	Beitostølen Stadion
17 June 2019	Stockholm	Sweden	Gröna Lund
19 June 2019 (Note: The 19 June 2019 concert in Trondheim was part of The Big Challenge.)	Trondheim	Norway	Solsiden Trondheim
21 June 2019 (Note: The 21 June 2019 concert in Holstebro was part of Open Air Ved Teatret.)	Holstebro	Denmark	Musikteatret Holstebro
22 June 2019 (Note: The 22 June 2019 concert in Groningen was part of Stadspark Live.)	Groningen	Netherlands	Stadspark Groningen
23 June 2019 (Note: The 23 June 2019 concert in Forchheim was part of Open Air Forchheim.)	Forchheim	Germany	Jahngelände Forchheim
25 June 2019	Mönchengladbach	Germany	SparkassenPark
26 June 2019	Lingen	Germany	Platz vor der EmslandArena
28 June 2019 (Note: The 28 June 2019 concert in Montreux was part of Montreux Jazz Festival.)	Montreux	Switzerland	Auditorium Stravinski
30 June 2019	Bratislava	Slovakia	Ondrej Nepela Arena
2 July 2019	Budapest	Hungary	László Papp Budapest Sports Arena
4 July 2019	Graz	Austria	Messe Congress Graz
5 July 2019 (Note: The 5 July 2019 concert in Klam was part of Klam Live.)	Klam	Austria	Clam Castle
6 July 2019	Halle	Germany	Freilichtbühne Peißnitz
17 July 2019 (Note: The 17 July 2019 concert in Lyon was part of Nuits de Fourvière.)	Lyon	France	Théâtre Antique de Fourvière
19 July 2019 (Note: The 19 July 2019 concert in Calella de Palafrugell was part of Cap Roig Festival.)	Calella de Palafrugell	Spain	Jardí Botànic de Cap Roig
21 July 2019 (Note: The 21 July 2019 concert in Vila Nova de Gaia was part of Festival Marés Vivas.)	Vila Nova de Gaia	Portugal	Praia do Cabedelo do Douro
22 July 2019	Úbeda	Spain	Auditorio del Recinto Ferial
23 July 2019 (Note: The 23 July 2019 concert in Marbella was part of Starlite Festival.)	Marbella	Spain	Auditorio La Cantera de Nagüeles
25 July 2019 (Note: The 25 July 2019 concert in Marciac was part of Jazz in Marciac.)	Marciac	France	Stade Municipal
26 July 2019 (Note: The 26 July 2019 concert in Carcassonne was part of Festival de Carcassonne.)	Carcassonne	France	Théâtre Jean-Deschamps
27 July 2019 (Note: The 27 July 2019 concert in Vitrolles was part of Jardin Sonore Festival.)	Vitrolles	France	Domaine de Fontblanche
29 July 2019 (Note: The 29 July 2019 concert in Lucca was part of Lucca Summer Festival.)	Lucca	Italy	Piazza Napoleone
30 July 2019	Padua	Italy	Gran Teatro Geox
1 August 2019 (Note: The 1 August 2019 concert in Colmar was part of Festival de la Foire aux Vins d'Alsace.)	Colmar	France	Theatre De Plein Air
2 August 2019 (Note: The 2 August 2019 concert in Monte Carlo was part of Sporting Summer Festival.)	Monte Carlo	Monaco	Salle des Étoiles Sporting Club
North America
23 August 2019 (Note: The 23 and 24 August 2019 concerts at the Highland Park were part of Ravinia Festival.)	Highland Park	United States	Ravinia Pavilion
24 August 2019	Highland Park	United States	Ravinia Pavilion
26 August 2019	Vienna	United States	Filene Center at Wolf Trap
27 August 2019	Vienna	United States	Filene Center at Wolf Trap
28 August 2019	Vienna	United States	Filene Center at Wolf Trap
1 September 2019 (Note: The 1 September 2019 concert in Snowmass Village was part of JAS Aspen Snowmass Labor Day Festival.)	Aspen	United States	Town Park
2 September 2019	Taos	United States	Kit Carson Park
Asia
5 October 2019 (Note: The 5 October 2019 concert in Seoul was part of Slow Life Slow.)	Seoul	South Korea	88 Garden Stage
7 October 2019	Fukuoka	Japan	Fukuoka Kokusai Center
9 October 2019	Chiba	Japan	Makuhari Messe
10 October 2019	Chiba	Japan	Makuhari Messe
13 October 2019 (Note: The 13 October 2019 concert in Sendai was postponed from 12 October 2019 due to Typhoon Hagibis.)	Sendai	Japan	Xebio Arena Sendai
15 October 2019	Osaka	Japan	Intex Osaka
Europe
18 October 2019	Paris	France	AccorHotels Arena
19 October 2019	Orléans	France	Zénith d'Orléans
20 October 2019	Lille	France	Zénith de Lille
22 October 2019	Bordeaux	France	Arkéa Arena
23 October 2019	Nantes	France	Zénith de Nantes Métropole
25 October 2019	Lyon	France	Halle Tony Garnier
26 October 2019	Nice	France	Palais Nikaïa
28 October 2019	Grenoble	France	Le Summum
29 October 2019	Milan	Italy	Mediolanum Forum
31 October 2019	Berlin	Germany	Mercedes-Benz Arena
2 November 2019	Kraków	Poland	Tauron Arena Kraków
North America
8 November 2019	Jacksonville	United States	Daily's Place
9 November 2019	Hollywood	United States	Hard Rock Live
15 November 2019	Atlantic City	United States	Hard Rock Live Etess Arena
17 November 2019	Philadelphia	United States	The Met
Europe
27 September 2021	Taormina	Italy	Teatro Antico di Taormina
30 September 2021	Athens	Greece	Odeon of Herodes Atticus
1 October 2021	Athens	Greece	Odeon of Herodes Atticus
My Songs: Las Vegas Residency (Note: The Las Vegas residency was originally scheduled to take place on 22, 23, 27, 28, 29 30 May 2020 and 3, 5, 6 June 2020 then 29, 30 January 2021 and 3, 5, 6, 10, 12, 13 February 2021.)
29 October 2021	Las Vegas	United States	The Colosseum at Caesars Palace
30 October 2021	Las Vegas	United States	The Colosseum at Caesars Palace
3 November 2021	Las Vegas	United States	The Colosseum at Caesars Palace
5 November 2021	Las Vegas	United States	The Colosseum at Caesars Palace
6 November 2021	Las Vegas	United States	The Colosseum at Caesars Palace
10 November 2021	Las Vegas	United States	The Colosseum at Caesars Palace
12 November 2021	Las Vegas	United States	The Colosseum at Caesars Palace
13 November 2021	Las Vegas	United States	The Colosseum at Caesars Palace
Europe
24 March 2022	Rouen	France	Zénith de la Métropole Rouen Normandie
25 March 2022	Amsterdam	Netherlands	AFAS Live
26 March 2022	Mannheim	Germany	SAP Arena
15 April 2022 (Note: The London Palladium residency was originally scheduled to take place on 15, 17, 18, 19, 21, 22 September 2020, then 3, 4, 5, 7, 8, 10 June 2021)	London	England	London Palladium
16 April 2022	London	England	London Palladium
17 April 2022	London	England	London Palladium
19 April 2022	London	England	London Palladium
20 April 2022	London	England	London Palladium
21 April 2022	London	England	London Palladium
North America
2 May 2022	Halifax	Canada	Scotiabank Centre
4 May 2022	Ottawa	Canada	Canadian Tire Centre
5 May 2022	Montreal	Canada	Bell Centre
7 May 2022	Grand Rapids	United States	Van Andel Arena
8 May 2022	Carmel	United States	The Palladium at the Center
10 May 2022 (Note: The 10 May 2022 concert in Philadelphia was originally scheduled to take place on 1 May 2020, then 23 November 2020, then 7 September 2021.)	Philadelphia	United States	The Met
11 May 2022 (Note: The 10 May 2022 concert in Philadelphia was originally scheduled to take place on 2 May 2020, then 24 November 2020, then 8 September 2021.)	Philadelphia	United States	The Met
13 May 2022	Atlantic City	United States	Hard Rock Live Etess Arena
14 May 2022	Atlantic City	United States	Hard Rock Live Etess Arena
15 May 2022	Uncasville	United States	Mohegan Sun Arena
18 May 2022	Nashville	United States	Ascend Amphitheater
20 May 2022	Jacksonville	United States	Daily's Place
21 May 2022	Tampa	United States	Hard Rock Live Tampa
22 May 2022	Hollywood	United States	Hard Rock Live
My Songs: Las Vegas Residency (Note: The Las Vegas residency was originally scheduled to take place on 15, 19, 21, 22, 26, 28, 29 August, 2 September 2020, then 7, 8, 12, 14, 15, 19, 21, 22 May 2021)
3 June 2022	Las Vegas	United States	The Colosseum at Caesars Palace
4 June 2022	Las Vegas	United States	The Colosseum at Caesars Palace
8 June 2022	Las Vegas	United States	The Colosseum at Caesars Palace
10 June 2022	Las Vegas	United States	The Colosseum at Caesars Palace
11 June 2022	Las Vegas	United States	The Colosseum at Caesars Palace
15 June 2022	Las Vegas	United States	The Colosseum at Caesars Palace
17 June 2022	Las Vegas	United States	The Colosseum at Caesars Palace
18 June 2022	Las Vegas	United States	The Colosseum at Caesars Palace
Europe
21 June 2022 (Note: The 21 June 2022 concert in Gothenburg was originally scheduled to take place on 21 June 2020, then 18 June 2021.)	Gothenburg	Sweden	Trädgårdsföreningen
22 June 2022	Bergen	Norway	Bergenhus Fortress
24 June 2022 (Note: The 24 June 2022 concert in Horsens was originally scheduled to take place at Lunden Horsens on 23 June 2020, then 19 June 2021.)	Horsens	Denmark	Horsens Statsfængsel
25 June 2022 (Note: The 25 June 2022 concert in Hamburg was originally scheduled to take place on 20 June 2020, then 20 June 2021.)	Hamburg	Germany	Hamburg Stadtpark
26 June 2022 (Note: The 26 June 2022 concert in Neu-Ulm was originally scheduled to take place on 27 June 2020, then 26 June 2021.)	Neu-Ulm	Germany	Wiley Sportpark
28 June 2022 (Note: The 28 June 2022 concert in Chambord was originally scheduled to take place on 1 July 2020, then 1 July 2021.)	Chambord	France	Château de Chambord
29 June 2022 (Note: The 29 June 2022 concert in Saint-Vulbas was part of Le Printemps de Pérouges. Originally scheduled to take place on 25 June 2020, then 30 June 2021.)	Saint-Vulbas	France	Polo Club de la Plaine de l'Ain
1 July 2022 (Note: The 1 July 2022 concert in Arras was part of Main Square Festival. Originally scheduled to take place 3 July 2020, then 2 July 2021.)	Arras	France	Citadelle d'Arras
3 July 2022 (Note: The 3 July 2022 concert in Nancy was part originally scheduled to take place on 13 July 2020, then 13 July 2021.)	Nancy	France	Amphithéâtre de Zénith de Nancy
4 July 2022 (Note: The 4 July 2022 concert in Nîmes was part of Festival de Nîmes. Originally scheduled to take place on 18 June 2020, then 4 July 2021.)	Nîmes	France	Arènes de Nîmes
9 July 2022 (Note: The 9 July 2022 concert in Weert was part of Bospop. Originally scheduled to take place on 14 July 2019, then 10 July 2020, then 9 July 2021.)	Weert	Netherlands	Festivalterrein Weert-Noord
10 July 2022 (Note: The 10 July 2022 concert in Bonn was part of KUNST!Rasen. Originally scheduled to take place on 15 July 2019, then 9 July 2020, then 11 July 2021.)	Bonn	Germany	Kunstrasen Bonn
12 July 2022 (Note: The 12 July 2022 concert in Saint-Malô-du-Bois was part of Festival de Poupet. Originally scheduled to take place on 16 July 2020.)	Saint-Malô-du-Bois	France	Théâtre de Verdure
13 July 2022 (Note: The 13 July 2022 concert in Ghent was part of Gent Jazz Festival. Originally scheduled to take place on 8 July 2019, then 14 July 2020, then 14 July 2021.)	Ghent	Belgium	de Bijloke
15 July 2022 (Note: The 15 July 2022 concert in Ghent was originally scheduled to take place on 7 July 2021.)	Eisenstadt	Austria	Schlosspark Eisenstadt
16 July 2022 (Note: The 16 July 2022 concert in Munich was part of Tollwood Sommerfestival. Originally scheduled to take place on 10 July 2019, then 6 July 2020, then 6 July 2021.)	Munich	Germany	Tollwood Musik-Arena
17 July 2022 (Note: The 17 July 2022 concert in Stuttgart was part of Jazzopen Stuttgart. Originally scheduled to take place on 11 July 2019, then 19 July 2020, then 18 July 2021.)	Stuttgart	Germany	Schlossplatz
19 July 2022 (Note: The 19 July 2022 concert in Parma was part of Parma Città della Musica. Originally scheduled to take place at Parco della Cittadella on 23 July 2020, then 20 July 2021.)	Parma	Italy	Parco Ducale
20 July 2022 (Note: The 20 July 2022 concert in Nyon was part of Paléo Festival.)	Nyon	Switzerland	Plaine de l'Asse
22 July 2022 (Note: The 22 July 2022 concert in Tüßling was originally scheduled to take place on 20 July 2020, then 22 July 2021.)	Tüßling	Germany	Schlosspark Tüssling
23 July 2022 (Note: The 23 July 2022 concert in Würzburg was originally scheduled to take place on 11 July 2020, the 10 July 2021.)	Würzburg	Germany	Residenzplatz
24 July 2022 (Note: The 24 July 2022 concert in Mainz was originally scheduled to take place on 17 July 2021.)	Mainz	Germany	Volkspark
26 July 2022 (Note: The 26 July 2022 concert in Erfurt was originally scheduled to take place on 15 June 2020, then 16 June 2021.)	Erfurt	Germany	Messe Erfurt
27 July 2022 (Note: The 27 July 2022 concert in Halle was originally scheduled to take place on 28 June 2020, then 27 June 2021.)	Halle	Germany	OWL Arena
28 July 2022 (Note: The 28 July 2022 concert in Berlin was part of Citadel Music Festival. Originally scheduled to take place on 29 June 2020, then 28 July 2021.)	Berlin	Germany	Zitadelle Spandau
30 July 2022 (Note: The 30 July 2022 concert in Warsaw was originally scheduled to take place on 25 July 2020, then 24 July 2021.)	Warsaw	Poland	PGE Narodowy
31 July 2022 (Note: The 31 July 2022 concert in Brno was originally scheduled to take place on 12 July 2019, then 5 July 2020, then 25 July 2021.)	Brno	Czech Republic	Zámecký Park
3 August 2022 (Note: The 3 August 2022 concert in Murcia was originally scheduled to take place on 29 July 2020, then 28 July 2021.)	Murcia	Spain	Plaza de Toros de Murcia
4 August 2022 (Note: The 4 August 2022 concert in Cádiz was part of Concert Music Festival. Originally scheduled to take place on 30 July 2020, then 29 July 2021.)	Cádiz	Spain	Poblado de Sancti Petri
6 August 2022 (Note: The 6 August 2022 concert in Vigo was originally scheduled to take place on 31 July 2021.)	Vigo	Spain	Auditorio de Castrelos
8 August 2022 (Note: The 8 August 2022 concert in Calella de Palafrugell was part of Cap Roig Festival.)	Calella de Palafrugell	Spain	Jardí Botànic de Cap Roig
North America
25 August 2022	London	Canada	Budweiser Gardens
27 August 2022 (Note: The 27 and 28 August 2022 concerts at the Highland Park were part of Ravinia Festival.)	Highland Park	United States	Ravinia Pavilion
28 August 2022	Highland Park	United States	Ravinia Pavilion
31 August 2022	Virginia Beach	United States	Veterans United Home Loans Amphitheater
2 September 2022	Vienna	United States	Filene Center at Wolf Trap
3 September 2022	Vienna	United States	Filene Center at Wolf Trap
4 September 2022	Vienna	United States	Filene Center at Wolf Trap
6 September 2022	Syracuse	United States	St. Joseph's Health Amphitheater
7 September 2022	Saratoga Springs	United States	Saratoga Performing Arts Center
9 September 2022	Bridgeport	United States	Hartford HealthCare Amphitheater
10 September 2022	Gilford	United States	Bank of New Hampshire Pavilion
11 September 2022	Bangor	United States	Maine Savings Amphitheater
13 September 2022	Moncton	Canada	Avenir Centre
16 September 2022	St. John's	Canada	Mary Brown's Centre
Europe
20 September 2022 (Note: The 20 September 2022 concert in Tampere was originally scheduled to take place on 3 March 2022.)	Tampere	Finland	Nokia Arena
22 September 2022	Helsinki	Finland	Jäähalli
24 September 2022 (Note: The 24 September 2022 concert in Riga was originally scheduled to take place on 2 October 2020, then 5 March 2022.)	Riga	Latvia	Arena Riga
25 September 2022 (Note: The 25 September 2022 concert in Kaunas was originally scheduled to take place on 9 March 2022.)	Kaunas	Lithuania	Žalgiris Arena
28 September 2022 (Note: The 28 September 2022 concert in Košice was originally scheduled to take place on 8 October 2020, then 4 October 2021.)	Košice	Slovakia	Steel Aréna
29 September 2022 (Note: The 29 September 2022 concert in Debrecen was originally scheduled to take place on 8 October 2020, then 4 October 2021.)	Debrecen	Hungary	Főnix Hall
30 September 2022 (Note: The 30 September 2022 concert in Cluj-Napoca was originally scheduled to take place on 15 March 2022.)	Cluj-Napoca	Romania	BTarena
2 October 2022 (Note: The 2 October 2022 concert in Sarajevo was originally scheduled to take place on 19 March 2022.)	Sarajevo	Bosnia and Herzegovina	Zetra Olympic Hall
5 October 2022	Reims	France	Reims Arena
7 October 2022	Montpellier	France	Sud de France Arena
10 October 2022 (Note: The 10 October 2022 concert in Zürich was originally scheduled to take place on 18 October 2020, then 15 October 2021.)	Zürich	Switzerland	Hallenstadion
11 October 2022	Paris	France	Accor Arena
14 October 2022 (Note: The 14 October 2022 concert in Dijon was originally scheduled to take place on 21 October 2020, then 1 April 2022.)	Dijon	France	Zénith de Dijon
16 October 2022 (Note: The 16 October 2022 concert in Caen was originally scheduled to take place on 21 October 2020, then 9 April 2022.)	Caen	France	Zénith de Caen
17 October 2022	Brussels	Belgium	Forest National
19 October 2022	Oslo	Norway	Oslo Spektrum
20 October 2022	Stockholm	Sweden	Avicii Arena
21 October 2022	Copenhagen	Denmark	Royal Arena
23 October 2022	Lille	France	Zénith de Lille
25 October 2022	Milan	Italy	Mediolanum Forum
27 October 2022 (Note: The 27 October 2022 concert in Budapest was originally scheduled to take place on 21 March 2022.)	Budapest	Hungary	László Papp Budapest Sports Arena
28 October 2022	Prague	Czech Republic	O_{2} Arena
30 October 2022	Bratislava	Slovakia	Ondrej Nepela Arena
31 October 2022	Zagreb	Croatia	Arena Zagreb
2 November 2022	Clermont-Ferrand	France	Zénith d'Auvergne
3 November 2022	Bordeaux	France	Arkéa Arena
5 November 2022 (Note: The 5 November 2022 concert in Saint Etienne was originally scheduled to take place on 3 April 2022.)	Saint-Étienne	France	Zénith Saint-Étienne Métropole
6 November 2022 (Note: The 6 November 2022 concert in Toulouse was originally scheduled to take place on 12 October 2020, then 6 April 2022.)	Toulouse	France	Zénith de Toulouse Métropole
8 November 2022 (Note: The 8 November 2022 concert in Aix-en-Provence was originally scheduled to take place on 11 October 2020, then 7 April 2022.)	Aix-en-Provence	France	Aréna du Pays d'Aix
10 November 2022	Poitiers	France	Arena Futuroscope
12 November 2022 (Note: The 12 November 2022 concert in Esch-sur-Alzette was originally scheduled to take place on 2 July 2020, then 14 June 2021, then 29 March 2022.)	Esch-sur-Alzette	Luxembourg	Rockhal
14 November 2022	Lausanne	Switzerland	Vaudoise Aréna
15 November 2022 (Note: The 15 November 2022 concert in Strasbourg was originally scheduled to take place on 19 October 2020, then 4 April 2022.)	Strasbourg	France	Zénith de Strasbourg
17 November 2022	Amsterdam	Netherlands	AFAS Live
Middle East
27 January 2023	Abu Dhabi	United Arab Emirates	Etihad Arena
Africa
1 February 2023	Cape Town	South Africa	Grand Arena at GrandWest
2 February 2023	Cape Town	South Africa	Grand Arena at GrandWest
4 February 2023	Pretoria	South Africa	Sun Bet Arena at Time Square
5 February 2023	Pretoria	South Africa	Sun Bet Arena at Time Square
Oceania
10 February 2023	Perth	Australia	Kings Park
11 February 2023	Perth	Australia	Kings Park
15 February 2023	Sydney	Australia	Aware Super Theatre
16 February 2023	Sydney	Australia	Aware Super Theatre
18 February 2023 (Note: The 18, 19, 25, 26 February concerts were part of A Day on the Green.)	Pokolbin	Australia	Bimbadgen Winery
19 February 2023	Mount Cotton	Australia	Sirromet Wines
21 February 2023	Adelaide	Australia	Adelaide Entertainment Centre
23 February 2023	Melbourne	Australia	Rod Laver Arena
25 February 2023	Geelong	Australia	Mt Duneed Estate
26 February 2023	Bowral	Australia	Centennial Vineyards
1 March 2023	Christchurch	New Zealand	Christchurch Arena
Asia
8 March 2023	Hiroshima	Japan	Hiroshima Sun Plaza
9 March 2023	Osaka	Japan	Osaka-jō Hall
11 March 2023	Tokyo	Japan	Ariake Arena
12 March 2023	Tokyo	Japan	Ariake Arena
14 March 2023	Nagoya	Japan	Nippon Gaishi Hall
17 March 2023	Manila	Philippines	Theatre at Solaire
18 March 2023	Manila	Philippines	Theatre at Solaire
20 March 2023	Kuala Lumpur	Malaysia	Plenary Hall
22 March 2023	Singapore		The Star Performing Arts Centre
My Songs: Las Vegas Residency
1 April 2023	Las Vegas	United States	The Colosseum at Caesars Palace
2 April 2023	Las Vegas	United States	The Colosseum at Caesars Palace
5 April 2023	Las Vegas	United States	The Colosseum at Caesars Palace
7 April 2023	Las Vegas	United States	The Colosseum at Caesars Palace
8 April 2023	Las Vegas	United States	The Colosseum at Caesars Palace
9 April 2023	Las Vegas	United States	The Colosseum at Caesars Palace
Europe
1 June 2023	Bilbao	Spain	Bilbao Arena
3 June 2023	Tenerife	Spain	Estadio Heliodoro Rodríguez López
4 June 2023	Gran Canaria	Spain	Plaza de la Música
6 June 2023	Bruchsal	Germany	Schloss Bruchsal
8 June 2023 (Note: The 8 June 2023 concert in Funen is part of Heartland Festival.)	Funen	Denmark	Egeskov Castle
10 June 2023 (Note: The 10 June 2023 concert in Vaulen is part of Vaulen Open Air.)	Stavanger	Norway	Vaulen
13 June 2023	Kassel	Germany	Friedrichsplatz
14 June 2023	Coburg	Germany	Schlossplatz Coburg
16 June 2023	Halle	Germany	Peißnitzinsel
17 June 2023	Wiesbaden	Germany	Brita-Arena
20 June 2023	Mönchengladbach	Germany	SparkassenPark
24 June 2023	Bedford	England	Bedford Park
25 June 2023	Scarborough	England	Scarborough Open Air Theatre
28 June 2023	Dublin	Ireland	Malahide Castle
30 June 2023 (Note: The 30 June 2023 concert in Lytham St Annes is part of Lytham Festival.)	Lytham St Annes	England	Lytham Green
2 July 2023	Cardiff	Wales	Cardiff Castle
4 July 2023	Halifax	England	Piece Hall
6 July 2023	Orléans	France	Zénith d'Orléans
7 July 2023 (Note: The 7 July 2023 concert in Argelès-sur-Mer is part of Les Deferlantes Festival.)	Argelès-sur-Mer	France	Parc de Valmy
9 July 2023 (Note: The 9 July 2023 concert in Hérouville-Saint-Clair is part of Beauregard Festival.)	Hérouville-Saint-Clair	France	Château de Beauregard
11 July 2023	Mantua	Italy	Piazza Sordello
12 July 2023 (Note: The 12 July 2023 concert in Turin was originally scheduled to take place on 22 October 2020, then 2 April 2022 at Pala Alpitour.)	Turin	Italy	Sonic Park Stupinigi
14 July 2023	Rome	Italy	Sala Santa Cecilia
16 July 2023	Klagenfurt	Austria	28 Black Arena
17 July 2023	Vienna	Austria	Wiener Stadthalle
19 July 2023 (Note: The 19 July 2023 concert in Pardubice was originally scheduled to take place on 18 July 2023.)	Pardubice	Czech Republic	Enteria Arena
20 July 2023	Kraków	Poland	Tauron Arena Kraków
22 July 2023 (Note: The 22 July 2023 concert in Saint-Julien-en-Genevois is part of Festival Guitare en Scene.)	Saint-Julien-en-Genevois	France	Stade des Burgondes
23 July 2023 (Note: The 23 July 2023 concert in Monte Carlo is part of Sporting Summer Festival.)	Monte Carlo	Monaco	Salle des Étoiles Sporting Club
25 July 2023	Orange	France	Théâtre Antique d'Orange
North America
1 September 2023	Vienna	United States	Filene Center at Wolf Trap
2 September 2023	Vienna	United States	Filene Center at Wolf Trap
3 September 2023	Atlantic City	United States	Hard Rock Live Etess Arena
5 September 2023	Toronto	Canada	Budweiser Stage
7 September 2023	Boston	United States	MGM Music Hall at Fenway
8 September 2023	Wantagh	United States	Northwell Health at Jones Beach Theater
12 September 2023	Hollywood	United States	Hard Rock Live
13 September 2023	Hollywood	United States	Hard Rock Live
15 September 2023	Atlanta	United States	Cadence Bank Amphitheatre
17 September 2023	Austin	United States	Moody Center
20 September 2023	Morrison	United States	Red Rocks Amphitheatre
21 September 2023	Morrison	United States	Red Rocks Amphitheatre
23 September 2023	West Valley City	United States	USANA Amphitheatre
26 September 2023	Portland	United States	Moda Center
27 September 2023	Seattle	United States	Climate Pledge Arena
29 September 2023	Vancouver	Canada	Rogers Arena
1 October 2023	Reno	United States	Grand Theatre at The Grand Sierra
2 October 2023	Concord	United States	Concord Pavilion
4 October 2023	San Diego	United States	Cal Coast Credit Union Open Air Theatre
5 October 2023	Palm Desert	United States	Acrisure Arena
7 October 2023	Los Angeles	United States	Hollywood Bowl
9 October 2023	Phoenix	United States	Arizona Financial Theatre
12 October 2023	Rogers	United States	Walmart Arkansas Music Pavilion
14 October 2023	Irving	United States	Pavilion at Toyota Music Factory
15 October 2023	The Woodlands	United States	Cynthia Woods Mitchell Pavilion
Europe
23 November 2023 (Note: The 23 November 2023 concert in Oberhausen was originally scheduled to take place on 14 October 2020, then 11 April 2022, then 24 November 2022.)	Oberhausen	Germany	Rudolf Weber-Arena
25 November 2023	Brussels	Belgium	Forest National
27 November 2023 (Note: The 27 November 2023 concert in Oberhausen was originally scheduled to take place on 15 October 2020, then 30 March 2022, then 20 November 2022.)	Hamburg	Germany	Barclays Arena
28 November 2023 (Note: The 28 November 2023 concert in Leipzig was originally scheduled to take place on 16 October 2020, then 28 March 2022, then 21 November 2022.)	Leipzig	Germany	Quarterback Immobilien Arena
30 November 2023 (Note: The 30 November 2023 concert in Amsterdam was originally scheduled to take place on 17 November 2022.)	Amsterdam	Netherlands	AFAS Live
1 December 2023	Amsterdam	Netherlands	AFAS Live
3 December 2023	Paris	France	Accor Arena
4 December 2023 (Note: The 4 December 2023 concert in Cologne was originally scheduled to take place on 15 June 2020, then 15 June 2021, then 13 April 2022, then 23 November 2022.)	Cologne	Germany	Lanxess Arena
6 December 2023	Nuremberg	Germany	Arena Nürnberger Versicherung
7 December 2023	Hanover	Germany	ZAG-Arena
9 December 2023	Esch-sur-Alzette	Luxembourg	Rockhal
11 December 2023	Milan	Italy	Mediolanum Forum
13 December 2023	Lyon	France	LDLC Arena
15 December 2023	Madrid	Spain	IFEMA Madrid
16 December 2023	Pamplona	Spain	Navarra Arena
Asia
27 January 2024 (Note: The 27-28 January 2024 concert in Mumbai is part of Lollapalooza India. Date to be confirmed.)	Mumbai	India	Mahalaxmi Racecourse
Europe
25 May 2024 (Note: The 25 May 2024 concert in Dresden is part of the Dresdner Musikfestspiele, postponed from 12 June 2020.)	Dresden	Germany	Messe Dresden
27 May 2024	Zagreb	Croatia	Arena Zagreb
29 May 2024	Ljubljana	Slovenia	Arena Stožice
31 May 2024	Budapest	Hungary	László Papp Budapest Sports Arena
1 June 2024	Bratislava	Slovakia	Ondrej Nepela Arena
4 June 2024	Plzeň	Czech Republic	Amphitheatre Lochotín
6 June 2024	Gdańsk	Poland	Ergo Arena
7 June 2024	Łódź	Poland	Atlas Arena
9 June 2024	Kaunas	Lithuania	Žalgiris Arena
10 June 2024 (Note: The 10 June 2024 concert is part of Tartu 2024 - European Capital of Culture main programme.)	Tartu	Estonia	Tartu Song Festival Grounds
14 June 2024 (Note: The 14, 22 and 23 June concerts are part of Forest Live.)	Cheshire	England	Delamere Forest
16 June 2024 (Note: The 16 June 2024 concert in Plymouth is part of Plymouth Summer Sessions.)	Plymouth	England	Plymouth Hoe
18 June 2024	Cork	Ireland	Musgrave Park
19 June 2024 (Note: The 19 June 2024 concert in Belfast is part of Belsonic.)	Belfast	Northern Ireland	Ormeau Park
22 June 2024	Suffolk	England	Thetford Forest
23 June 2024	Mansfield	England	Sherwood Pines Forest Park
25 June 2024 (Note: The 25 June 2024 concert in Fontainebleau was scheduled to be part of FBLO Festival. Previously scheduled for 18 June 2023.)	Fontainebleau	France	Parc du Château de Fontainebleau
10 July 2024 (Note: The 11 July 2024 concert in La Rochelle is part of Les Francofolies de La Rochelle.)	La Rochelle	France	Esplanade Saint Jean d'Acre
11 July 2024 (Note: The 11 July 2024 concert in Brive-la-Gaillarde is part of Lovely Brive Festival.)	Brive-la-Gaillarde	France	Parc des Trois Provinces
12 July 2024 (Note: The 12 July 2024 concert in Carhaix-Plouguer is part of Vieilles Charrues Festival.)	Carhaix-Plouguer	France	La Prairie de Kerampuilh
16 July 2024	Toulon	France	Zénith de Toulon
19 July 2024 (Note: The 19 July 2024 concert in Nieuwpoort is part of Beach Festival.)	Nieuwpoort	Belgium	Maritiem Park
20 July 2024	Fulda	Germany	Domplatz Fulda
23 July 2024	Salem	Germany	Schloss Salem
24 July 2024	Füssen	Germany	Barockgarten am Festspielhaus Neuschwanstein
27 July 2024 (Note: The 27 July 2024 concert in Lingen was postponed from 22 June 2023 due to bad weather.)	Lingen	Germany	Platz vor der EmslandArena
28 July 2024 (Note: The 28 July 2024 concert in Stuttgart is part of Jazzopen Stuttgart.)	Stuttgart	Germany	Schlossplatz
30 July 2024 (Note: The 30 July 2024 concert in Carcassonne was part of Festival de Carcassonne.)	Carcassonne	France	Théâtre Jean-Deschamps
1 August 2024 (Note: The 1 August 2024 concert in Corsica was part of AIO Festival.)	Corsica	France	Théâtre de Verdure du Casone
3 August 2024	Pula	Italy	Forte Arena

== Cancelled dates ==
Date	City	Country	Venue	Reason
2 October 2019	Quezon City	Philippines	Araneta Coliseum	Scheduling conflicts.
26 July 2020	Linz	Austria	Domplatz	COVID-19 pandemic.
2 August 2020 (Note: The 2 August 2020 concert in Mérida was scheduled to be part of Stone & Music Mérida.)	Mérida	Spain	Albergue Municipal El Prado	COVID-19 pandemic.
25 September 2020	Yekaterinburg	Russia	Ekaterinburg Expo	Russian invasion of Ukraine.
27 September 2020	Kazan	Russia	Tatneft Arena	Russian invasion of Ukraine.
29 September 2020	Moscow	Russia	Megasport Sport Palace	Russian invasion of Ukraine.
30 September 2020	Saint Petersburg	Russia	Ice Palace	Russian invasion of Ukraine.
4 October 2020	Minsk	Belarus	Minsk-Arena	Russian invasion of Ukraine.
6 October 2020	Kyiv	Ukraine	Palace of Sports	Russian invasion of Ukraine.
4 March 2023	Napier	New Zealand	Mission Estate Winery	Cyclone Gabrielle.
