= Nada como el sol =

...Nada como el sol

EP by Sting
- Released: 16 February 1988
- Genre: Soft rock
- Length: 24:09
- Language: Spanish; Portuguese
- Label: A&M
- Producer: Bryan Loren, Jose L. Quintana, Neil Dorfsman

Sting chronology
...Nothing Like the Sun (1987)	...Nada como el sol (1988)	The Soul Cages (1991)

Nada como el sol is an extended play by English musician Sting, containing five songs from his second solo album ...Nothing Like the Sun sung in Spanish and Portuguese and published in 1988. It therefore contains versions sung in Spanish of the following four songs: "Little Wing" by Jimi Hendrix titled here "Mariposa Libre"; "Fragile" retitled "Fragilidad"; "We'll Be Together" whose title becomes "Si estamos juntos"; "They Dance Alone" translates to "Ellas danzan solas (Cueca solas)"; and "Fragile" performed also in Portuguese becomes "Frágil". The same musicians as on the original English versions can be found on this EP.

== Reception ==
Professional ratings
Review scores
Source	Rating
AllMusic	2/5 stars

AllMusic wrote "This was a well-done project -- the translations are good and Sting manages the Spanish and Portuguese [sic] pronunciations well."

== Track listing ==
1. Mariposa Libre (Jimi Hendrix, Roberto Livi) – 4:54 - Little Wing
2. Frágil [Portuguese] (Liluca, Sting) – 3:50 - Fragile
3. Si Estamos Juntos (Livi, Sting) – 4:16 - We'll be Together
4. Ellas Danzan Solas (Cueca Solas) (Livi, Sting) – 7:17 - They Dance Alone
5. Fragilidad [Spanish] (Livi, Sting) – 3:52 - Fragile
