= Demolition Man =

Demolition Man may refer to:

- "Demolition Man" (song), a song released in two 1981 versions, by Grace Jones and by The Police, and later in 1993 as the title track for the film Demolition Man
- Demolition Man (film), a 1993 film starring Sylvester Stallone and Wesley Snipes
  - Demolition Man (soundtrack), a 1993 soundtrack album from the film, by Elliot Goldenthal
  - Demolition Man (album), an EP by Sting released in conjunction with the 1993 film
  - Demolition Man (pinball), a pinball machine by Williams based on the film
  - Demolition Man (video game), a 1994 video game based on the film
- Demolition Man (character), a fictional character in the Marvel Comics universe
- Demolition Man (TV series), an Australian reality television series
- "Demolition Man", a song by Def Leppard from Euphoria
- "Demolition Man", a song by Drug Church from Prude

== Nicknames ==
- Tony Dolan (born 1964), English musician
- Azahari Husin (1957–2005), Malaysian terrorist bombmaker
- Alistair Overeem (born 1980), Dutch mixed martial artist
- Darren Webster (born 1968), English darts player

== See also ==
- The Demolished Man, a 1953 science-fiction novel by Alfred Bester
- "Demoman", a playable class in the Team Fortress video games
