= For Her Love =

2021 song by Sting

Song by Sting

from the album The Bridge
- Released: 19 November 2021
- Genre: Pop
- Length: 3:45
- Label: A&M; Cherrytree; Interscope
- Songwriters: Sting; Martin Kierszenbaum
- Producers: Martin Kierszenbaum; Maya Jane Coles; Sting

"For Her Love" is a song by English musician Sting. It first appeared on his fifteenth studio album, The Bridge, released on 19 November 2021. The song was written by Sting and Martin Kierszenbaum.

== Critical reception ==
John Shand at The Sydney Morning Herald wrote, "'For Her Love' exemplifies Sting’s prettiest songwriting". Lakshmi Govindrajan Javeri of Firstpost noted, "'For Her Love' is so reminiscent of Sting's 'Fragile’ and 'Shape of My Heart', with unmistakable hints of ‘Fields of Gold’. It's the Sting we collectively fell in love with, the affirmation of a life-long love affair with his works."

== Other versions ==
Sting performed a Spanish version of the song, titled “Por Su Amor", at the 2022 Lo Nuestro Awards, broadcast on Univision on 24 February 2022.

Sting and Italian singer Tiziano Ferro performed the song as a duet, "For Her Love - Sempre amata", in English and Italian, with Ferro writing the Italian lyrics. It first appeared on Ferro's eight studio album, Il mondo è nostro, released on 11 November 2022. Sting spoke of the collaboration with Ferro: "It's a pleasure to collaborate for 'For Her Love' with Tiziano, whose unique voice and delicate approach are perfect for the song". Ferro said, "I never would have dreamed of a collaboration like this. He was at his house in Tuscany when a mutual friend called me because he was listening to one of my songs. So we got in touch, and he asked me if I could say something about the struggle it takes to be together. He asked me to sing in Italian, in English, on his song. It was very generous."
