= Duets (Sting album) =

Compilation album by Sting
- Released: 19 March 2021
- Label: A&M

Sting chronology
My Songs (2019)	Duets (2021)	The Bridge (2021)

Singles from Duets
- 1. "My Funny Valentine" Released: 11 March 2021; 2. "Englishman/African in New York" Released: 19 March 2021

Duets is a compilation album by English musician Sting. It was released on 19 March 2021 through A&M Records.

== Background ==
Duets compiles 17 collaborations spanning from 1992's "It's Probably Me" with Eric Clapton from the Lethal Weapon 3 soundtrack to new songs, recorded remotely, with Melody Gardot, Zucchero and Gashi.

The standard "My Funny Valentine", recorded by Sting and Herbie Hancock as the theme song for the 2005 Japanese movie Ashura, was released as a single on 11 March 2021.

"Englishman/African In New York", a reworking of Sting's "Englishman in New York" recorded with African artist Shirazee was released as a non-album digital-only single on 19 March 2021. Shirazee had previously covered the song as "African in New York" with Sting's approval. Sting and Shirazee released a music video and performed the song on ABC's Good Morning America.

An interactive website was launched to complement the album, with details about each song, photos, as well as newly recorded video commentaries from Sting.

The album was originally scheduled to be released in November 2020, but was delayed due to manufacturing delays caused by the COVID-19 pandemic.

Several titles, such as "Simple" in performance with Ricky Martin, "Message in a Bottle" with All Saints, "Spirits" with Pato Banton from the film Ace Ventura: When Nature Calls and "Always on Your Side" in duet with Sheryl Crow, are not included in the album.

== Reception ==
Professional ratings
Review scores
Source	Rating
AllMusic	3/5 stars
Clash	6/10
The Independent	4/5 stars
Riff Magazine	8/10

Stephen Thomas Erlewine of AllMusic wrote "Collectively, these duets showcase Sting The Polymath, a cultured and worldly individual with an ability to synthesize his diverse interests into smooth, jazzy, mature pop." Emma Harrison of ClashMusic.com called the album "a solid return...spanning an array of genres including worldbeat, jazz, classical, blues, rock and new-age". Gary Graff of cleveland.com wrote that the songs "speak to Sting's well-documented appetite for creative diversity. And daring." Eoghan Lyng of CultureSonar wrote "Duets shows the singer/songwriter at his most inventive." Rachel Brodsky of The Independent calls the album "a welcome opportunity to revisit Sting's lengthy collaborative CV". Alexander Baechle of Riff Magazine wrote "Duets portrays Sting as a conduit for passionate performances. On many of the songs, his contribution is understated and uncertain, serving to push the featured artist forward. Yet the fact that each song is of such polished and refined quality speaks to Sting's subtle knack for engineering holistic, arty pop songs. Though he sacrifices some amount of the spotlight, the songs, the artists and listeners benefit."

== Track listing ==
All tracks are written by Sting, except where noted.

No.	Title	Writer(s)	Co-vocalist/Collaborator	Length
1.	"Little Something"	Sting; Noraa Abakar; Conor Blake; Antoine Chatenet; Melody Gardot; Dominic Miller; Hilda Stenmalm	Melody Gardot	2:42
2.	"It's Probably Me"	Sting; Eric Clapton; Michael Kamen	Eric Clapton	5:02
3.	"Stolen Car"	Sting; Mylène Farmer	Mylène Farmer	3:21
4.	"Desert Rose"	Sting; Cheb Mami	Cheb Mami	4:47
5.	"Rise & Fall"	Sting; Craig David; Dominic Miller	Craig David	4:46
6.	"Whenever I Say Your Name"		Mary J. Blige	5:24
7.	"Don't Make Me Wait"	Sting; Orville Burrell; Ashante Reid; Shaun Pizzonia; Kameron Quintin Jones; Kennard Garrett	Shaggy	3:35
8.	"Reste"	Sting; Maître Gims; Renaud Rebillaud	Gims	3:49
9.	"We'll Be Together"		Annie Lennox	3:49
10.	"L'Amour, c'est comme un jour"	Charles Aznavour; Yves Stéphane	Charles Aznavour	4:08
11.	"My Funny Valentine"	Richard Rodgers; Lorenz Hart	Herbie Hancock	4:53
12.	"Fragile"		Julio Iglesias	4:25
13.	"Mama"	Sting; Nathan Cunningham; Labinot Gashi; Marc Sibley	GASHI	3:18
14.	"September"	Sting; Zucchero Fornaciari; Rob Mathes	Zucchero	3:27
15.	"Practical Arrangement"	Sting; Rob Mathes	Jo Lawry	4:35
16.	"None of Us Are Free"	Barry Mann; Brenda Russell; Cynthia Weil	Sam Moore	4:03
17.	"In the Wee Small Hours of the Morning"	Bob Hilliard; David Mann	Chris Botti	4:28
Total length:				70:35

== Charts ==
=== Weekly charts ===
Weekly chart performance for Duets
Chart (2021)	Peak position
Austrian Albums (Ö3 Austria)	5
Belgian Albums (Ultratop Flanders)	17
Belgian Albums (Ultratop Wallonia)	7
Dutch Albums (Album Top 100)	9
French Albums (SNEP)	5
German Albums (Offizielle Top 100)	2
Hungarian Albums (MAHASZ)	20
Italian Albums (FIMI)	16
Portuguese Albums (AFP)	2
Scottish Albums (OCC)	4
Spanish Albums (PROMUSICAE)	29
Swiss Albums (Schweizer Hitparade)	7
UK Albums (OCC)	17

=== Year-end charts ===
Year-end chart performance for Duets
Chart (2021)	Position
Belgian Albums (Ultratop Wallonia)	147
French Albums (SNEP)	133
