= We'll Be Together (Sting song) =

- UK 12" single releases

Single by Sting

from the album ...Nothing Like the Sun
- B-side: "Conversation with a Dog"
- Released: October 1987
- Recorded: Summer 1987
- Genre: Dance-rock; funk rock
- Length: 4:52
- Label: A&M
- Songwriter: Sting
- Producers: Bryan Loren; Sting

Sting singles chronology
"We Work the Black Seam" (1986)	"We'll Be Together" (1987)	"Be Still My Beating Heart" (1988)

Music video
- "We'll Be Together" on YouTube

"We'll Be Together" is a song written and recorded by the English singer-songwriter Sting. It was released in 1987 as the lead single from his second solo studio album, ...Nothing Like the Sun.

== Background ==
Sting wrote the song for a beer commercial for Kirin Brewery Company. He said that they asked him for the word "together" to be included in the song. He wrote the song in a few minutes and said both the company and the record label liked the song, despite the short amount of time it took to come up with it. The original recording included Eric Clapton on guitar, while other takes feature Bryan Loren instead. The version with Clapton would surface later on Sting's 1994 greatest hits album Fields of Gold: The Best of Sting 1984–1994.

Lyrics from Sting's 1985 song "If You Love Somebody Set Them Free" are featured near the end of the song.

== Release ==
"We'll Be Together" was released as the first single from ...Nothing Like the Sun, backed with "Conversation with a Dog". The single achieved chart success in the United States, where it debuted Billboard Hot 100 at No. 59 during the week ending 10 October 1987, during which half of contemporary hit radio stations reporting to Billboard had added the song to their playlists. The song ultimately peaked at No. 7 on the Hot 100 later that year. It was less successful in Sting's home country, where it peaked at No. 41 on the UK Singles Chart.

Cash Box called it "an upbeat, lightly funk-tinged number" with "strong vocal work" and an "unusual but hypnotic rhythm track".

In 2004 during the North American dates of Sting's Sacred Love Tour, he was joined by Annie Lennox. During the tour, this was the only song that the two performed together. They then re-recorded a version of the song which later appeared on the soundtrack for Bridget Jones: The Edge of Reason (2004). The song was also included on Sting's compilation album Duets (2021).

== Music video ==
The video was shot in black-and-white and was directed by Mary Lambert, based on the film Orpheus (1950), and includes an appearance by Sting's wife Trudie Styler. Sting wears a homemade jumper (sweater) in the video based on the Belgian cartoon The Adventures of Tintin.

The video opens with a pan shot that centers on Sting (as the poet Marias) in the jumper. The music starts to play as he looks in a mirror, holds up his hands. He starts when he touches the mirror, turns. Outside the French Café des Poètes, men are casting dice in the street. A mural painter begins work, and the men start to dance. The poet climbs over the back of a booth and sits on the back of the seat. He puts on glasses, starts to sing and to write in a journal. Female dancers join the men. Outside the cafe, a beautiful woman (Styler as Casares) arrives in a car. She gets out, followed by a man (Sting as Cègeste) who appears to be very drunk.

The poet looks at the woman face-to-face, has an encounter with the man following her. He passes on, sits with another group of people. Behind him, the drunken Cègeste picks up the poetry sheets and puts them in his pocket. He starts to dance with the men. He follows the woman, touches her intimately, and she hits him in the face. They exchange blows and spectators finally interfere. The cafe dissolves into a brawl. The police arrive and try to break up the fight. Some of the men get the drunken Cègeste into the car again and the woman follows him as the poet watches. He gets into the car, too, as the dancers continue behind him. He sings to the woman, tells her they'll be together tonight. The car leaves the cafe. Dancers in front of the cafe turn over their chairs and exit. The music video won the MTV Video Music Award for Best Cinematography at the 1988 MTV Video Music Awards.

== Track listing ==
- 12" Single (A&M – SP-12251)
1. "We'll Be Together (Extended Mix)" – 5:54
2. "We'll Be Together (Instrumental Version)" – 4:10
3. "We'll Be Together (Album Version)" – 4:50
4. "Conversation with a Dog" – 3:24
5. "We'll Be Together (Previous Version)" – 4:30
- 7" Single (A&M – AM 410)
1. "We'll Be Together" – 4:52
2. "Conversation with a Dog" – 3:24

== Personnel ==
- Sting – vocals, bass guitar, arrangements
- Eric Clapton – electric guitar
- Manu Katché – drums
- Kenny Kirkland – keyboards
- Mino Cinelu – percussion, vocoder
- Branford Marsalis – saxophone
- Andy Newmark – additional drums
- Renée Geyer – backing vocals
- Vesta Williams – backing vocals
- Dolette McDonald – backing vocals
- Janice Pendarvis – backing vocals

== Charts ==
=== Weekly charts ===
Chart (1987)	Peak position
Australia (Kent Music Report)	13
Canada Top Singles (RPM)	9
European Hot 100 Singles (Music & Media)	16
European Hit Radio (Music & Media)	8
France (SNEP)	46
Ireland (IRMA)	14
Israel (IBA)	4
Italy (Musica e dischi)	4
Netherlands (Dutch Top 40)	33
New Zealand (Recorded Music NZ)	22
UK Singles (Official Charts)	41
UK Airplay (Music & Media)	13
US Billboard Hot 100	7
US Mainstream Rock (Billboard)	20
US Hot R&B/Hip-Hop Songs (Billboard)	39

=== Year-end charts ===
Chart (1988)	Position
Canada Top Singles (RPM)	97
US Billboard Hot 100	84
