= They Dance Alone (Cueca Solo) =

Single by Sting

from the album ...Nothing Like the Sun
- B-side: "Ellas Danzan Solas"
- Released: 2 September 1988
- Recorded: 1987
- Genre: Rock; jazz; world
- Length: 7:16
- Label: A&M
- Songwriter: Gordon Sumner
- Producer: Gordon Sumner

Sting singles chronology
"Fragile" (1988)	"They Dance Alone (Cueca Solo)" (1988)	"All This Time" (1991)

Music video
- "Sting - They Dance Alone (Cueca Solo)" on YouTube

"They Dance Alone (Cueca Solo)" is a protest song composed by the English musician Sting and published first on his 1987 album ...Nothing Like the Sun; the song was the fifth and final single released from the album. The song is a metaphor referring to mourning Chilean women (arpilleristas) who dance the Cueca, the national dance of Chile, alone with photographs of their disappeared loved ones in their hands.

Sting was accompanied by Eric Clapton, Fareed Haque and Mark Knopfler on guitar, by Branford Marsalis on the saxophone, and with Rubén Blades providing additional Spanish vocals.

== Song information ==
Sting explained his song as a symbolic gesture of protest against the Chilean dictator Augusto Pinochet whose regime killed thousands of people between 1973 and 1990. This song was recorded in both English (with some spoken Spanish words by the Panamanian salsa singer, Rubén Blades) and Spanish (with additional lyrics by Roberto Livi). This latter version was titled "Ellas Danzan Solas" and was released on the 1988 EP Nada como el sol.

Cash Box said that the song is "one of Sting's most powerful tunes, a tribute to the Chilean women who stand in mourning and protest for their missing sons and husbands." In 1989, the song won an Ivor Novello Award for Best Song Musically and Lyrically.

== Live versions ==
There are several live versions of this song, most notable from the Nelson Mandela 70th Birthday Tribute (1988), from an Amnesty International concert. Sting later performed the song with an extended introduction in Spanish during the Human Rights Now! concerts that took place from 2 September – 15 October 1988. On 13 October 1990, Sting played the song at Estadio Nacional in Santiago de Chile (with various artists including Peter Gabriel, Jackson Browne and Sinéad O'Connor).

== Cover versions ==
Mark Hall from the album Acoustic Moods of Sting, the London Symphony Orchestra (1994) from the album Performs the Music of Sting, Lynn McDonald (2007) from the album It's High Time, Holly Near & Mercedes Sosa (English/Spanish Version) (1990) from the album Singer in the Storm, Mariano Yanani (2005) from the album Babies go Sting, Joan Baez (Spanish Version) (1989) from the album Diamonds & Rust in the Bullring, and Birgitte Grimstad (Danish version) (1996) from the album Ord over grind, 51 Beste 1966–1994.

== Charts ==
=== Weekly charts ===
Weekly chart performance for "They Dance Alone"
Chart (1988–1989)	Peak position
Belgium (Ultratop 50 Flanders)	35
Germany (GfK)	66
Italy (Musica e dischi)	24
Netherlands (Dutch Top 40)	29
Netherlands (Single Top 100)	27
UK Singles (OCC)	94

Weekly chart performance for "Ellas Danzan Solas"
Chart (1988)	Peak position
Italy Airplay (Music & Media)	9

== See also ==
- "Mothers of the Disappeared" – a song by U2 that treats the same subject
