= Be Still My Beating Heart =

Single by Sting

from the album ...Nothing Like the Sun
- B-side: "Ghost in the Strand"
- Released: January 1988
- Genre: Soft rock; jazz
- Length: 3:59 (single); 5:32 (album)
- Label: A&M
- Songwriter: Sting

Sting singles chronology
"We'll Be Together" (1987)	"Be Still My Beating Heart" (1988)	"Englishman in New York" (1988)

Music video
- "Sting - Be Still My Beating Heart" on YouTube

"Be Still My Beating Heart" is a song by the English musician Sting, from his second studio album, ...Nothing Like the Sun (1987); released as the second US single from the album. In 1989 the song was nominated for Song of the Year and Best Male Pop Vocal Performance at the 31st Annual Grammy Awards.

Former Police bandmate Andy Summers played guitar on the track. The song appeared in the 2000 film Dolphins; Sting also wrote the score for the film. The track has since appeared on The Best of Sting: Fields of Gold 1984–1994 compilation album among others.

== Single release ==
The song was released as a single in Japan, South Africa, Australia, Canada & United States. For the week ending 16 January 1988, it was the fourth most-added song to radio playlists reporting to Billboard, having received 70 adds that week. It reached No. 15 on the US Billboard Hot 100, No. 37 Hot Adult Contemporary Tracks and No. 2 on the Hot Mainstream Rock Tracks charts, respectively. There are two single edit-length versions of the track (3:59) and (4:40).

== Music video ==
The music video for the song was directed by Candace Reckinger and her husband Michael Patterson, and includes model and actress, Mitzi Martin. The video later appeared on The Best of Sting: Fields of Gold 1984-1994 compilation VHS home video.

== Charts ==
Chart (1988)	Peak position
Australia (Kent Music Report)	94
Canada Top Singles (RPM)	22
Israel (IBA)	11
US Billboard Hot 100	15
US Adult Contemporary (Billboard)	37
US Mainstream Rock (Billboard)	2
