= Nothing Like the Sun (album) =

Studio album by Sting
- Released: 16 October 1987
- Recorded: March–August 1987
- Studio: AIR Studios (Montserrat)
- Genres: Pop; soft rock; jazz; reggae; world; acoustic rock
- Length: 54:45
- Label: A&M
- Producers: Sting; Neil Dorfsman; Bryan Loren

Sting chronology
Bring On the Night (1986)	Nothing Like the Sun (1987)	Nada como el sol (1988)

Singles from Nothing Like the Sun
- 1. "We'll Be Together" Released: 30 October 1987; 2. "Be Still My Beating Heart" Released: January 1988 (US); 3. "Englishman in New York" Released: 5 February 1988; 4. "Fragile" Released: 1 April 1988; 5. "They Dance Alone" Released: 2 September 1988

Nothing Like the Sun (stylised as ...Nothing Like the Sun) is the second solo studio album by the English musician Sting. The album was originally released on 16 October 1987 on A&M (worldwide) as a double LP and single CD. The album explores the genres of pop rock, soft rock, jazz, reggae, world, acoustic rock, dance-rock, and funk rock. The songs were recorded in March–August 1987 at AIR Studios, in Montserrat, assisted by record producers Bryan Loren and Neil Dorfsman. It features high-profile guest guitarists, including former Police member Andy Summers, Eric Clapton, Mark Knopfler, and Hiram Bullock, and is generally regarded as the culmination of the smoother, more adult-oriented sound of Sting's early work.

On release, the album was received favourably and in 1989 was ranked No. 90 on Rolling Stone magazine's list of the "100 Best Albums of the Eighties". "We'll Be Together", "Be Still My Beating Heart", "Englishman in New York", "Fragile", and "They Dance Alone" were all released as singles.

It won Best British Album at the 1988 Brit Awards. In 1989, the album received three Grammy nominations including Album of the Year while the album's second single ("Be Still My Beating Heart") was nominated for Song of the Year and Best Male Pop Vocal Performance.

== Background and recording ==
The album was influenced by two events in Sting's life: first, the death of his mother in June 1987 during the recording of the album, which contributed to the sombre tone of several songs; and second, his participation in the Conspiracy of Hope Tour on behalf of Amnesty International, which brought Sting to parts of Latin America that had been ravaged by civil wars, and introduced him to victims of government oppression. "They Dance Alone (Cueca Solo)" was inspired by his witnessing of public demonstrations of grief by the wives and daughters of men missing in Chile, tortured and murdered by the military dictatorship of the time, who danced the Cueca (the traditional dance of Chile) by themselves, with photos of their loved ones pinned to their clothes. "Be Still My Beating Heart" and "The Lazarus Heart" approach the subjects of life, love and death. Elsewhere on the album, "Englishman in New York", in honour of Quentin Crisp, continues the jazz-influenced music more commonly found on Sting's previous album, as does "Sister Moon".

For this album, the New England Digital Synclavier system was Sting's primary tool for writing, composing and arranging. He spent three months in New York gathering material for the next album, organising the ideas he had accumulated over the past year into finished songs on the Synclavier before entering the studio. The songs were more arranged than before, with the musicians simply layering their parts on top of Sting's Synclavier. Manu Katché, who played drums on the album, said that the band spent five days rehearsing the material in New York City before moving to AIR Studios in Montserrat. These sessions lasted ten days, with around 15 songs recorded during this period time; each song required roughly seven and eight takes to complete. Sting recorded the album with two 32-track digital tape recorders, allowing them to create multiple slave reels with different elements for a song. However, he found it difficult having too many options to choose from, and not hearing all the recorded parts until the mixing stage.

== Album title ==
The title comes from Shakespeare's Sonnet No. 130 ("My mistress' eyes are nothing like the sun"), which Sting used in the song "Sister Moon". He added that his inspiration for this was a close encounter with a drunk, in which Sting quoted the sonnet in response to the drunk's importunate query, "How beautiful is the moon?"

== Release ==
The album's first single and biggest hit, "We'll Be Together" sported a prominent dance beat and funk overtones; it reached No. 7 on the Billboard Hot 100 charts in late 1987 and even crossed over to the R&B charts.

The album also inspired a Spanish/Portuguese counterpart, the 1988 mini-album Nada Como el Sol. It featured four of the songs from the album sung in either Spanish or Portuguese, and in the case of "Fragile", both languages. The Brazilian CD and Vinyl edition of Nothing Like the Sun also contained "Fragile" in Portuguese ("Frágil") as the tenth track (between "Rock Steady" and "Sister Moon").

Three years after its release on both the album and in single form, "Englishman in New York" was remixed in mid-1990 by Dutch producer Ben Liebrand. Providing a stronger dance beat, as well as an extended introduction, the song was a hit in clubs and reached number 15 in the UK singles chart. The maxi-single also included a dance remix of "If You Love Somebody (Set Them Free)" as a B-side.

Nothing Like the Sun was one of the first fully digital audio recordings (DDD) to achieve multi-platinum status.

In celebration of its 35th anniversary, an expanded edition of the album was released on October 13, 2022. This digital-only release features the original 12 songs on the album, plus 14 bonus tracks that consist of B-sides, remixes, alternate versions, and instrumentals.

== Critical reception ==
Professional ratings
Review scores
Source	Rating
AllMusic	4.5/5 stars
Chicago Tribune	2.5/4 stars
Los Angeles Times	4/4 stars
Orlando Sentinel	4/5 stars
Q	4/5 stars
Rolling Stone	4.5/5 stars
The Rolling Stone Album Guide	4/5 stars
The Sacramento Bee	3.5/4 stars
Smash Hits	6 1/2/10
The Village Voice	B

Nothing Like the Sun was praised by many critics. Billboard called Nothing Like the Sun "an exceptionally rich two-record set that shows Mr. Sumner expanding musically, emotionally, and politically." Cashbox felt that the album was "expansive, weighty, [and] ambitious throughout".

In a review for Rolling Stone, Anthony DeCurtis wrote: "...Nothing Like the Sun represents impressive growth for Sting. His voice is rich, grainy and more mature; his ideas are gaining in complexity; and musically he is stretching without straining. His mistress's eyes may be nothing like the sun, but on this fine new album Sting's intrepid talent shines on brightly." In 1989, the album was ranked number 90 on Rolling Stone's list of the "100 Best Albums of the Eighties".

In a retrospective review, AllMusic editor Stephen Thomas Erlewine described ...Nothing Like the Sun as "one of the most doggedly serious pop albums ever recorded" and noted the presence of only one uptempo song ("We'll Be Together"), with the remaining tracks being "too measured, calm, and deliberately subtle to be immediate". He found that it succeeds as "a mood piece – playing equally well as background music or as intensive, serious listening", and that while slightly overlong, "it's one of his better albums."

There were harsher assessments elsewhere. Robert Christgau of The Village Voice observed a "more relaxed" Sting on the album but deemed it "pretentious" on the whole, while Greg Kot of the Chicago Tribune felt that Sting's "nuanced singing and literate lyrics" are "weighed down by ponderous music." Trouser Press critic Ira Robbins disparaged the album as "self-important" and "a tedious, bankrupt and vacuous cavern of a record."

== Commercial performance ==
In the United States, the album debuted at number 54 on the US Billboard 200 chart on the week of 31 October 1987 and eventually peaked at number nine in its third week of release. The album spent a total of 52 weeks on the chart. On 24 October 1991, the album was certified double platinum by the Recording Industry Association of America (RIAA) for sales of over two million copies in the United States.

In the UK, the album debuted and peaked at number one on the UK Albums Chart. In the second week the album dropped to number three. It spent a total of 42 weeks on the chart. The album was certified platinum by the British Phonographic Industry (BPI) for sales of over 300,000 copies in the United Kingdom.

== Track listing ==
All tracks are written by Sting, except where noted.

Side one
No.	Title	Length
1.	"The Lazarus Heart"	4:34
2.	"Be Still My Beating Heart"	5:32
3.	"Englishman in New York"	4:25

Side two
No.	Title	Length
4.	"History Will Teach Us Nothing"	4:58
5.	"They Dance Alone (Cueca Solo)"	7:16
6.	"Fragile"	3:54

Side three
No.	Title	Length
7.	"We'll Be Together"	4:52
8.	"Straight to My Heart"	3:55
9.	"Rock Steady"	4:27

Side four
No.	Title	Writer(s)	Length
10.	"Sister Moon"		3:46
11.	"Little Wing"	Jimi Hendrix	5:04
12.	"The Secret Marriage"	Hanns Eisler; Sting	2:03
Total length:			54:45

=== B-sides ===
1. "Ghost in the Strand" ("Englishman in New York" 7"/ Maxi Single)
2. "Ellas Danzan Solas" (Spanish version of "They Dance Alone", "They Dance Alone" Maxi Single)
3. "If You There" ("They Dance Alone" 7")
4. "Conversation with a Dog" ("We'll Be Together" 7"/ Maxi Single)
5. "Someone to Watch over Me" (George Gershwin's cover, "Englishman in New York" 3-inch CD single)
6. "Up from the Skies" (Jimi Hendrix cover with Gil Evans and His Orchestra, "Englishman in New York" 3-inch CD single)

== Singles ==
- 1987 – "We'll Be Together" No. 7 US
- 1988 – "Be Still My Beating Heart" No. 15 US
- 1988 – "Englishman in New York" No. 84 US, No. 51 UK
- 1988 – "Fragile" No. 70 UK
- 1988 – "They Dance Alone" No. 94 UK
- 1990 – "Englishman in New York" (Remix) No. 15 UK

== Personnel ==
Adapted from the album liner notes.

=== Musicians ===
- Sting – lead vocals, arrangements, bass (1–9, 12), Spanish guitar (4), acoustic guitar (6), double bass (10)
- Kenny Kirkland – keyboards
- Branford Marsalis – saxophones
- Gil Evans – keyboards (11)
- Gil Evans and his orchestra – orchestra (11)
- Ken Helman – piano (12)
- Andy Summers – guitars (1, 2)
- Eric Clapton – guitar (5, 7)
- Fareed Haque – guitar (5)
- Mark Knopfler – guitar (5)
- Hiram Bullock – guitars (11)
- Mark Egan – bass (11)
- Manu Katché – drums (1–10)
- Kenwood Dennard – drums (11)
- Andy Newmark – additional drums
- Mino Cinélu – percussion, vocoder
- Renée Geyer – backing vocals
- Dolette McDonald – backing vocals
- Janice Pendarvis – backing vocals
- Pamela Quinlan – backing vocals
- Rubén Blades – Spanish vocals (5)
- Annie Lennox – backing vocals (7)
- Vesta Williams – backing vocals (7)

=== Technical ===
- Produced by Sting, Neil Dorfsman (1–6, 8–12), and Bryan Loren (7)
- Production assistants – Ken Blair and Dave O'Donnell (1–6, 8–12)
- Mixed by Hugh Padgham (1–6, 8–12), Neil Dorfsman (1–6, 8–12), and Paul McKenna (7)
- Mix assistants – Mark McKenna (1–6, 8–12), Bob Vogt (1–6, 8–12), and John Hegedes (7)
- Mastered by Bob Ludwig at Masterdisk (New York, NY)
- Photography – Brian Aris
- Art direction and design – Richard Frankel

== Charts ==
=== Weekly charts ===
Chart (1987–88)	Position
Australian Kent Music Report	3
Austrian Albums Chart	3
Canadian Albums Chart	3
Dutch Albums Chart	3
French Albums Chart	3
German Albums Chart	4
Italian Albums Chart	1
Japanese Albums Chart	1
New Zealand Albums Chart	13
Norwegian VG-lista Albums Chart	2
Spanish Albums Chart	2
Swedish Albums Chart	7
Swiss Albums Chart	3
UK Albums Chart	1
US Billboard 200	9
US Top R&B Albums (Billboard)	52

=== Year-end charts ===
Chart (1987)	Position
Australian Albums Chart	82
Canadian Albums Chart	26
Dutch Albums Chart	65
French Albums Chart	4
Japanese Albums Chart	56
UK Albums Chart	68

Chart (1988)	Position
Australian Albums Chart	46
Austrian Albums Chart	8
Dutch Albums Chart	6
Japanese Albums Chart	87
Swiss Albums Chart	3
UK Albums Chart	84
U.S. Billboard 200	24

=== Decade-end charts ===
Chart (1980s)	Position
Austrian Albums Chart	19

== Certifications and sales ==
Region	Certification	Certified units/sales
Australia	—	100,000
Belgium (BRMA)	Platinum	50,000^{*}
Brazil	—	125,000
Canada (Music Canada)	Platinum	100,000^{^}
France (SNEP)	2× Platinum	600,000^{*}
Germany (BVMI)	Platinum	500,000^{^}
Hong Kong (IFPI Hong Kong)	Gold	10,000^{*}
Italy	—	460,000
Japan (Oricon Charts)	—	221,000
Netherlands (NVPI)	Platinum	100,000^{^}
New Zealand (RMNZ)	Gold	7,500^{^}
Portugal (AFP)	Gold	20,000^{^}
Spain (Promusicae)	Platinum	100,000^{^}
Switzerland (IFPI Switzerland)	2× Platinum	100,000^{^}
United Kingdom (BPI)	Platinum	300,000^{^}
United States (RIAA)	2× Platinum	2,000,000^{^}
Yugoslavia	—	50,000
^{*} Sales figures based on certification alone.^{^} Shipments figures based on certification alone.
