= I've Seen That Face Before (Libertango) =

Single by Grace Jones

from the album Nightclubbing
- Language: English; French
- B-side: "Warm Leatherette"; "Demolition Man"; "Pull Up to the Bumper"
- Released: May 1981
- Studio: Compass Point Studios (Nassau, Bahamas)
- Genre: Tango; reggae; chanson
- Length: 4:29
- Label: Island
- Songwriters: Astor Piazzolla; Grace Jones; Barry Reynolds; Dennis Wilkey; Nathalie Delon
- Producers: Chris Blackwell; Alex Sadkin

Grace Jones singles chronology
"Demolition Man" (1981)	"I've Seen That Face Before (Libertango)" (1981)	"Pull Up to the Bumper" (1981)

Music video
- "I've Seen That Face Before (Libertango)" on YouTube

"I've Seen That Face Before (Libertango)" is a single by Jamaican singer Grace Jones, released in 1981. The song is a reworking of Astor Piazzolla's "Libertango".

== Background ==
The song juxtaposes "Libertango", an Argentine tango classic written by composer and bandoneonist Astor Piazzolla (first recorded by Piazzolla himself in 1974), against a tango, reggae and chanson sound and new lyrics penned by Jones herself and Barry Reynolds. Lyrically, it describes the darker side of Parisian nightlife. The song includes spoken parts in French, written by actress Nathalie Delon: "Tu cherches quoi? À rencontrer la mort? Tu te prends pour qui? Toi aussi tu détestes la vie…" which translates "What are you looking for? To meet death? Who do you think you are? You too, hate life." Jones also recorded a Spanish language version of the track entitled "Esta cara me es conocida", and an English version with the French passage recited in Portuguese.

Recorded in Nassau, Bahamas, with Sly and Robbie, Wally Badarou, Barry Reynolds, Mikey Chung, and Uziah "Sticky" Thompson, aka the Compass Point Allstars under Chris Blackwell's and Alex Sadkin's direction, with Jack Emblow adding the accordion. "I've Seen That Face Before" was released as the second single from Jones' album Nightclubbing, after "Demolition Man" made no chart impact. It met with a commercial success, reaching Top 20 in no fewer than five European countries, including number 1 in Belgium, and now counts as one of Jones' signature tunes. A longer version of the song was released on a 12" single.

"I've Seen That Face Before (Libertango)" has been described as "one of the highlights of Nightclubbing" and "one of the highlights of Jones' musical career".

== Music video ==
The song is famous for its music video, directed by Jean-Paul Goude. It begins with a picture of Grace wearing a tall black hat and her face concealed under a three-piece paper mask. These are then removed and her trademark flattop haircut is displayed. Jones then starts to perform the song, singing straight into the camera, and plays accordion. The camera then zooms out, revealing that the video set is located on the roof of a tower block. The single cover recreates an image from the clip. The video is the closing track on Jones' classic A One Man Show music documentary.

== Track listing ==
- 7" single

A. "I've Seen That Face Before (Libertango)" – 4:29
B. "Warm Leatherette" – 4:25

- 7" single

A. "I've Seen That Face Before" – 4:30
B. "Demolition Man" – 4:32

- 7" ES single

A. "Esta cara me es conocida (I've Seen That Face Before (Libertango))" – 4:32
B. "El demoledor (Demolition Man)" – 3:31

- 12" single

A. "I've Seen That Face Before (Libertango)" – 5:32
B. "Warm Leatherette" – 4:25

- 12" single

A. "I've Seen That Face Before (Libertango)" – 5:36
B. "Pull Up to the Bumper" – 5:01

- 7" Brazilian single

A. "I've Seen That Face Before (Libertango)" (Sung in Portuguese) - 4:30
B. "Warm Leatherette" - 4:25

== Chart performance ==
=== Weekly charts ===
Chart (1981)	Peak position
Belgium (Ultratop 50 Flanders)	1
Italy (FIMI)	31
Netherlands (Dutch Top 40)	2
Netherlands (Single Top 100)	4
France (IFOP)	35
Spain (AFYVE)	14
Sweden (Sverigetopplistan)	20
Switzerland (Schweizer Hitparade)	9
West Germany (GfK)	16
Chart (2016)	Peak position
France (SNEP)	109

=== Year-end charts ===
Chart (1981)	Position
Belgium (Ultratop 50 Flanders)	5
Italy (FIMI)	88
Netherlands (Dutch Top 40)	13
Netherlands (Single Top 100)	43
West Germany (Official German Charts)	67
