= The Bridge (Sting album) =

Studio album by Sting
- Released: 19 November 2021
- Recorded: 2020
- Studios: Lake House (Wiltshire); Il Palagio (Italy); Hôtel Germain (Senlis); Cherrytree Recording Studio; Sear Sound (New York City); Sanctuary Studios (Bahamas)
- Genre: Pop-rock
- Length: 36:25
- Labels: A&M; Cherrytree; Interscope
- Producers: Martin Kierszenbaum; Maya Jane Coles; Sting

Sting chronology
Duets (2021)	The Bridge (2021)

Singles from The Bridge
- 1. "If It's Love" Released: 1 September 2021; 2. "Rushing Water" Released: 30 September 2021

The Bridge is the fifteenth studio album by British singer-songwriter Sting, released on 19 November 2021 through A&M Records, Cherrytree Music Company and Interscope Records. It is his first rock-oriented album since 2016's 57th & 9th. The album marks the return of Branford Marsalis on saxophone and clarinet, as well as Manu Katché on drums.

== Background ==
Sting wrote the album "in a year of global pandemic, personal loss, separation, disruption, lockdown and extraordinary social and political turmoil".

== Singles ==
"If It's Love", the first single from the album, was released on 1 September 2021.

== Reception ==
Professional ratings
Review scores
Source	Rating
AllMusic	3.5/5 stars
The Scotsman	3/5 stars
The Sydney Morning Herald	3.5/5 stars

Lakshmi Govindrajan Javeri of Firstpost wrote "Sting's new release The Bridge has a strong pop-rock vibe that defined his Police and early solo years, but some of its best songs have Celtic and jazz influences." Mark Kennedy of the Associated Press wrote "The Bridge is a moody and varied collection in an unmoored time, with nods to Scripture, ancient allegories, and malevolent characters. It's a strong album from a singer-songwriter who sees warning signs ahead." Fiona Shepherd of The Scotsman wrote "Sting is also in sprightly mood on The Bridge, whistling along on the blithe single 'If It's Love', as decent a pop tune as he has produced in some time. This lockdown production nods to his diverse musical tastes, from mellow roots track 'The Book of Numbers' with its plangent bass twang to the slick soaring saxophone (from Branford Marsalis no less) on 'Harmony Road' to the fiddle flourish of 'Captain Bateman', which is revisited as a jazzy scat bonus track called 'Captain Bateman's Basement'." John Shand at The Sydney Morning Herald says that the album has Sting "bundling up his established interests in pop, R&B, folk and a dash of jazz – which could also be described as treading musical water", and describes Sting as "an artist who still sounds in his prime." Michael Gallucci of Ultimate Classic Rock describes the album as "Sting's least fussy and most satisfying album in years."

== Track listing ==
All tracks are written by Sting, except where noted. All tracks are produced by Sting and Martin Kierszenbaum, except where noted.

No.	Title	Writer(s)	Producer(s)	Length
1.	"Rushing Water"	Sting; Kierszenbaum; Gavin Brown		3:17
2.	"If It's Love"			3:12
3.	"The Book of Numbers"	Sting; Dominic Miller		3:18
4.	"Loving You"	Sting; Maya Jane Coles	Sting; Kierszenbaum; Coles	4:24
5.	"Harmony Road"	Sting; Miller		3:18
6.	"For Her Love"	Sting; Kierszenbaum		3:45
7.	"The Hills on the Border"			4:16
8.	"Captain Bateman"			4:14
9.	"The Bells of St. Thomas"	Sting; Miller		4:08
10.	"The Bridge"			2:33
Total length:				36:25

Deluxe edition bonus tracks
No.	Title	Writer(s)	Length
11.	"Waters of Tyne"	Traditional	2:10
12.	"Captain Bateman's Basement"		3:41
13.	"(Sittin' On) The Dock of the Bay"	Steve Cropper; Otis Redding	2:54
Total length:			45:10

Japanese release bonus track
No.	Title	Writer(s)	Length
14.	"I Guess the Lord Must Be in New York City"	Harry Nilsson	2:18
Total length:			47:28

== Personnel ==
- Sting: Vocals, Bass Guitar (1, 5, 6, 12 and 13), Fretless Bass Guitar (3, 7 and 8), Double Bass (9), Guitar (2, 3, 5, 8, 10, 11 and 13), Keyboards (3,7 and 8)
- Dominic Miller: Guitars (1–10)
- Martin Kierszenbaum: Drum programming (1–3, 5–7 and 13), Keyboards (2, 5, 6, 8 and 13), Synthesizer (1, 2, 8, 12 and 13), Organ (1, 3 and 13), Piano (13), Guitar (2), Percussion (13)
- Frédéric Renaudin: Synthesizer (1, 7 and 9)
- Josh Freese: Drums (1, 2 and 5)
- Manu Katché: Drums (8,9 and 12)
- Donal Hodgson: Drum programming (3, 7 and 8), percussion programming (2)
- Maya Jane Coles: Drum programming (4), Synthesizer (4)
- Gavin Brown: Guitar (1)
- Branford Marsalis: Saxophone, clarinet (5)
- Peter Tickell: fiddle (7 and 8)
- Julian Sutton: Melodeon (7)
- Gene Noble: Backing vocals (1–4 and 6)
- Melissa Musique: Backing vocals (2–4 and 6)
- Jo Lawry: Backing vocals (8)
- Laila Biali: Backing vocals (8)
- Shaggy: Handclaps (2)

== Charts ==
=== Weekly charts ===
Weekly chart performance for The Bridge
Chart (2021)	Peak position
Australian Albums (ARIA)	64
Austrian Albums (Ö3 Austria)	7
Belgian Albums (Ultratop Flanders)	23
Belgian Albums (Ultratop Wallonia)	5
Canadian Albums (Billboard)	90
Czech Albums (ČNS IFPI)	7
Dutch Albums (Album Top 100)	27
French Albums (SNEP)	14
German Albums (Offizielle Top 100)	5
Hungarian Albums (MAHASZ)	29
Italian Albums (FIMI)	26
Japanese Hot Albums (Billboard Japan)	21
Polish Albums (ZPAV)	8
Portuguese Albums (AFP)	46
Scottish Albums (Official Charts)	17
Slovak Albums (ČNS IFPI)	75
Spanish Albums (Promusicae)	50
Swiss Albums (Schweizer Hitparade)	5
UK Albums (Official Charts)	27
US Billboard 200	101
US Top Rock Albums (Billboard)	15

=== Year-end charts ===
Year-end chart performance for The Bridge
Chart (2021)	Position
Belgian Albums (Ultratop Wallonia)	103
French Albums (SNEP)	163
German Albums (Offizielle Top 100)	91
Swiss Albums (Schweizer Hitparade)	80

== Certifications ==
Region	Certification	Certified units/sales
Poland (ZPAV)	Gold	10,000^{‡}
France (SNEP)	Gold	50,000^{‡}
^{‡} Sales+streaming figures based on certification alone.
