= Demolition Man (song) =

1981 song by the Police

Single by Grace Jones

from the album Nightclubbing
- B-side: "Warm Leatherette"; "Bullshit"
- Released: 6 February 1981
- Studio: Compass Point (Nassau, Bahamas)
- Genre: Reggae rock; dance
- Length: 4:04
- Label: Island
- Songwriter: Sting
- Producers: Chris Blackwell; Alex Sadkin

Grace Jones singles chronology
"Breakdown" (1980)	"Demolition Man" (1981)	"I've Seen That Face Before (Libertango)" (1981)

Music video
- "Demolition Man" on YouTube

"Demolition Man" is a song written by Sting and performed by Grace Jones as the A-side of a 1981 single. Sting's band, the Police, later released their rendition of the song on their album Ghost in the Machine.

== Background ==
The song was written by Sting in the summer of 1980 while he was living in Peter O’Toole’s home in Connemara, Ireland. It was written for potential use on the Police's Zenyatta Mondatta, but they never got around to recording it. A demo was sent to Grace Jones when she requested a song from Sting.

The lyric "I'm a three-line whip" is an allusion to the instructions issued to members of British parliament to cast their votes according to the party line. Sting explained in an interview, "Whatever party's in power in Parliament, if it's a really important vote, you get a one-line whip. If it's incredibly important, you have a two-line whip, and something monumentally important is a three-line whip." According to Sting, he never guessed that his A-level in British Constitution would "bear fruit in a rock and roll lyric."

== Grace Jones version ==
"Demolition Man" was released as the lead single from Grace Jones's 1981 album Nightclubbing. She performed the song on her A One Man Show tour, featuring marching "Joneses" (stand-ins wearing Grace Jones masks), and it was included in the documentary film of the tour. A still picture from the video was later used for the cover of her 1982 singles "Nipple to the Bottle" and "The Apple Stretching".

=== Track listing ===
- 7" single

A. "Demolition Man" – 3:31
B. "Warm Leatherette" – 4:25

- 12" single

A. "Demolition Man" – 4:56
B. "Bullshit" – 5:18

== The Police version ==
"Demolition Man"

Song by the Police

from the album Ghost in the Machine
- Released: 2 October 1981
- Recorded: June 1981
- Genre: New wave; hard rock; post-punk
- Length: 5:57
- Label: A&M
- Songwriter: Sting
- Producer: The Police

Music video
- "Demolition Man" on YouTube

Soon after Jones released her version as a single, the Police recorded their own version for their 1981 album, Ghost in the Machine. Guitarist Andy Summers recalls:

"He [Sting] did have Demolition Man previously, mind you – he'd already given that to Grace Jones to put on her Nightclubbing album. In fact, that was the song we recorded first. You have to break the ice with something, and that was an easy one to do. It’s a very simple song. We all listened to the Grace Jones version and thought 'Shit, we can do it much better than that.' It was a one-take job. To me, our version is more ballsy, which is what you’d expect from Grace Jones."

The Police recorded the song in a jazzy hard rock style, featuring a guitar solo by Andy Summers. Sting's roadie Danny Quatrochi played the bass.

=== Personnel ===
- Sting – vocals, saxophone
- Andy Summers – guitars
- Stewart Copeland – drums
- Danny Quatrochi – bass (uncredited)

== Use in popular culture and other media ==
- In Michael Chabon's first novel Mysteries of Pittsburgh, the character named 'Cleveland' quotes from "Demolition Man" in Chapter Six, after shaking a door off its hinges.
- "Demolition Man" was performed by Sting many times during his solo career and released in 1993 on an EP of the same name in support of the film Demolition Man; this version of the song plays during the end credits.
- In "True Crime", the 53rd episode of Beavis and Butt-head, aired in 1993, the pair were watching Jones' video for "Demolition Man" within A One Man Show.
- A live version of "Demolition Man", performed by Sting and recorded at Irving Plaza in 2005, was featured in the game Guitar Hero World Tour along with an in-game representation of Sting himself, which becomes an unlockable character upon completing the song in the bass career. This recording was later remixed and released on Sting's compilation The Best of 25 Years.
- An excerpt of Jones' performance of the song from A One Man Show was displayed as a part of the Postmodernism: Style and Subversion 1970–1990 temporary exhibition at London's Victoria and Albert Museum in 2011 and 2012.
- "Demolition Man" was included on the 1984 album Budapest Live by Manfred Mann's Earth Band, and previously on their 1983 studio album Somewhere in Afrika.
