= Demolition Man (EP) =

Soundtrack album extended play by Sting
- Released: 21 September 1993
- Recorded: 1993; 25 July 1993 (live tracks)
- Venues: Villa Manin, Codroipo, Italy
- Genre: Rock
- Length: 35:13
- Label: A&M
- Producer: Sting

Sting chronology
Ten Summoner's Tales (1993)	Demolition Man (1993)	Mercury Falling (1996)

Demolition Man is an EP released by A&M on 21 September 1993 in the United States and on 8 November 1993 in the United Kingdom, in support of the Sylvester Stallone/Wesley Snipes film Demolition Man. It features Sting's re-recording of The Police track "Demolition Man", as well as several live recordings. The live recordings were recorded at Villa Manin, Codroipo, Italy on 25 July 1993. The US and International/European EP release features the title track and five live recordings and sales for this release were listed on the US Albums Chart, as the UK release was a standard single which featured an exclusive single version of the title track as well as the album version and two live recordings. The UK release charted therefore on the UK Singles Chart, where it peaked at number 21.

== Reception ==
Professional ratings
Review scores
Source	Rating
AllMusic	1/5 stars
Entertainment Weekly	C
The Rolling Stone Album Guide	2/5 stars

AllMusic panned the American version in their brief review, claiming that the recordings are "unremarkable" and that the retail price (over $10, nearly as much as most full-length albums retailed for at the time) was inexcusable.

== Track listing ==
All tracks are written by Sting, except where noted.

US EP (31454 0162 2) / International (Europe) EP (540 162-2)
No.	Title	Writer(s)	Length
1.	"Demolition Man"		5:27
2.	"King of Pain" (live)		7:21
3.	"Shape of My Heart" (live)	Sting; Dominic Miller	4:32
4.	"Love Is Stronger Than Justice (The Munificent Seven)" (live)		7:29
5.	"It's Probably Me" (live)	Sting; Eric Clapton; Michael Kamen	6:18
6.	"A Day in the Life" (live)	Lennon–McCartney	4:06
Total length:			35:13

UK CDS (580 453-2)
No.	Title	Writer(s)	Length
1.	"Demolition Man" (Soulpower mix edit)		3:40
2.	"Demolition Man" (film version)		5:27
3.	"It's Probably Me" (live)	Sting; Clapton; Kamen	6:18
4.	"A Day in the Life" (live)	Lennon–McCartney	4:06
Total length:			21:05

== Personnel ==
- Sting – vocals, guitar
- Dominic Miller – guitars
- Mark Egan – bass guitar
- David Sancious – keyboards
- Vinnie Colaiuta – drums
- Arik Marshall – guitars
- Paul Bushnell – bass guitar
- Ann Bennett Nesby – backing vocals and solo ad-libs
- Jamecia Bennett – backing vocals
- Core Cotton – backing vocals
- Shirley Marie Graham – backing vocals

== Charts ==
Chart performance for Demolition Man
Chart (1993)	Peak position
Australia (ARIA)	71
