= Janice Pendarvis =

American singer, songwriter, and voiceover artist

Janice Gadsden Pendarvis is an American singer, songwriter, and voiceover artist. She has worked with artists such as Sting, David Bowie, Steely Dan, Peter Tosh, the O'Jays, Philip Glass, Jimmy Cliff, Laurie Anderson, the Naked Brothers Band, and the Rolling Stones.

== Biography ==
Janice was born and raised in Queens, New York. She attended and graduated from Hunter College High School and from Queens College, NYC. She started her career as a songwriter.

She sang on a Roberta Flack background session for the Feel Like Makin' Love album, which included fellow background singers Deniece Williams and Patti Austin. David Spinozza, a good friend of Pendarvis, convinced her to become serious about learning the craft of singing.

Janice provided background vocals for Sting on his first solo album, The Dream of the Blue Turtles, which was nominated for a Grammy for Album of the Year in 1986. Pendarvis took part in Sting's first solo tour, sharing choruses with Dolette McDonald on the live album and movie Bring on the night. They both returned for Sting's next studio album ...Nothing Like the Sun. Finally, she was featured on Sting's ...All This Time live album recorded at the British singer's "Villa Il Palagio" in Italy, on September 11, 2001. Her most well-known commercial success has been being featured in the documentary Bring on the Night, profiling the music of Sting at the beginning of his solo career. She was featured in the music video "If You Love Somebody (Set Them Free)". She also sang lead on the song "Lightning" from the Philip Glass album Songs from Liquid Days.

== Personal life ==
Pendarvis was previously married to Leon Pendarvis, a longtime Saturday Night Live Band member and composer-arranger.

Pendarvis has served on the National Boards of the Screen Actors Guild (SAG) and the American Federation of Television and Radio Artists (AFTRA). She has also served on the NY Chapter Board of Governors of The Recording Academy (NARAS).

== In popular culture ==
Pendarvis appears in the documentary film 20 Feet from Stardom (2013), directed by Morgan Neville.

== Discography ==
- 1974 : Feel Like Makin' Love by Roberta Flack
- 1977 : Jungle Girl/It Ain't Easy - Single by Tamara Dobson
- 1978 : Evolution (The Most Recent) by Taj Mahal
- 1979 : City Connection by Terumasa Hino
- 1981 : Holding Out My Love To You by Max Romeo
- 1985 : The Dream of the Blue Turtles by Sting
- 1986 : Dirty Work by the Rolling Stones - Alongside with Dolette McDonald on backing vocals
- 1986 : Bring On the Night by Sting
- 1986 : Magnetic Love by Steps Ahead
- 1986 : Songs From Liquid Days by Philip Glass
- 1986 : Home of the Brave (soundtrack) by Laurie Anderson
- 1987 : ...Nothing Like the Sun by Sting
- 1990 : Terumasa Hino by Terumasa Hino
- 2001 : ...All This Time by Sting
- 2008 : I Don't Want to Go to School by the Naked Brothers Band - Soundtrack of the movie of the same name.
- 2013 : The Next Day by David Bowie

== Filmography ==
- 1978 : The Wiz by Sidney Lumet - Singer
- 1985 - 1986 : American Masters by Susan Lacy - TV Series - Herself
- 1986 : Bring On the Night by Michael Apted - Herself
- 1986 : Home of the Brave - Herself
- 1990 : Green Card by Peter Weir - Singer
- 1997 - 2014 : Behind the Music by Gay Rosenthal - TV Series - Herself
- 2001 : Sting ...All This Time by Jim Gable - Herself
- 2004 - 2017 : The Apprentice by Mark Burnett - TV Series - Herself
- 2013 : 20 Feet from Stardom by Morgan Neville - Herself
