= Fragile (Sting song) =

Single by Sting

from the album ...Nothing Like the Sun
- Released: 1 April 1988 (UK)
- Recorded: 1987
- Genre: Acoustic rock, jazz
- Length: 3:54
- Label: A&M
- Songwriter: Sting
- Producer: Sting

Sting singles chronology
"Englishman in New York" (1988)	"Fragile" (1988)	"They Dance Alone (Cueca Solo)" (1988)

"Fragile" is a song written and performed by the English musician and singer-songwriter Sting from his second studio album, ...Nothing Like the Sun (1987). Released as a single the following year by A&M, it peaked at number 70 on the UK Singles Chart. Sung additionally in both Spanish and Portuguese under the titles "Fragilidad" and "Frágil", it appeared twice more on his 1988 EP variant of the album, Nada como el sol. The Spanish version features as a B-side to "I'm So Happy I Can't Stop Crying".

== Background ==
The song is a tribute to Ben Linder, an American civil engineer who was killed by the Contras in 1987 while working on a hydroelectric project in Nicaragua. In a 1994 interview with Miami Herald, Sting said that the song's meaning "changes yearly. When I sing it now I think of Bosnia and Yugoslavia."

The guitars on "Fragile" were played by Sting. Dominic Miller, who has served as Sting's touring guitarist, remarked in a 1999 interview with Virtual Guitar Magazine that Sting was "quite proud of the fact that he played guitar on the recording". He said that Sting would bar him from playing guitar for live performances of "Fragile" in response to Miller incorrectly telling fans that he played guitar on the song. Instead, Miller was assigned to bass guitar for live renditions of "Fragile".

I meet a lot of fans who think that I played [the guitars on "Fragile"]. I tell Sting that I say I did. It really pisses him off! So, his comeback is not letting me play it live. It's been like that for years now and I'm delegated [sic] to bass.

— Dominic Miller

The song appeared in the 1995 Oscar-nominated documentary The Living Sea. It was the first song performed in Sting's All This Time concert, recorded on the evening of the September 11 attacks in 2001. The performance occurred in Tuscany outside one of Sting's mansions and was webcast online. Sting had announced that he would initially only play "Fragile" that evening and allow the audience to determine whether they wanted him to continue performing, which they did. This rendition was lifted as the first single from the All This Time album, a decision that was not originally planned. According to Max Hole of Universal Music Group, "Fragile" was "not meant to be the single. Sting chose that song because of its lyrical relevance. After the webcast, it was a no-brainer – it had to be the single."

Sting also performed the song with cellist Yo Yo Ma during the opening ceremonies of the 2002 Winter Olympics in Salt Lake City, Utah.

== Critical reception ==
In their review of the single, Music & Media advised radio programmers to "handle with care", saying that this song requires a delicate setting and should never be used as a plain filler." They also found "Fragile" to be a "beautiful lament" with "contemplative" vocals from Sting.

== Live performances ==
In March 2026, Sting performed the song as part of a live concert titled "Sounds like Art" he gave at the Rijksmuseum in Amsterdam.

== Track listings ==
- UK 7-inch Single
1. "Fragile"
2. "Frágil" (Portuguese)
- Bolivian 7-inch Single
1. "Fragil"
2. "Si Estamos Juntos"
- UK CD Single / UK 12-inch Single
1. "Fragile" – 3:45
2. "Frágil" – 3:50
3. "Frágilidad" – 3:52
4. "Mariposa Libre" – 4:54
- Spanish 7-inch Single
1. "Fragile" – 3:54
2. "Frágil" (Portuguese) – 3:50
- European 7-inch Single
1. "Fragile" – 3:54
2. "Frágil" (Portuguese) – 3:50
- West German 12-inch Maxi Single / European CD Maxi Single
1. "Fragile" – 3:54
2. "Up From The Skies" – 10:06
3. "Someone to Watch Over Me" – 4:32
- Uruguayan 7-inch Single
1. "Fragile" (In Spanish) – 3:55
2. "Conversation With A Dog" – 3:34
- Canadian 7-inch Single / US 7-inch Single / Japanese 3-inch CD Single / Japanese Promo 3-inch CD Single
1. "Fragile" – 3:54
2. "Fragilidad" (Spanish) – 3:52
- Portuguese 7-inch Single
1. "Fragile" – 3:54
2. "Frágil" (Portuguese) – 3:52
- US Promo 7-inch Single
1. "Fragile" – 3:54
2. "Fragile" – 3:54
- French 7-inch Single / French CD Single
1. "Fragil" (Portugues) – 3:50
2. "Mariposa Libre" – 4:54
- Spanish 7-inch Single
1. "Fragilidad" – 3:52
2. "Fragil" (Portugues) – 3:50
- Mexican 7-inch Promo Single
1. "Fragilidad" – 3:52
2. "Fragilidad" – 3:52
- French 12-inch Promo Single
1. "Fragil" (Portugues) – 3:50
2. "Fragil" (Portugues) – 3:50

== Charts ==
=== Weekly charts ===
Chart (1988)	Peak position
Belgium (Ultratop 50 Flanders)	11
European Airplay (Music & Media)	32
Netherlands (Dutch Top 40)	10
Netherlands (Single Top 100)	12
UK Singles (Official Charts)	70

Chart (2001)	Peak position
Italy (FIMI)	25
Switzerland (Schweizer Hitparade)	64
West Germany (GfK)	92

Chart (2016)	Peak position
France (SNEP)	94

=== Year-end charts ===
Chart (1988)	Position
Netherlands (Dutch Top 40)	82
Netherlands (Single Top 100)	92

== Cover versions ==
Isaac Hayes recorded a funk cover that was released on his 1995 Branded album. The song stayed in the top 100 for two weeks.

Pianist Kenny Barron recorded a cover of "Fragile" on his album The Moment. Barron re-recorded the song with Regina Carter for their 2001 album Freefall.

A version of the song with Julio Iglesias was included on Sting's Duets compilation album (2021).

Sting recorded the song as a duet with Barbra Streisand for her 2025 album The Secret of Life.

In the 2025 Netflix Series "Adolescence", a cover version of the song performed by a student choir from Minsthorpe Community College in West Yorkshire, UK, is used as a soundtrack. It has received praise from Sting who called it "beautiful".
