= Englishman in New York =

1988 single by Sting

Single by Sting

from the album Nothing Like the Sun
- B-side: "Ghost in the Strand"
- Released: 5 February 1988
- Recorded: 1987
- Genre: Jazz; reggae; rock; pop
- Length: 4:25
- Label: A&M
- Songwriter: Sting
- Producers: Sting; Neil Dorfsman

Sting singles chronology
"Be Still My Beating Heart" (1988)	"Englishman in New York" (1988)	"Fragile" (1988)

Music video
- "Sting - Englishman In New York" on YouTube

"Englishman in New York" is a song by the English singer-songwriter Sting, from his second studio album Nothing Like the Sun, released in October 1987. Branford Marsalis played soprano saxophone on the track, while the drums were played by Manu Katché and the percussion by Mino Cinélu.

The single was released in February 1988 by A&M Records as the third single from the album and reached No. 51 on the UK Singles Chart. In the US, "Englishman in New York" peaked at No. 84 on the Billboard Hot 100 chart in April 1988 and reached No. 32 on the Billboard Mainstream Rock chart that same month. However, the single was more successful in continental Europe, becoming a hit in several countries, reaching the top 40 in France, the Netherlands, Spain, and Belgium. "Englishman in New York" was also a top 20 hit in Ireland. In South Africa, it peaked at No. 9.

In 1990, just prior to the release of his third studio album The Soul Cages, Sting's record label licensed Dutch DJ and producer Ben Liebrand to remix "Englishman in New York" and subsequently released it as a single. The remix played around with the introduction and some of the instrumentation, but the essence of the song remained the same. The new version was commercially successful, reaching number 15 in the UK charts in mid-1990.

In 2010, Sting re-recorded the song in an orchestral version for his album Symphonicities.

"Englishman/African in New York", a reworking of the song recorded with African artist Shirazee, was released as a non-album digital-only single on 19 March 2021. Shirazee had previously covered the song as "African in New York" with Sting's approval. Sting and Shirazee released a music video and performed the song on ABC's Good Morning America.

== Content ==
Sting wrote the song about the famous eccentric and gay icon Quentin Crisp, who is the "Englishman" of the title. The song was composed not long after Crisp had moved from London to an apartment in the Bowery in Manhattan. Sting had met her, and Crisp remarked jokingly to the musician that she looked forward to receiving her naturalisation papers so that she could "commit a crime and not be deported." When Sting asked her what kind of crime, Crisp answered, "Something glamorous, non-violent, with a dash of style. Crime is so rarely glamorous these days." Sting included this story in the liner notes of his album ...Nothing Like The Sun.

== Musical content ==
The song is in the key of B minor, and uses mainly the same chord progression throughout, Em - A - Bm (except in the bridge). These chords' functions are iv - VII - i. The soprano saxophone that plays over the song uses mainly notes of the B minor scale.

In the bridge the chords change to D - A - Bm - F#, G - A - F# - Bm. This corresponds with III - VII - i - V, VI - VII - V - i.

== Critical reception ==
Music & Media labeled "Englishman in New York" as their single of the week, calling it a "commercial track" with a "sunny by even so melancholic chorus and a playful jazzy interlude" that would make it "perfect for European radio". Billboard characterised it as a "languid and fluid item from the recent Grammy winners "...Nothing Like The Sun"."

== Music video ==
The music video for "Englishman in New York" was shot in black-and-white and was directed by American director David Fincher, and featured scenes of Sting and his band in New York (primarily Branford Marsalis playing sax), as well as the elusive Quentin Crisp. At the end of the video, after the song fades, an elderly male voice says: "If I have an ambition other than a desire to be a chronic invalid, it would be to meet everybody in the world before I die... and I'm not doing badly."

== Track listing ==
- 12" Single (AMY 431)
1. "Englishman in New York" – 4:25
2. "Ghost in the Strand" – 2:33
3. "Bring on the Night"/"When the World Is Running Down" (Live) – 11:42
- 7" Single (AM 1200)
1. "Englishman in New York" – 4:25
2. "If You There" – 4:08
- CD Maxi Single (75021 2370 2)
1. "Englishman in New York" – 4:03
2. "Someone to Watch Over Me" – 4:35
3. "Up from the Skies" – 10:07

== Charts ==
=== Weekly charts ===
Chart (1988)	Peak position
Belgium (Ultratop 50 Flanders)	16
Canada Top Singles (RPM)	60
European Airplay (Music & Media)	4
France (SNEP)	30
Italy Airplay (Music & Media)	7
Netherlands (Dutch Top 40)	9
Netherlands (Single Top 100)	13
Spain (AFYVE)	21
UK Singles (Official Charts)	51
US Billboard Hot 100	84
US Mainstream Rock (Billboard)	32

Chart (2019)	Peak position
Poland Airplay (ZPAV)	81

==== 1990 remix ====
Chart (1990)	Peak position
Europe (Eurochart Hot 100)	43
Finland (Suomen virallinen lista)	20
Germany (GfK)	20
Ireland (IRMA)	12
Israel (IBA)	1
Luxembourg (Radio Luxembourg)	11
Netherlands (Single Top 100)	60
UK Singles (Official Charts)	15
UK Airplay (Music & Media)	8

== Certifications ==
Region	Certification	Certified units/sales
Denmark (IFPI Danmark)	Platinum	90,000^{‡}
Germany (BVMI)	Gold	250,000^{‡}
Italy (FIMI) sales since 2009	Gold	25,000^{‡}
Japan (RIAJ) digital	Gold	100,000^{*}
New Zealand (RMNZ)	Gold	15,000^{‡}
Spain (Promusicae)	Gold	30,000^{‡}
United Kingdom (BPI) sales since 2004	Gold	400,000^{‡}
^{*} Sales figures based on certification alone.^{‡} Sales+streaming figures based on certification alone.

== Cris Cab version ==
- In 2015, American singer Cris Cab covered the song featuring Tefa & Moox, and Willy William. This version charted on the French SNEP Top Singles chart, reaching number 16, and also on the Belgian Wallonia Ultratop singles chart at No. 34.

== Other versions ==
- In 1993, the song was partially remade by Shinehead, re-titled as "Jamaican in New York" (1993). It reached No. 30 on the UK Singles Chart in April 1993.
- In 1993, German musician Otto Waalkes recorded a German-language version entitled "Friesenjung". In 2023, a techno rework of this version (by German rapper Ski Aggu, Dutch rapper Joost Klein and Waalkes) reached No. 1 on the German and Austrian singles charts.
- In 2007, Japanese singer-songwriter Masao Taneura released a single titled "Kansaijin in Tokyo", singing about the cultural differences he experiences as a person from the Kansai region living in Tokyo.
- In 2007, Ivorian reggae singer Tiken Jah Fakoly released his version called "Africain à Paris", the 4th track on his album "L’Africain". The lyrics focus on demystifying the colonially-shaped stereotype of French cultural success, luxury, and prestige indoctrinated into Africans by showing his harsh exile and the racialized lifestyle imposed on him, a common theme in Fakoly's discography. The song became an iconic piece within the French-African reggae scene.
- In July 2019, Sting and Shaggy held a joint Tiny Desk Concert for NPR opening with this track; Sting sang his original first verse and Shaggy a modified following verse titled "Jamaican in New York".
