= A&M Records =

American record label

A&M Records, Inc.
- Parent company: Universal Music Group (UMG); Previously; PolyGram (1989–1998)
- Founded: September 1962; 64 years ago
- Founder: Herb Alpert; Jerry Moss
- Defunct: January 1999; 27 years ago
- Distributors: Interscope Geffen A&M Records (United States); Polydor Records (United Kingdom and France)
- Genre: Various
- Country of origin: United States
- Location: Santa Monica, California; Hollywood, California (1966–1999)
- Official website: interscope.com

A&M Records, Inc. was an American record label established in 1962 by Herb Alpert and Jerry Moss. It rapidly gained recognition in the music industry, becoming a major independent label until its acquisition by PolyGram in 1989. After this acquisition, A&M continued to operate as a self-managed frontline label within the PolyGram framework.

In 1998, PolyGram was acquired by Seagram and subsequently integrated into Universal Music Group. In January 1999, A&M's operations were merged with those of Interscope Records and Geffen Records, leading to the creation of Interscope Geffen A&M Records (now part of the Interscope Capitol Labels Group). Subsequently, A&M became a brand under the larger label group, no longer operating autonomously. In 2007, the A&M brand and trademark were combined with Octone Records to create A&M Octone Records, which remained operational until 2014, when it was absorbed into Interscope.

Currently, select releases from A&M's catalog are managed by Verve Records, Universal Music Enterprises, and Interscope, while much of Alpert's back catalog has been issued under his label, Herb Alpert Presents. Despite A&M's hibernation in 2014, its name and logo have remained visible on recent works by artist Sting, whose latest release, 2021's The Bridge, featured the A&M branding.

== History ==
=== Founding ===
A&M Records was formed in late 1962 by Herb Alpert and Jerry Moss. Their first choice for a name was Carnival Records, under which they released two singles before discovering that another label had already taken the Carnival name. The company was subsequently renamed A&M, after Alpert's and Moss's initials. From 1966 to 1999, the company's headquarters and recording studios were on the grounds of the historic Charlie Chaplin Studios at 1416 North La Brea Avenue, near Sunset Boulevard in Hollywood.

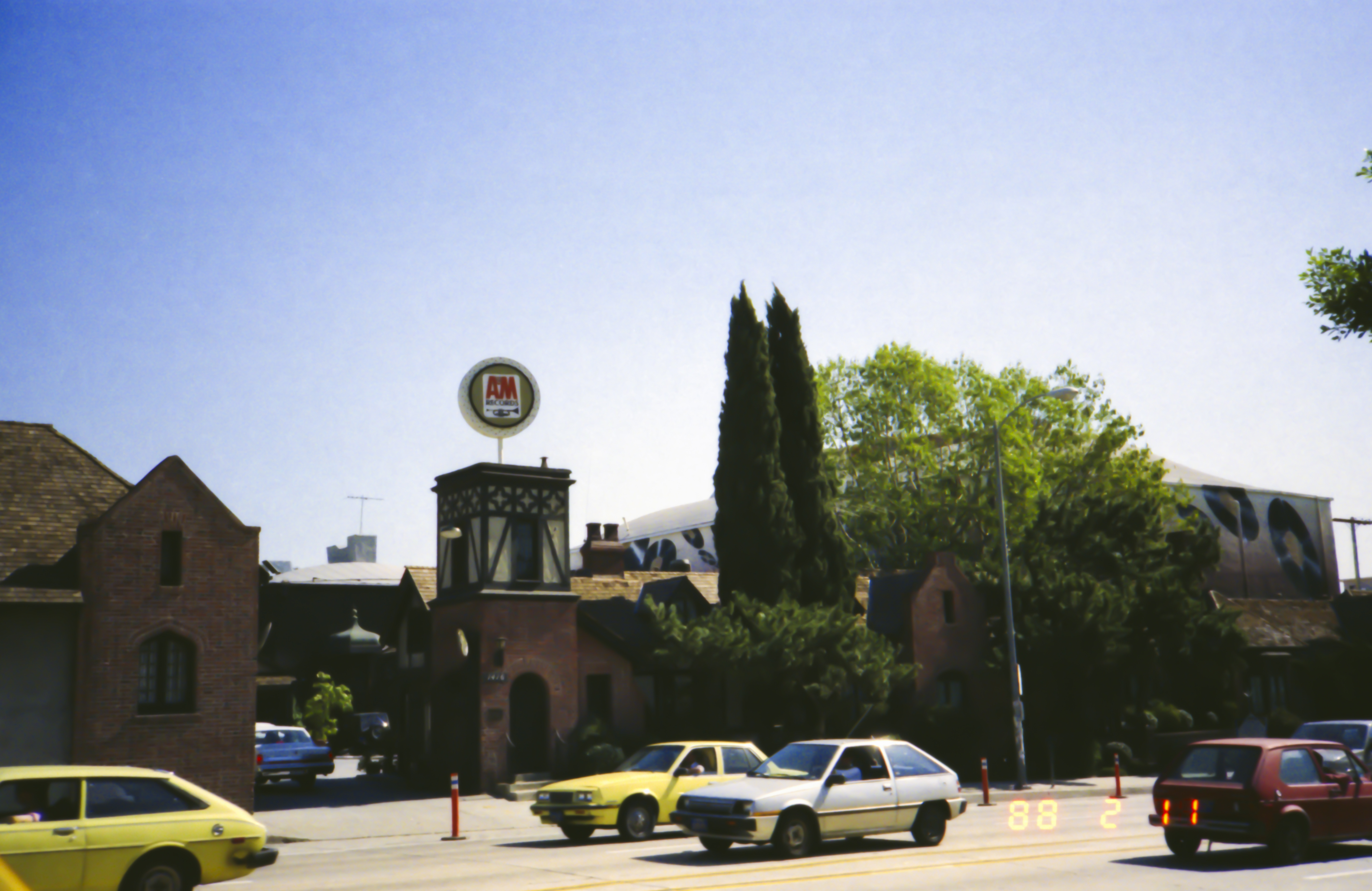
A&M Studios Main Gate 1988

Throughout the 1960s and 1970s, A&M had such acts as Herb Alpert & the Tijuana Brass, Baja Marimba Band, Burt Bacharach, Antônio Carlos Jobim, Sérgio Mendes & Brasil ’66, the Sandpipers, Boyce & Hart, We Five, the Carpenters, Chris Montez, Elkie Brooks, Lee Michaels, Captain and Tennille, the Flying Burrito Brothers, Quincy Jones, Lucille Starr, Stealers Wheel, Hoyt Axton, Gallagher and Lyle, Barry DeVorzon, Perry Botkin, Jr., Marc Benno, Liza Minnelli, Rita Coolidge, Gino Vannelli, Wes Montgomery, Jan Davis, Paul Desmond, Bobby Tench, Hummingbird, Toni Basil, and Paul Williams. Folk artists Joan Baez, Phil Ochs and Gene Clark also recorded for the label during the 1970s. Billy Preston joined the label in 1971, followed by Andre Popp and Herb Ohta in 1973.

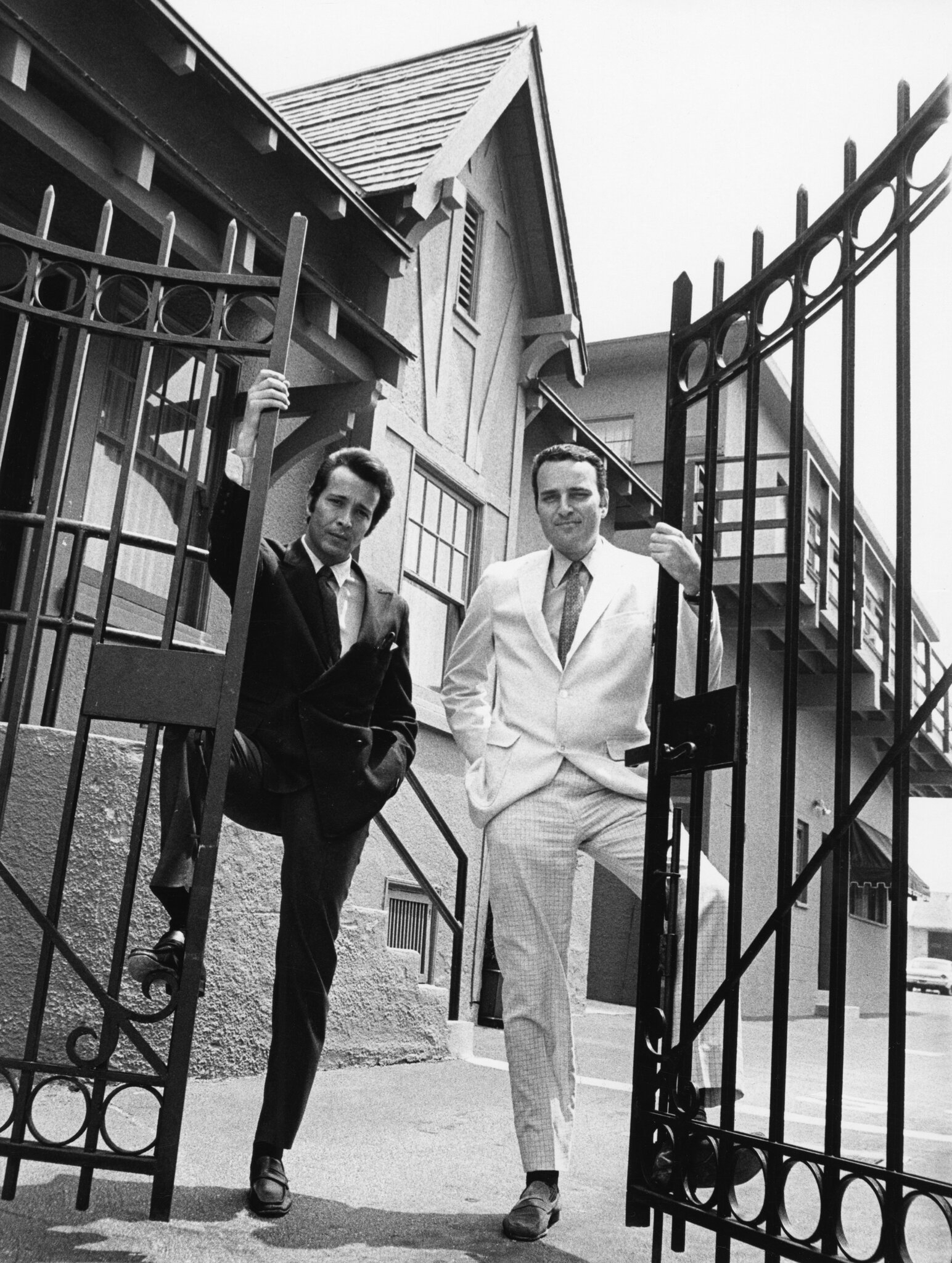
Herb Alpert and Jerry Moss at the gates of their studio at La Brea Avenue. 1967

In the late 1960s, through direct signing and licensing agreements, A&M added several British artists to its roster, including Cat Stevens, Joe Cocker, Procol Harum, Humble Pie, Fairport Convention, Free, the Move, Strawbs and Spooky Tooth. In the 1970s, under its manufacturing and distribution agreement with Ode Records, A&M released albums by Carole King and the comedy duo Cheech & Chong. Other notable acts of the time included Nazareth, Y&T, the Tubes, Styx, Supertramp, Joan Armatrading, Bell and James, Chris de Burgh (who went on to greater mainstream success in the 1980s), Rick Wakeman, the Ozark Mountain Daredevils, Chuck Mangione, Squeeze, and Peter Frampton. On March 10, 1977, A&M "signed" the Sex Pistols outside Buckingham Palace in a mock signing ceremony after the band had been dropped by EMI, although the real signing had actually occurred the prior day; however, A&M dropped the band within a week.

A&M sustained its success during the 1980s with a roster of noted acts that included Orchestral Manoeuvres in the Dark; Henry Badowski; Janet Jackson; the Police; Sting; the Brothers Johnson; Falco; Atlantic Starr; the Go-Go's; Bryan Adams; Suzanne Vega; Righeira; Brenda Russell; Jeffrey Osborne; Oingo Boingo; the Human League; Ozark Mountain Daredevils; Sharon, Lois & Bram; Annabel Lamb; Jim Diamond; Vital Signs; Joe Jackson; Charlie Peacock; Vesta Williams; and Scottish rock band Gun. They also, through a deal with Christian music label Myrrh, distributed back catalog recordings of Amy Grant as well as her new recordings, starting with 1985's Unguarded, to the mainstream marketplace, a vital component in her subsequent breakthrough as a mainstream artist.

Within a decade of its inception, A&M became the world's largest independent record company. A&M releases were initially issued in the United Kingdom by EMI's Stateside Records label, and then under its own name by Pye Records, who released the first Herb Alpert records on the Pye International label before issuing the records on the A&M label until 1967. From 1969, A&M set up its own UK base appointing John Deacon (not to be confused with Queen's bass guitarist of the same name) as general manager, a post he held until 1979. Several A&R men were recruited including Larry Yaskiel, Derek Green and Mike Noble and major UK acts such as the Police, Supertramp, Rick Wakeman, Squeeze, Gallagher & Lyle, Elkie Brooks, the Strawbs and Peter Frampton as well as many others were all signed to the UK label. A&M releases were also issued in Australia through Festival Records until 1989. A&M Records Ltd. was established in 1970, with distribution handled by other labels with a presence in Europe. A&M Records of Canada Ltd. was also formed in 1970, and A&M Records of Europe in 1977. In 1979, A&M entered a distribution agreement with RCA Records in the US, and with CBS Records in many other countries.

Over the years, A&M added specialty imprints: Almo International for middle of the road; Omen Records (1964–1966) for soul; Horizon Records for jazz (1974–1978); AyM Discos for Latin-American; Vendetta Records for dance music (1988–1990); and Tuff Break Records for hip-hop music (1993–1995).

=== Acquisition by PolyGram ===
In 1989, A&M was bought by PolyGram for $500 million; Bertelsmann Music Group (in the United States) and CBS Records International (rest of the world except Australia) ended their distribution agreement with A&M that same year. Alpert and Moss continued to manage the label until 1993. In 1998, Alpert and Moss sued PolyGram for breach of the integrity clause, eventually settling for an additional $200 million payment.

In 1991, A&M launched Perspective Records as a joint venture with producing team Jimmy Jam and Terry Lewis. Jam and Lewis stepped down as CEOs of the imprint in 1997, but they remained on as consultants. In 1999, the label was absorbed into A&M. In the mid-1990s, A&M began distributing its PolyGram sister label Polydor Records in the US.

During the 1990s, the company continued to release albums by Paw, Soundgarden, Extreme, Amy Grant, John Hiatt, Sting, Blues Traveler, Barry White, and Aaron Neville, as well as material from new artists Sheryl Crow, Monster Magnet, Therapy?, CeCe Peniston, Intelligent Hoodlum, Dred Scott, Ridel High and Gin Blossoms. The company released the soundtracks Robin Hood: Prince of Thieves, The Three Musketeers, Sabrina, The Living Sea, Demolition Man, and Lethal Weapon 3.

=== Universal Music Group merging and Interscope Geffen A&M ===
In 1998, PolyGram was bought by Seagram and merged into Universal Music Group, which was formed in 1996 as the successor to MCA Music Entertainment Group, of which MCA Records had been the flagship. A&M was subsequently merged into Universal Music Group's then newly formed Interscope Geffen A&M label group. Its Canadian division was absorbed into Universal Music Canada at that time, which included Jann Arden alongside other artists from Canada.

The A&M lot on La Brea Avenue was shut down in January 1999. During the farewell celebration, the company's staff placed a black band over the A&M sign above the main entrance, indicating the death of the company. The former A&M studios and executive offices became the home of the Jim Henson Company, which operates Henson Recording Studios. Most of the company's workforce, some of whom had been with the company for a decade or more, were let go while many of its artists were dropped. The label's more prominent acts such as Sting, Sheryl Crow, Bryan Adams and Chris Cornell, however, remained on its roster.

In response to the down-sourcing, Al Cafaro stated,

This isn't about Universal or Seagram. The record business is changing fundamentally. Don't think that there are calm seas on the other side of this threshold. If the quake that devoured A&M and Geffen is a 6.0 on the Richter scale, there is a 7.0 coming in this industry. It's a Wall Street world now. Get ready.

A&M catalog albums that did not fit the current pop music format (which also includes rock, rap and R&B) of their new parent division were transferred to other Universal divisions for management - for example, Verve Records now manages A&M's jazz catalog, not including Herb Alpert's recorded output which Alpert acquired in the settlement with Universal Music (however, Verve does manage the Horizon Records catalog).

Despite the shutdown, the A&M name continued to be used on albums from artists such as Snow Patrol, the Black Eyed Peas and Keyshia Cole—a result of Alpert and Moss's 1998 lawsuit—until February 2007, when Interscope Geffen A&M partnered with Octone Records to relaunch the A&M label fully. Now headed by James Diener and called A&M/Octone Records with worldwide distribution handled by parent Universal Music Group, the existing Octone roster was transferred to the A&M/Octone label and all newer artist signings were made under the A&M/Octone joint venture. Acts that were already signed to the label before the merger with Octone, however, would remain on the main A&M label.

After six successful years of operation, in September 2013, Octone initiated its buy/sell rights in the joint venture, resulting in Interscope Geffen A&M purchasing Octone Records' 50% interest in A&M/Octone, absorbing and restructuring the artist roster into Interscope operations in 2014 as announced.

Since the label's second dissolution, label artist Sting continued to license the A&M name and logo for his future album releases, starting with 2013's The Last Ship and continuing lately with 2021's The Bridge.

== Subsidiary and associated labels ==
- 1500 Records (1998–2001)
- A&M Films (1983–1997)
- A&M Video (1984–1996)
- Antra Records (1998)
- AM:PM (1990–1999, UK imprint for R&B, hip-hop and dance music)
- Breakout Records (1987–1990, UK imprint for R&B and hip-hop music)
- CTI Records (1967–1970)
- Cypress Records (1988–1990)
- Dark Horse Records (1974–1976)
- Delos International (1988–1990)
- Denon (1988–1992)
- Designer Software (1984–1989)
- DV8 Records (1995–1998)
- Flip Records (1996–1998)
- Gold Mountain Records (1983–1985)
- Heavyweight Records (1998)
- Horizon Records (1974–1978)
- Hollywood Records (1995–1999)
- Perspective Records (1991–1999)
- I.R.S. Records (1979–1985)
- Nimbus Records (1987–1990)
- Ode Records (1970–1975)
- Polydor Records (1995–1999)
- Rap-A-Lot Records (1988)
- Shelter Records (In Great Britain, early 1970s)
- Tabu Records (1991–1993)
- Tuff Break Records (1993–1995)
- TwinTone (1987–1989)
- T.W.Is.M (1996–1998)
- Vendetta Records (1988–1991)
- Windham Hill Records (and its subsidiary labels) (1982–1989)
- Word Records (and its subsidiary labels: Exit, Myrrh, Live Oak) (1985–1990)

== Theatrical film productions ==
- Birdy (1984, co-production with Tri-Star Pictures)
- Better Off Dead (1985, co-production with CBS Theatrical Films, distributed by Warner Bros. Pictures)
- The Breakfast Club (1985, co-production with Universal Pictures and Hughes Entertainment)
- Bring On the Night (1985)
- One Crazy Summer (1986, co-production with Warner Bros.)
- The Beast (1988)
- Blaze (1989)
- The Mighty Quinn (1989)
- Worth Winning (1989)
- Crooked Hearts (1991)
- A Midnight Clear (1992)
- A Home of Our Own (1993)
- House of Cards (1993)
- S.F.W. (1994)
- Mrs. Winterbourne (1996)

== See also ==
- Gil Friesen, former President of A&M Records
- Interscope Records
- A&M Octone Records
- A&M Records, Inc. v. Napster, Inc.
- List of record labels
- Chaplin Studios
- List of A&M Records artists
- Republic Records, a similar record label based in New York City
  - Universal Records
  - Universal Motown Records
