= 57th & 9th Tour =

2017 concert tour by Sting

- Tour by Sting
- Associated album: 57th & 9th
- Start date: February 1, 2017
- End date: October 18, 2017
- Legs: 7
- No. of shows: 115

Sting concert chronology
- Summer 2016 Tour (2016); 57th & 9th Tour (2017); My Songs Tour (2019–2024)

The 57th & 9th Tour was a world tour by English singer-songwriter Sting, in support of his twelfth solo studio album 57th & 9th. The tour began on February 1, 2017, at the Commodore Ballroom in Vancouver and continued until October of that year.

== DVD/Blu-ray release ==
The Paris tour date was filmed and released as a DVD and Blu-ray, Sting: Live at the Olympia Paris.

== Setlists ==
=== North America leg 1 ===
1. "Heading South on the Great North Road"
2. "Synchronicity II"
3. "Spirits in the Material World"
4. "Englishman in New York"
5. "I Can't Stop Thinking About You"
6. "She's Too Good for Me"
7. "One Fine Day"
8. "I Hung My Head"
9. "Fields of Gold"
10. "Down, Down, Down"
11. "Petrol Head"
12. "Shape of My Heart"
13. "Pretty Young Soldier"
14. "Message in a Bottle"
15. "Ashes to Ashes" (sung by Joe Sumner)
16. "50,000"
17. "Walking on the Moon"
18. "So Lonely"
19. "Desert Rose"
20. "Roxanne" / "Ain't No Sunshine"
21. "Next to You"
22. "Every Breath You Take"
23. "The Empty Chair"

Songs played occasionally:

- "I'm So Happy I Can't Stop Crying"
- "All This Time"
- "Fragile"

=== Europe leg 2 ===
1. "Heading South on the Great North Road"
2. "Synchronicity II"
3. "Spirits in the Material World"
4. "Englishman in New York"
5. "I Can't Stop Thinking About You"
6. "One Fine Day"
7. "She's Too Good for Me"
8. "I Hung My Head"
9. "Fields of Gold"
10. "Down, Down, Down"
11. "Petrol Head"
12. "Shape of My Heart"
13. "Pretty Young Soldier"
14. "Message in a Bottle"
15. "Ashes to Ashes" (sung by Joe Sumner)
16. "50,000 ('17)"
17. "Walking on the Moon"
18. "So Lonely"
19. "Desert Rose"
20. "Roxanne" / "Ain't No Sunshine"
21. "Next to You"
22. "Every Breath You Take"
23. "Fragile"

=== Latin America leg ===
1. "Synchronicity II"
2. "Spirits in the Material World"
3. "Englishman in New York"
4. "I Can't Stop Thinking About You"
5. "One Fine Day"
6. "She's Too Good for Me"
7. "I Hung My Head"
8. "Fields of Gold"
9. "Petrol Head"
10. "Down, Down, Down"
11. "Shape of My Heart"
12. "Message in a Bottle"
13. "Ashes to Ashes" (sung by Joe Sumner)
14. "50,000 ('17)"
15. "Walking on the Moon"
16. "So Lonely"
17. "Desert Rose"
18. "Roxanne" / "Ain't No Sunshine"
19. "Next to You"
20. "Every Breath You Take"
21. "Fragile"

Songs played occasionally:

- "Seven Days"
- "Pretty Young Soldier"
- "Every Little Thing She Does Is Magic"

=== Asia leg ===
1. "Synchronicity II"
2. "Spirits in the Material World"
3. "Englishman in New York"
4. "I Can't Stop Thinking About You"
5. "Every Little Thing She Does Is Magic"
6. "One Fine Day"
7. "She's Too Good for Me"
8. "Fields of Gold"
9. "Petrol Head"
10. "Down, Down, Down"
11. "Shape of My Heart"
12. "Message in a Bottle"
13. "Ashes to Ashes" (sung by Joe Sumner)
14. "50,000 ('17)"
15. "Walking on the Moon"
16. "So Lonely"
17. "Desert Rose"
18. "Roxanne" / "Ain't No Sunshine"
19. "Next to You"
20. "Every Breath You Take"
21. "Fragile"

Songs played occasionally:

- "Seven Days"
- "Mad About You"
- "Heading South on the Great North Road"

=== Europe leg 2 ===
1. "Synchronicity II"
2. "If I Ever Lose My Faith in You"
3. "Spirits in the Material World"
4. "Englishman in New York"
5. "Every Little Thing She Does Is Magic"
6. "She's Too Good for Me"
7. "Mad About You"
8. "Fields of Gold"
9. "Shape of My Heart"
10. "Petrol Head"
11. "One Fine Day"
12. "Message in a Bottle"
13. "Ashes to Ashes" (sung by Joe Sumner)
14. "50,000 ('17)"
15. "Walking on the Moon"
16. "So Lonely"
17. "Desert Rose"
18. "Roxanne" / "Ain't No Sunshine"
19. "Next to You"
20. "I Can't Stop Thinking About You"
21. "Every Breath You Take"
22. "Fragile"

Songs played occasionally:

- "Driven to Tears"
- "Down, Down, Down"
- "Heading South on the Great North Road"

=== North American leg 2 ===
1. "Heading South on the Great North Road"
2. "Synchronicity II"
3. "If I Ever Lose My Faith in You"
4. "Spirits in the Material World"
5. "Englishman in New York"
6. "Every Little Thing She Does Is Magic"
7. "She's Too Good for Me"
8. "Mad About You"
9. "Fields of Gold"
10. "Shape of My Heart"
11. "Petrol Head"
12. "One Fine Day"
13. "Message in a Bottle"
14. "Ashes to Ashes" (sung by Joe Sumner)
15. "50,000 ('17)"
16. "Walking on the Moon"
17. "So Lonely"
18. "Desert Rose"
19. "Roxanne" / "Ain't No Sunshine"
20. "Next to You"
21. "I Can't Stop Thinking About You"
22. "Every Breath You Take"
23. "Fragile"

Songs played occasionally:

- "Seven Days"

=== Europe leg 3 ===
1. "Heading South on the Great North Road"
2. "Synchronicity II"
3. "If I Ever Lose My Faith in You"
4. "Spirits in the Material World"
5. "Englishman in New York"
6. "Every Little Thing She Does Is Magic"
7. "Mad About You"
8. "Fields of Gold"
9. "Shape of My Heart"
10. "Petrol Head"
11. "She's Too Good for Me"
12. "Message in a Bottle"
13. "Ashes to Ashes" (sung by Joe Sumner)
14. "50,000 ('17)"
15. "Walking on the Moon"
16. "So Lonely"
17. "Desert Rose"
18. "Roxanne" / "Ain't No Sunshine"
19. "Next to You"
20. "I Can't Stop Thinking About You"
21. "Every Breath You Take"
22. "Fragile"

Songs played occasionally:

- "Seven Days"
- "One Fine Day"
- "De Do Do Do, De Da Da Da"

== Personnel ==
- Sting – vocals, bass, rhythm guitar
- Dominic Miller – lead and rhythm guitar, backing vocals
- Rufus Miller – lead and rhythm guitars, bass, backing vocals
- Josh Freese – drums, percussion
- Joe Sumner – rhythm guitar, bass, vocals, percussion
- Jerry Fuentes – backing vocals, percussion (North American, European leg 1, Latin American & Asian legs only)
- Diego Navaira – backing vocals (North American, European leg 1, Latin American & Asian legs only)
- Derek James – backing vocals, percussion on "She's Too Good for Me" & "Every Breath You Take" (North American, European leg 1, Latin American & Asian legs only)
- Emilio Navaira IV – backing vocals, percussion on "She's Too Good for Me", "Desert Rose" & "Every Breath You Take" (North American, European leg 1, Latin American & Asian legs only)
- Percy Cardona – Squeezebox, backing vocals, percussion
- Ben Thornewill – backing vocals, percussion (European leg 2 only)

== Tour dates ==
List of concerts, showing date, city, country, venue, opening acts, tickets sold, number of available tickets and amount of gross revenue
| Date | City | Country | Venue | Attendance | Revenue |
North America
| February 1, 2017 | Vancouver | Canada | Commodore Ballroom | 1,157 / 1,157 | $129,340 |
| February 2, 2017 | Portland | United States | Theater of the Clouds | 5,122 / 5,122 | $449,996 |
| February 8, 2017 | Los Angeles | United States | Hollywood Palladium | 6,324 / 6,324 | $620,797 |
| February 9, 2017 | Los Angeles | United States | Hollywood Palladium | 6,324 / 6,324 | $620,797 |
| February 11, 2017 | Rancho Mirage | United States | Agua Caliente Casino | — | — |
| February 14, 2017 | Denver | United States | Fillmore Auditorium | 3,689 / 3,689 | $293,400 |
| February 16, 2017 | Kansas City | United States | Uptown Theater | — | — |
| February 17, 2017 | St. Louis | United States | The Pageant | — | — |
| February 19, 2017 | Austin | United States | Moody Theater | 2,588 / 2,588 | $285,687 |
| February 20, 2017 | Dallas | United States | Verizon Theatre at Grand Prairie | 5,284 / 5,284 | $447,045 |
| February 22, 2017 | New Orleans | United States | Lakefront Arena | 3,129 / 3,129 | $269,536 |
| February 23, 2017 | Houston | United States | Smart Financial Centre | 6,156 / 6,156 | $541,594 |
| February 25, 2017 | Miami | United States | Fillmore Miami Beach | 2,705 / 2,705 | $259,363 |
| February 27, 2017 | Atlanta | United States | Tabernacle | 2,364 / 2,364 | $227,995 |
| February 28, 2017 | Nashville | United States | Nashville Municipal Auditorium | 4,400 / 4,400 | $317,980 |
| March 2, 2017 | Minneapolis | United States | Myth | 2,419 / 2,419 | $194,832 |
| March 3, 2017 | Chicago | United States | Aragon Ballroom | 4,791 / 4,791 | $385,646 |
| March 5, 2017 | Toronto | Canada | Rebel | 2,518 / 2,518 | $180,963 |
| March 6, 2017 | Montreal | Canada | Métropolis | 2,206 / 2,206 | $198,280 |
| March 8, 2017 | Boston | United States | House of Blues | 2,477 / 2,477 | $245,588 |
| March 9, 2017 | Uncasville | United States | Mohegan Sun Arena | 7,096 / 7,096 | $371,512 |
| March 11, 2017 | Philadelphia | United States | The Fillmore Philadelphia | 2,500 / 2,500 | $227,715 |
| March 12, 2017 | Jacksonville | United States | Florida Theater | 1,900 / 1,900 | $236,013 |
| March 14, 2017 | New York City | United States | Hammerstein Ballroom | 3,457 / 3,457 | $317,664 |
Europe
| March 21, 2017 | Barcelona | Spain | Sant Jordi Club | 4,613 / 4,613 | $406,582 |
| March 23, 2017 | Milan | Italy | Fabrique | — | — |
| March 25, 2017 | Hamburg | Germany | Alsterdorfer Sporthalle | 7,000 / 7,000 | $499,876 |
| March 27, 2017 | Warsaw | Poland | Torwar Hall | 6,757 / 6,757 | $611,497 |
| March 29, 2017 | Stuttgart | Germany | Porsche-Arena | 6,292 / 6,292 | $475,162 |
| March 30, 2017 | Zürich | Switzerland | Samsung Halle | 5,038 / 5,038 | $386,311 |
| April 1, 2017 | Esch-sur-Alzette | Luxembourg | Rockhal | 6,075 / 6,075 | $463,654 |
| April 2, 2017 | Brussels | Belgium | Forest National | 8,377 / 8,377 | $569,721 |
| April 4, 2017 | Düsseldorf | Germany | Mitsubishi Electric Halle | 7,184 / 7,184 | $498,450 |
| April 5, 2017 | Amsterdam | Netherlands | AFAS Live | 5,888 / 5,888 | $430,616 |
| April 7, 2017 | Manchester | England | O_{2} Apollo Manchester | 3,351 / 3,351 | $269,627 |
| April 9, 2017 | London | England | Hammersmith Apollo | 10,046 / 10,046 | $812,480 |
| April 10, 2017 | London | England | Hammersmith Apollo | 10,046 / 10,046 | $812,480 |
| April 12, 2017 | Paris | France | L'Olympia | 5,544 / 5,544 | $446,031 |
| April 13, 2017 | Paris | France | L'Olympia | 5,544 / 5,544 | $446,031 |
Latin America
| May 2, 2017 | Santiago | Chile | Movistar Arena | 12,537 / 12,537 | $1,121,691 |
| May 4, 2017 | Buenos Aires | Argentina | Hipódromo Argentino de Palermo | 16,495 / 16,495 | $1,624,769 |
| May 6, 2017 | São Paulo | Brazil | Allianz Parque | 13,533 / 13,533 | $1,470,819 |
| May 9, 2017 | San José | Costa Rica | Estadio Nacional | 8,454 / 8,454 | $559,959 |
| May 11, 2017 | San Juan | Puerto Rico | José Miguel Agrelot Coliseum | 5,693 / 5,693 | $481,050 |
| May 13, 2017 | Punta Cana | Dominican Republic | Hard Rock Hotel and Casino | 3,153 / 3,153 | $396,963 |
| May 17, 2017 | Mexico City | Mexico | National Auditorium | 18,620 / 18,620 | $1,247,937 |
| May 18, 2017 | Mexico City | Mexico | National Auditorium | 18,620 / 18,620 | $1,247,937 |
| May 20, 2017 | Monterrey | Mexico | Auditorio Citibanamex | 5,746 / 5,746 | $309,195 |
| May 21, 2017 | Guadalajara | Mexico | Telmex Auditorium | 7,789 / 7,789 | $576,517 |
Asia
| May 28, 2017 | Singapore | | Singapore Indoor Stadium | 6,099 / 6,099 | $873,002 |
| May 31, 2017 | Seoul | South Korea | Hyundai Card Understage | 450 / 450 | $80,921 |
| June 3, 2017 | Hong Kong | | Hong Kong Convention and Exhibition Centre | 6,612 / 6,612 | $842,007 |
| June 6, 2017 | Tokyo | Japan | Nippon Budokan | 29,994 / 29,994 | $3,655,943 |
| June 7, 2017 | Tokyo | Japan | Nippon Budokan | 29,994 / 29,994 | $3,655,943 |
| June 8, 2017 | Tokyo | Japan | Nippon Budokan | 29,994 / 29,994 | $3,655,943 |
| June 10, 2017 | Osaka | Japan | Osaka Municipal Gymnasium | 7,987 / 7,987 | $920,229 |
Europe – Leg 2
| June 16, 2017 | Rättvik | Sweden | Dalhalla | 5,483 / 5,483 | $599,586 |
| June 18, 2017 | Bodø | Norway | Nordlandshallen | 10,000 / 10,000 | $857,239 |
| June 20, 2017 | Ålesund | Norway | Color Line Stadion | 11,245 / 11,245 | $933,492 |
| June 21, 2017 | Bergen | Norway | Bergenhus Fortress | 6,133 / 6,133 | $497,425 |
| June 23, 2017 | Prague | Czech Republic | Metronome Festival | — | — |
| June 24, 2017 | Mönchengladbach | Germany | Open Air Sommer | 10,516 / 10,516 | $826,245 |
| June 25, 2017 | Lille | France | North Summer Festival | — | — |
| June 27, 2017 | Sønderborg | Denmark | Mølleparken | 4,347 / 4,347 | $427,477 |
| June 28, 2017 | Dresden | Germany | Filmnachte am Elbufer | 5,888 / 5,888 | $448,530 |
| July 5, 2017 | Madrid | Spain | Universal Music Festival | — | — |
| July 6, 2017 | Barcelona | Spain | Festival Jardins Pedralbes | — | — |
| July 8, 2017 | Ávila | Spain | Festival Músicos en la Naturaleza | — | — |
| July 9, 2017 | Argelès-sur-Mer | France | Festival Les Deferlantes | — | — |
| July 11, 2017 | Upper Austria | Austria | Burg Clam | — | — |
| July 12, 2017 | Sion | Switzerland | Festival Sion Sous Les Étoiles | — | — |
| July 14, 2017 | Aix-les-Bains | France | Musilac Music Festival | — | — |
| July 16, 2017 | Vila Nova de Gaia | Portugal | Festival Marés Vivas | — | — |
| July 17, 2017 | Málaga | Spain | Marenostrum Music Castle Park | — | — |
| July 19, 2017 | Locarno | Switzerland | Moons and Stars Festival | — | — |
| July 20, 2017 | Juan-les-Pins | France | Jazz in Juan-les-Pins | — | — |
| July 22, 2017 | Regensburg | Germany | Schlossfestpiele | — | — |
| July 23, 2017 | Künzelsau | Germany | Würth Open Air | — | — |
| July 25, 2017 | Cividale del Friuli | Italy | Parco Della Lesa | — | — |
| July 26, 2017 | Pula | Croatia | Pula Arena | — | — |
| July 28, 2017 | Mantua | Italy | Piazza Sordello | — | — |
| July 29, 2017 | Saint-Tropez | France | Nuits de la Citadelle Festival | — | — |
| July 31, 2017 | Colmar | France | Foire aux Vins de Colmar | — | — |
| August 1, 2017 | Uelzen | Germany | Almased Arena | — | — |
North America – Leg 2
| August 29, 2017 | Lenox | United States | Tanglewood | — | — |
| August 30, 2017 | Saratoga Springs | United States | Saratoga Performing Arts Center | 5,878 / 6,154 | $461,030 |
| September 1, 2017 | Bethel | United States | Bethel Woods Center | 6,678 / 17,164 | $440,067 |
| September 2, 2017 | Boston | United States | Leader Bank Pavilion | 5,053 / 5,160 | $435,755 |
| September 3, 2017 | Atlantic City | United States | Borgata Event Center | 2,103 / 2,385 | $331,406 |
Europe – Leg 3
| September 16, 2017 | Sofia | Bulgaria | Arena Armeec | 15,336 / 15,336 | $737,257 |
| September 17, 2017 | Belgrade | Serbia | Kombank Arena | 12,940 / 12,940 | $604,668 |
| September 19, 2017 | Munich | Germany | Olympiahalle | 8,908 / 8,908 | $713,044 |
| September 22, 2017 | Mannheim | Germany | SAP Arena | 6,737 / 6,737 | $571,631 |
| September 24, 2017 | Copenhagen | Denmark | Royal Arena | 7,309 / 7,309 | $748,398 |
| September 25, 2017 | Oslo | Norway | Oslo Spektrum | 6,729 / 6,729 | $642,908 |
| September 26, 2017 | Stavanger | Norway | DNB Arena | 5,212 / 5,212 | $584,973 |
| September 28, 2017 | Helsinki | Finland | Hartwall Arena | 9,972 / 9,972 | $894,977 |
| September 29, 2017 | Tallinn | Estonia | Saku Suurhall | 9,420 / 9,420 | $652,780 |
| October 1, 2017 | Saint Petersburg | Russia | Ice Palace | 11,634 / 11,634 | $852,487 |
| October 3, 2017 | Moscow | Russia | Olimpiysky | 22,429 / 22,429 | $2,647,148 |
| October 6, 2017 | Kyiv | Ukraine | Palace of Sports | 8,600 / 8,600 | $975,206 |
| October 8, 2017 | Minsk | Belarus | Minsk-Arena | 8,009 / 8,009 | $653,969 |
| October 10, 2017 | Kaunas | Lithuania | Žalgiris Arena | 10,501 / 10,501 | $697,568 |
| October 12, 2017 | Kraków | Poland | Tauron Arena Kraków | 17,166 / 17,166 | $1,181,936 |
| October 13, 2017 | Budapest | Hungary | Budapest Sports Arena | 13,661 / 13,661 | $946,978 |
| October 15, 2017 | Skopje | Macedonia | Boris Trajkovski Sports Center | 7,352 / 7,352 | $403,835 |
| October 17, 2017 | Cluj-Napoca | Romania | Polyvalent Hall | 9,408 / 10,131 | $588,878 |
| Total | | | | — | — |
