= Synchronicity Tour =

1983–1984 concert tour by the Police

- Tour by The Police
- Tour program
- Associated album: Synchronicity
- Start date: 23 July 1983
- End date: 4 March 1984
- Legs: 6
- No. of shows: 66 in North America; 36 in Europe; 3 in Australia; 105 total

The Police concert chronology
- Ghost in the Machine Tour (1981–1982); Synchronicity Tour (1983–1984); A Conspiracy of Hope (1986)

The Synchronicity Tour was a 1983–1984 concert tour by the Police to promote their fifth album, Synchronicity. It commenced on July 23, 1983 in Chicago and concluded on March 4, 1984 in Melbourne. It touched three continents for a total of 105 shows.

== History ==
During the early dates in the first North American leg, the band resided at a mansion in Bridgehampton, New York and were flown to the concerts. This was the band's final tour as a working unit and one of the highest-grossing tours of the 1980s.

As the band's album Synchronicity featured an extensive use of backing vocals Stewart Copeland and Andy Summers were not able to replicate live due to the intricacies of their drums and guitar parts, the live set was augmented by three vocalists – Michelle Cobb, Dolette McDonald and Tessa Niles. This was only the second time the Police would work with additional musicians on stage, the first being the use of a horns section during the Ghost in the Machine Tour in 1981.

The grandiosity of the tour and the expectations around it – it came at the end of a five-years progression that saw the Police growing from underground phenomenon to global superstar – put a lot of stress on the band members. "I was never relaxed," drummer Stewart Copeland recalled. "I had so much anxiety. And I know how crazy that must sound to people who do real jobs." Copeland did however cite the 18 August show at Shea Stadium as the peak of "Policemania": "Playing Shea Stadium was big because, even though I'm a septic tank (rhyming slang for 'Yank'), The Police is an English band and I'm a Londoner – an American Londoner – so it felt like conquering America."

According to Sting, the band's performance at Shea Stadium constituted the peak of their career. "I realized that you can't get better than this, you can't climb a mountain higher than this. This is Everest. I made the decision on stage that ok, this is it, this is where this thing stops, right now."

The November 2 and 3 shows in Atlanta were filmed and recorded for a live album and a video release. Synchronicity Concert was originally issued on VHS in 1984 under the direction of Godley & Creme, who had also been responsible for directing all the music videos from Synchronicity. The film would later be released on DVD in 2005. The album was mixed but did not materalize until 1995 when it was packaged together with one of the band's early gigs at the Orpheum Theatre in Boston under the title Live!. The double album was produced by Andy Summers.

== Setlist ==
The following setlist is obtained from the 18 August 1983 concert held at the Shea Stadium in New York City. It does not represent all concerts during the tour. For the whole duration of the tour, the setlist largely revolved around Synchronicity. All songs from the album, with the exceptions of "Mother" and "Miss Gradenko", were performed. "Invisible Sun" and "Don't Stand So Close to Me", from Ghost in the Machine and Zenyatta Mondatta respectively, were performed mostly during the European leg of the tour. During "Hole in My Life" Sting would occasionally add snippets of The Beatles' "Fixing a Hole" or Ray Charles' "Hit the Road Jack".

1. "Voices Inside My Head"
2. "Synchronicity I" / "Synchronicity II"
3. "Walking in Your Footsteps"
4. "Message in a Bottle"
5. "Demolition Man" (some shows)
6. "Walking on the Moon"
7. "O My God"
8. "De Do Do Do, De Da Da Da"
9. "Wrapped Around Your Finger'
10. "Tea in the Sahara"
11. "Spirits in the Material World"
12. "Hole in My Life"
13. "One World (Not Three)"
14. "King of Pain"
15. "Every Breath You Take"
16. "Murder by Numbers"

Encore

18. "Roxanne"
18. "Every Little Thing She Does Is Magic" (some shows)
19. "Can't Stand Losing You" / "Reggatta de Blanc"
20. "Next to You" (some shows)
20. "So Lonely"

== Opening acts ==
- Joan Jett & The Blackhearts (Chicago, Detroit, Pittsburgh, New York City, Philadelphia, Indianapolis)
- A Flock of Seagulls (Chicago, Rochester, Foxborough, Tallahassee)
- The Fixx (Fresno, Chicago, Toronto, Rochester, Foxborough, Lexington, Knoxville, Miami, Tacoma, Inglewood, Atlanta, Orlando)
- Ministry (Chicago, Minneapolis)
- Stevie Ray Vaughan (Montreal, Honolulu)
- Peter Tosh (Montreal, Toronto)
- Talking Heads (Montreal)
- Blue Peter (Toronto)
- King Sunny Adé (Toronto)
- James Brown (Toronto)
- R.E.M. (Hartford, New York City, Norfolk, Philadelphia, Landover)
- Madness (Philadelphia, San Diego, Phoenix)
- Thompson Twins (Fresno, Vancouver, Winnipeg, Edmonton, Phoenix, Tacoma, Inglewood)
- Oingo Boingo (San Diego, Fresno, Oakland)
- The Animals (Orlando, Miami)
- UB40 (Denver, Kansas City, Dallas, Houston, Austin, Oklahoma City, Champaign)
- Passionate Friends (St Austell, Birmingham)
- Bryan Adams (Sydney, Melbourne, Honolulu)
- Australian Crawl (Melbourne)
- Sunnyboys (Sydney, Melbourne)
- Kids in the Kitchen (Melbourne)
- Split Enz (Richfield, OH)
- Berlin (Inglewood, CA)
- Re-Flex (Syracuse, Providence, Memphis, Williamsburg, Buffalo, Carbondale, Cincinnati, Greensboro)
- Kissing the Pink (Baton Rouge, Biloxi)
- China Crisis (Edinburgh, Glasgow, Blackpool)
- The Alarm(Brighton)

== Tour dates ==
List of tour dates, showing date, city, country, venue, attendance, gross
Date	City	Country	Venue	Attendance	Gross
North America
23 July 1983	Chicago	United States	Comiskey Park	44,622 / 50,000	$651,243
24 July 1983	St. Louis	United States	Checkerdome	20,095 / 20,095	$227,902
25 July 1983	Indianapolis	United States	Market Square Arena	16,041 / 16,041	$210,525
28 July 1983	Detroit	United States	Joe Louis Arena	36,345 / 36,345	$445,226
29 July 1983	Detroit	United States	Joe Louis Arena	36,345 / 36,345	$445,226
30 July 1983	Cleveland	United States	Richfield Coliseum	18,728 / 18,728	$234,100
2 August 1983	Montreal	Canada	Spectrum de Montréal	N/A	
3 August 1983	Montreal	Canada	Olympic Stadium	38,617 / 40,000	$690,416
5 August 1983	Toronto	Canada	CNE Grandstand	N/A	
7 August 1983	Rochester	United States	Holleder Memorial Stadium	30,000 / 30,000	$450,000
8 August 1983	Pittsburgh	United States	Civic Arena	15,222 / 15,222	$209,514
10 August 1983	Foxborough	United States	Sullivan Stadium	61,000 / 61,000	$1,003,000
12 August 1983	Hartford	United States	Hartford Civic Center	32,151 / 32,151	$463,715
13 August 1983	Hartford	United States	Hartford Civic Center	32,151 / 32,151	$463,715
15 August 1983	Norfolk	United States	Scope Auditorium	N/A	
18 August 1983	New York City	United States	Shea Stadium	67,000 / 67,000	$1,130,000
20 August 1983	Philadelphia	United States	John F. Kennedy Stadium	N/A	
21 August 1983	Landover	United States	Capital Centre	N/A	
22 August 1983	Landover	United States	Capital Centre	N/A	
24 August 1983	Bloomington	United States	Met Center	N/A	
25 August 1983	Bloomington	United States	Met Center	14,709 / 17,000	$210,437
27 August 1983	Winnipeg	Canada	Winnipeg Arena	16,246 / 16,246	$241,848
29 August 1983	Edmonton	Canada	Northlands Coliseum	17,043 / 17,043	$256,771
31 August 1983	Vancouver	Canada	Pacific Coliseum	16,357 / 16,357	$287,001
1 September 1983	Tacoma	United States	Tacoma Dome	N/A	
3 September 1983	Portland	United States	Portland Memorial Coliseum	N/A	
5 September 1983	San Diego	United States	Aztec Bowl	20,000 / 20,000	$298,950
6 September 1983	Inglewood	United States	Hollywood Park Racetrack	N/A	
8 September 1983	Phoenix	United States	Phoenix Municipal Stadium	21,330 / 23,000	$322,783
10 September 1983	Oakland	United States	Oakland–Alameda County Coliseum	59,800 / 59,800	$1,066,500
11 September 1983	Fresno	United States	Ratcliffe Stadium	N/A	
Europe
17 September 1983	Augsburg	West Germany	Rosenaustadion	N/A	
18 September 1983	Darmstadt	West Germany	Stadion am Böllenfalltor	N/A	
20 September 1983	Dijon	France	Palais des Congrès	N/A	
21 September 1983	Paris	France	Vélodrome de Vincennes	N/A	
23 September 1983	Nîmes	France	Arènes de Nîmes	N/A	
24 September 1983	Fréjus	France	Amphithéâtre de Fréjus	N/A	
26 September 1983	Nantes	France	Parc des Expositions de la Beaujoire	N/A	
27 September 1983	Toulouse	France	Palais des Sports de Toulouse	N/A	
30 September 1983	Madrid	Spain	Estadio Román Valero	N/A	
1 October 1983	Barcelona	Spain	Camp Municipal Narcís Sala	N/A	
3 October 1983	Lyon	France	Palais des Sports de Gerland	N/A	
4 October 1983	Rotterdam	Netherlands	Rotterdam Ahoy Sportpaleis	N/A	
6 October 1983	Cologne	West Germany	Sporthalle Köln	N/A	
7 October 1983	Hamburg	West Germany	Ernst-Merck-Halle	N/A	
9 October 1983	West Berlin	West Germany	Eissporthalle an der Jafféstraße	N/A	
10 October 1983	Dortmund	West Germany	Westfalenhalle	N/A	
13 October 1983	Copenhagen	Denmark	Brøndby Stadium	N/A	
14 October 1983	Stockholm	Sweden	Johanneshovs Isstadion	N/A	
North America
28 October 1983	Miami	United States	Miami Orange Bowl	48,920 / 48,920	$742,895
29 October 1983	Orlando	United States	Florida Citrus Bowl	N/A	
31 October 1983	Tallahassee	United States	Tallahassee-Leon County Civic Center	N/A	
2 November 1983	Atlanta	United States	Omni Coliseum	33,174 / 33,174	$418,990
3 November 1983	Atlanta	United States	Omni Coliseum	33,174 / 33,174	$418,990
5 November 1983	Knoxville	United States	Stokely Athletic Center	12,268 / 12,268	$168,539
6 November 1983	Lexington	United States	Rupp Arena	21,805 / 21,805	$286,279
8 November 1983	Birmingham	United States	BJCC Coliseum	14,638 / 14,638	$197,613
10 November 1983	Baton Rouge	United States	LSU Assembly Center	13,014 / 13,014	$175,689
11 November 1983	Biloxi	United States	Mississippi Coast Coliseum	14,980 / 14,980	$202,230
13 November 1983	Dallas	United States	Reunion Arena	34,813 / 36,000	$465,494
14 November 1983	Dallas	United States	Reunion Arena	34,813 / 36,000	$465,494
16 November 1983	Houston	United States	The Summit	33,141 / 33,141	$452,485
17 November 1983	Houston	United States	The Summit	33,141 / 33,141	$452,485
19 November 1983	Austin	United States	Southpark Meadows	N/A	
20 November 1983	Oklahoma City	United States	MCC Arena	N/A	
22 November 1983	Denver	United States	McNichols Sports Arena	17,706 / 17,706	$259,524
24 November 1983	Kansas City	United States	Kemper Arena	N/A	
25 November 1983	Park City	United States	Kansas Coliseum	N/A	
27 November 1983	Cedar Falls	United States	UNI-Dome	18,718 / 20,000	$277,500
28 November 1983	Champaign	United States	Assembly Hall	N/A	
Europe
8 December 1983	Edinburgh	Scotland	Edinburgh Playhouse	N/A	
9 December 1983	Edinburgh	Scotland	Edinburgh Playhouse	N/A	
11 December 1983	Glasgow	Scotland	Apollo	N/A	
12 December 1983	Blackpool	England	Opera House Theatre	N/A	
14 December 1983	Nottingham	England	Nottingham Royal Concert Hall	N/A	
15 December 1983	Leeds	England	Queens Hall	N/A	
17 December 1983	St Austell	England	Cornwall Coliseum	N/A	
18 December 1983	St Austell	England	Cornwall Coliseum	N/A	
20 December 1983	Birmingham	England	NEC Arena	N/A	
21 December 1983	Birmingham	England	NEC Arena	N/A	
23 December 1983	Brighton	England	Brighton Centre	N/A	
24 December 1983	Brighton	England	Brighton Centre	N/A	
27 December 1983	London	England	Wembley Arena	N/A	
28 December 1983	London	England	Wembley Arena	N/A	
30 December 1983	London	England	Wembley Arena	N/A	
31 December 1983	London	England	Wembley Arena	N/A	
30 January 1984	Rome	Italy	Palazzo dello Sport	N/A	
31 January 1984	Rome	Italy	Palazzo dello Sport	N/A	
North America
4 February 1984	Syracuse	United States	Carrier Dome	N/A	
5 February 1984	Providence	United States	Providence Civic Center	13,349 / 13,349	$227,235
7 February 1984	Atlantic City	United States	Boardwalk Hall	18,186 / 18,186	$298,567
8 February 1984	Williamsburg	United States	William & Mary Hall	N/A	
10 February 1984	Greensboro	United States	Greensboro Coliseum	31,106 / 31,106	$419,688
11 February 1984	Greensboro	United States	Greensboro Coliseum	31,106 / 31,106	$419,688
13 February 1984	Charleston	United States	Charleston Civic Center	11,259 / 13,202	$166,170
14 February 1984	Cincinnati	United States	Riverfront Coliseum	N/A	
16 February 1984	Memphis	United States	Mid-South Coliseum	11,401 / 11,401	$171,015
17 February 1984	Carbondale	United States	SIU Arena	N/A	
19 February 1984	Rosemont	United States	Rosemont Horizon	N/A	
20 February 1984	Milwaukee	United States	MECCA Arena	N/A	
22 February 1984	Buffalo	United States	Buffalo Memorial Auditorium	N/A	
Oceania
25 February 1984	Honolulu	United States	Aloha Stadium	N/A	
29 February 1984	Auckland	New Zealand	Western Springs Stadium	N/A	
2 March 1984	Sydney	Australia	Sydney Showgrounds	N/A	
4 March 1984	Melbourne	Australia	Melbourne Showgrounds	N/A	

== Personnel ==
- Sting – lead vocals, bass guitar, double bass, oboe, pan flute
- Andy Summers – guitar, synthesizer, backing vocals
- Stewart Copeland – drums, percussion, xylophone, backing vocals
- Michelle Cobb – backing vocals
- Dolette McDonald – backing vocals
- Tessa Niles – backing vocals
- Danny Quatrochi – bass guitar on "Invisible Sun" and "Walking on The Moon" on Atlanta shows when Sting was filming with the camera.
