= Synchronicity I =

- Japanese single cover

Single by The Police

from the album Synchronicity
- B-side: "Someone to Talk To"
- Released: 26 October 1983 (Japan)
- Recorded: Late 1982; January 1983
- Studio: AIR, Salem, Montserrat (basic tracks); Le Studio, Morin-Heights, Quebec (overdubs and mixing)
- Genre: New wave; dance-rock
- Length: 3:23
- Label: A&M (AMP-784)
- Songwriter: Sting
- Producers: The Police; Hugh Padgham

The Police Japanese singles chronology
"Every Breath You Take" (1983)	"Synchronicity I" (1983)	"Don't Stand So Close to Me '86" (1986)

"Synchronicity I" is a song by the Police, and the opening track from their album Synchronicity. Written by Sting, the track was also released as a Japanese-only single.

== Background ==
"Synchronicity I", as well as its more famous counterpart "Synchronicity II", features lyrics that are inspired by Carl Jung's theory of synchronicity. Also included in the lyrics is a term from "The Second Coming," "Spiritus Mundi" (translating to "spirit of the world"), which William Butler Yeats used to refer to the collective unconscious, another of Jung's theories. Like some other songs on Synchronicity, "Synchronicity I" is driven by a synthesizer riff.

Although it only served as an album track for Synchronicity in Britain and the US, "Synchronicity I" was released as the second and final single from the album in Japan, backed with "Someone to Talk To," a non-album B-side which appeared as the B-side to "Wrapped Around Your Finger" in Britain and "King of Pain" in the US. The song was also used as the opening track of the band's set-list during the Synchronicity Tour.

When asked how "Synchronicity I" is connected to "Synchronicity II," Stewart Copeland said, "I've had Sting up against the wall on this issue before, and he point blank refuses to explain the connection. None of us in the band can even remember which one's which. The only way I can keep them straight is that 'Synch I' has Sting's cool sequencer part, that 'dunga dunga dung' thing that I, to this day, get all the credit for. People think it's me playing some percussive instrument, and I have to put them right. It was real 'rama-lama' way of starting our set on tour, though it almost killed me to start with that kind of onslaught every night."

According to Summers, "Synchronicity I" and "Synchronicity II" were originally intended to be placed back-to-back on Synchronicity, with a brief instrumental piece serving as a segue.

"We had this section for 'Synchronicity' which we referred to as The Loch. I went in and detuned my guitar synth to C sharp and it produced a great wash of sound, lovely. And there was an acoustic on top, a few cymbals and an oboe, really serene. We were going to have it at the end of 'Synchronicity I' — it was supposed to be the Loch Ness Monster — and then it would go into 'Synchronicity II'. But we couldn't really get it to work. Miles (Copeland) didn't like it... it was too psychedelic for him."

The 2024 Super Deluxe box set of Synchronicity includes this piece under the title "Loch".

== Reception ==
Robert Santelli of Relix Magazine said, "'Synchronicity I' is as close as the Police have ever flirted with musical anarchy: nothing seems to fit as each musician drains himself with relentless pokes and punches that ultimately ends in a KO." New Musical Express writer Richard Cook described the song as "a revision of 'Message in a Bottle' dynamics to sweep aside the cobwebs of inactivity." Adam Sweeting of Melody Maker claimed, "Indeed listening to this opening track, 'Synchronicity I', it doesn't take much of a leap of imagination to foresee the Police as a fusion group." It was noted as "a trifle explaining the title concept [of Synchronicity]" by Richard C. Walls of Creem.

In a retrospective review, Stephen Thomas Erlewine of AllMusic commented positively on "Synchronicity I," saying that on Synchronicity, "the group relies heavily on jazzy textures for Sting's songs, which only work on the jumping, marimba-driven 'Synchronicity I.'"

== Personnel ==
- Sting – bass, vocals, keyboards, drum machine
- Andy Summers – guitar, keyboards
- Stewart Copeland – drums

== Cover versions ==
The Gil Evans Orchestra produced an instrumental cover of the song. It was performed together with Sting on July 11, 1987, on the occasion of the Umbria Jazz Festival in Perugia.
