= Tea in the Sahara =

1983 song by the Police

Song by The Police

from the album Synchronicity
- Released: 17 June 1983
- Genre: New wave; ambient
- Length: 4:11
- Label: A&M
- Songwriter: Sting
- Producer: The Police

"Tea in the Sahara (Live)"

Single by The Police
- A-side: "King of Pain" (UK); "Wrapped Around Your Finger" (US)
- Released: 1984
- Genre: New wave
- Length: 5:05
- Label: A&M
- Songwriter: Sting
- Producers: The Police; Hugh Padgham

The Police singles chronology
"Synchronicity II" (1983)	"King of Pain" / "'Tea in the Sahara" (Live)" (1984)	"Don't Stand So Close to Me '86" (1986)

Audio
- "Tea in the Sahara" on YouTube

"Tea in the Sahara" is a song by the British new wave band the Police. Written by Sting, the song appeared on the band's final album, Synchronicity. It was written about the Paul Bowles novel The Sheltering Sky.

A live version of "Tea in the Sahara" appeared as the B-side to "King of Pain" in Britain and "Wrapped Around Your Finger" in America.

== Background ==
The lyrics of "Tea in the Sahara" were inspired by the Paul Bowles book The Sheltering Sky. The first section of that book is called "Tea in the Sahara". In it, the character Port is told a story in which three sisters wait for a prince to join them for tea in the Sahara Desert, but the prince never returns. Sting was a fan of the novel, and based the lyrics of the song on the story.

Paul Bowles has written very many books but he wrote a book called The Sheltering Sky which became a film by Bertolucci, a few years ago. I read it long before it was a film. It's one of the most beautiful, sustained, poetic novels I've ever read. It's about Americans that regard themselves as travellers and not tourists, and I class myself in that category. I'm a hopeless tourist, but I'm constantly on the move. There was a story within that story – that was a sort of Arab legend that was told in the story of three sisters who invite a prince to a tea party out in the desert to have tea, tea in the Sahara. They have tea, and it's wonderful, and he promises to come back and he never does. They just wait and wait and wait until it's too late. I just loved this story and wrote a song called "'Tea in the Sahara". I don't know whether Paul Bowles ever heard it, probably not, but it's still one of my favourite songs.

— Sting, 'All This Time' CDROM, 1995

Guitarist Andy Summers, who claimed to have been the one who gave Sting The Sheltering Sky, used a special technique in recording his guitar part for the song, involving turning the guitar up to near-feedback levels and "wobbling" it.

On "Tea in the Sahara" I used what I call, tongue in cheek, my "wobbling cloud" effect. It comes with using a highly overloaded guitar, to the point of feedback, and moving the chord off just as it's about to break. It's a sound I do a lot in concert, this sort of echo guitar, where basically I turn most of the signal off so that all you hear is echo. Then you control it with the volume pedal, so you just hear this floating, shimmering sound. And you've got to play the right chords, you can't play G major or D7 – it sounds cruddy. You've got to play space harmonies to make it more like that – triads with open strings, tended harmonies like 9ths and 11ths, 27ths. It's really all by ear.

— Andy Summers, Guitar World, 4/1987

Despite Sting's affection for the song, he has since said that the track was too fast. He said in 1993, "I've always loved the song. There's so much space in it. But I think we played it too fast on the album and live."

== Critical reception ==
In his review for Rolling Stone Stephen Holden characterised "Tea in the Sahara" as "Synchronicity's moodiest, most tantalizing song", calling it an "aural mirage that brings back the birdcalls and jungle sounds of earlier songs as whispering, ghostly instrumental voices." Stephen Thomas Erlewine of AllMusic said that the song was "hypnotic in its measured, melancholy choruses." Ultimate Classic Rock critic Mike Duquette described the song as "a fable about broken promises".

== Live version ==
In addition to its studio release on Synchronicity, a live version of "Tea in the Sahara" from the Synchronicity Tour, was released as the B-side to "King of Pain" in Britain and "Wrapped Around Your Finger" in America. This version also appeared on Message in a Box: The Complete Recordings.

This version of "Tea in the Sahara" was not the only live release of the track. A version from Sting's first solo tour can be found on his live album, Bring on the Night, while a version from a Sting MTV Unplugged session appeared on the 1993 "If I Ever Lose My Faith in You" CD single.

== Personnel ==
- Sting – lead vocals, bass guitar, oboe
- Andy Summers – guitar
- Stewart Copeland – drums
