= 57th & 9th =

Studio album by Sting
- Released: 11 November 2016
- Recorded: Summer 2016
- Studio: Avatar, New York City; Sear Sound, New York City
- Genre: Pop rock
- Length: 37:05
- Label: Cherrytree, Interscope, A&M
- Producer: Martin Kierszenbaum

Sting chronology
The Last Ship (2013)	57th & 9th (2016)	44/876 (2018)

Singles from 57th & 9th
- 1. "I Can't Stop Thinking About You" Released: 1 September 2016; 2. "50,000" Released: 22 September 2016

57th & 9th is the twelfth solo studio album by British singer-songwriter Sting, his first rock album in 13 years, released on 11 November 2016. The album sold over 600,000 copies worldwide in 2016 and contains "The Empty Chair" which earned Sting his 4th nomination for Best Original Song at the 89th Academy Awards (but lost to "City of Stars" from La La Land).

== Background and release ==
The album was recorded over a period of three months. Sting has said of the tight deadline: "Artificially reintroducing that pressure gave the album a kind of urgency it wouldn't have had otherwise."

The album title is a reference to the New York intersection Sting crossed every day to get to Avatar Studios in Hell's Kitchen where much of the album was recorded.

From late 2015 and throughout the first half of 2016, images of Sting working in the studio were periodically published across his various social media outlets. The resultant album was eventually announced on 18 July 2016. In a teaser video published subsequently, Sting described the album as having a spontaneous feel, featuring "a lot of rock 'n' roll" with themes of searching, travelling, the road and the pull of the unknown.

== Music and lyrics ==
Sting wrote "50,000" the week of Prince's death, and in memory of several famous musicians who died in late 2015 and 2016: Prince, David Bowie, Glenn Frey, and Lemmy.

"One Fine Day" is a plea for sanity regarding anthropogenic climate change.

According to Rolling Stone magazine on 11 November 2016, Sting "offers a kind of travelogue through his own musical past, from the Chaucer-y balladry of 'Heading South on the Great North Road' to 'If You Can’t Love Me,' a mordantly Kafkaesque echo of the jazz rock Sting made in the Eighties."

"Inshallah" is a Middle East-tinged refugee's prayer. The Arabic word "Inshallah" means "If God wills", or in Sting's words: "If it's God's will then it shall be".

"The Empty Chair" is a song inspired by American journalist James Foley who was kidnapped and killed by Daesh (a.k.a. Islamic State of Iraq or ISIS).

== Promotion ==
Sting debuted the studio version of "I Can't Stop Thinking About You" – and performed the song live – on 31 August 2016 in the Red Bull Sound Space at L.A. radio station KROQ.

On 22 September 2016, Sting released for free on YouTube the audio version of "50,000".

Sting performed the song "One Fine Day" live for the first time 6 October 2016 on Deutscher Radiopreis.

On 27 October 2016, Sting released for free on YouTube an acoustic version of "I Can't Stop Thinking About You".

On 3 November 2016, Sting released for free on YouTube the audio version of "Petrol Head".

Sting performed two shows on 9 November 2016 at Irving Plaza, a small (only one thousand-people capacity) music venue in Manhattan, New York City, playing songs from 57th & 9th for the first time live in concert: a "57th & 9th iHeartRadio Album Release Party" show (scheduled at 8PM, indeed occurring at 7PM) and a Sting.com Fan Club Member Exclusive Show (scheduled at 11PM, indeed occurring at 10PM).

Backed by a 3-piece band including Dominic Miller (guitar), Vinnie Colaiuta (drums) and Rufus Miller (guitar), Sting performed on 12 November 2016 a (one hour and a half) concert in Paris for the re-opening of the Bataclan, performing even songs from 57th & 9th. (Note: "I Can't Stop Thinking About You", "One Fine Day", "50,000", "Inshallah", "Petrol Head", "Down, Down, Down", "The Empty Chair".) The Police's former guitar player, French native Henry Padovani, joined the band on stage for "Next to You", one of the final encore. (Note: About the 2016 Bataclan re-opening show, Sting stated: "In re-opening the Bataclan, we have two important tasks to reconcile. First, to remember and honour those who lost their lives in the attack a year ago, and second to celebrate the life and the music that this historic theatre represents. In doing so we hope to respect the memory as well as the life affirming spirit of those who fell. We shall not forget them.")

== Supporting tour ==
Sting embarked on the 57th & 9th Tour. The tour began on 1 February 2017, at the Commodore Ballroom in Vancouver.

== Critical reception ==
Professional ratings
Aggregate scores
Source	Rating
AnyDecentMusic?	5.9/10
Metacritic	67/100
Review scores
Source	Rating
AllMusic	4/5 stars
The Guardian	2/5 stars
The Independent	3/5 stars
Rolling Stone	3.5/5 stars

57th & 9th received generally positive reviews from music critics. At Metacritic, which assigns a normalised rating out of 100 to reviews from mainstream critics, the album received an average score of 67, which indicates "generally favorable reviews", based on 8 reviews.

== Track listing ==
Ten new tracks were announced and officially revealed on 31 August 2016.

No.	Title	Writer(s)	Length
1.	"I Can't Stop Thinking About You"	Sting	3:38
2.	"50,000"	Sting, Dominic Miller, Lyle Workman, Josh Freese	4:17
3.	"Down, Down, Down"	Sting, Miller, Vinnie Colaiuta	3:48
4.	"One Fine Day"	Sting, Miller, Workman, Freese	3:14
5.	"Pretty Young Soldier"	Sting, Miller, Workman, Freese	3:06
6.	"Petrol Head"	Sting, Miller, Workman, Freese	3:32
7.	"Heading South on the Great North Road"	Sting	3:18
8.	"If You Can't Love Me"	Sting, Miller, Colaiuta	4:34
9.	"Inshallah"	Sting	4:56
10.	"The Empty Chair"	Sting, J. Ralph	2:49

Deluxe and Super Deluxe Edition bonus tracks
No.	Title	Length
11.	"I Can't Stop Thinking About You" (LA version)	3:38
12.	"Inshallah" (Berlin sessions version)	4:58
13.	"Next to You" (with The Last Bandoleros (live at Rockwood Music Hall))	2:54

Japan Tour Edition bonus tracks
No.	Title	Length
14.	"Fragile" (Live at the Bataclan)	4:11
15.	"Message in a Bottle" (Live at the Bataclan)	5:48
16.	"I Can't Stop Thinking About You" (Live at the Bataclan)	3:47
17.	"One Fine Day" (Live at the Bataclan)	3:13
18.	"Englishman in New York (Reggae Version)" (Live at the Bataclan)	5:15
19.	"Every Breath You Take" (Live at the Bataclan)	5:30

== Personnel ==
- Sting – vocals, bass (1–6, 8, 9), acoustic piano (4), guitars (7, 9, 10), percussion (9)
- Dominic Miller – guitars (1–9, 11, 12), 12-string guitar (3), shaker (9)
- Lyle Workman – guitars (2, 4, 5, 6)
- Jerry Fuentes – backing vocals (2), guitars (10, 11, 13)
- Jean-Baptiste Moussarie – guitars (12)
- Vinnie Colaiuta – drums (1, 3, 8, 9)
- Josh Freese – drums (2, 4, 5, 6)
- Rhani Krija – percussion (1, 3, 8, 11, 12)
- Martin Kierszenbaum – organ (1–5, 8, 11), acoustic piano (4), Mellotron (5), keyboards (9, 12)
- Rob Mathes – acoustic piano (8)
- Percy Cardona – accordion (13)
- Razan Nassreddine – zither (12), vocals (12)
- Derek James – guitars (13)
- Diego Navaira – bass (11), guitars (13)
- Zach Jones – drums (11)
- Emilo Navaira – drums (13)
- Salam Al Hassan – percussion (12)
- Accad Al Saed – percussion (12)
- Thabet Azzawi – oud (12)
- Nadim Sarrouh – oud (12)
- Nabil Alchami – clarinet (12)
- Marion Enachescu – violin (12)
- The Last Bandoleros [Jerry Fuentes, Derek James and Diego Navaira] – backing vocals (1, 11), vocals [with Emilo Navaira] (13)

Live Track Credits (14–19)

- Sting – vocals, guitars, bass
- Dominic Miller – guitars
- Rufus Miller – guitars, backing vocals
- Vinnie Colaiuta – drums
- Mäel Guézel – darbuka
- Ibrahim Maalouf – trumpet

== Production ==
- Martin Kierszenbaum – producer (1–12, 14–19)
- Jerry Fuentes – producer (13)
- Donal Hodgson – recording (1–6, 8, 9, 12, 13)
- Tony Lake – recording (1–13), mixing (11), additional mix engineer (14–19)
- Clif Norrell – recording (2, 4, 5, 6)
- Philip Krause – recording (12)
- Thomas Dappelo – recording (14–19)
- Thom Beemer – assistant engineer
- Jeff Citron – assistant engineer
- Tyler Hartman – assistant engineer
- Richard Kinnon – assistant engineer
- Owen Mulholland – assistant engineer
- Grant Valentine – assistant engineer
- Robert Orton – mixing (1–10, 12, 13), mastering (14–19)
- Bob Ludwig – mastering (1–13)
- Danny Quatrochi – guitar technician for Sting
- Lawrence Azerrad – art direction, design
- Eric Ryan Anderson – photography
- Cherrytree Management – management

Studios

- Recorded at Avatar Studios and Sear Sound (New York, NY).
- Additional recording at Rockwood Music Hall (New York, NY); Nightbird Studios (West Hollywood, CA); Emil Berliner Studios (Berlin, Germany).
- Tracks 14–19 recorded at Le Bataclan (Paris, France).
- Tracks 14–19 mixed at Studio De La Grande Armée (Paris, France).
- Tracks 1–13 mastered at Gateway Mastering (Portland, ME); Tracks 14–19 mastered at Studio De La Grande Armée.

== Charts ==
=== Weekly charts ===
Chart (2016–17)	Peak position
Australian Albums (ARIA)	9
Austrian Albums (Ö3 Austria)	6
Belgian Albums (Ultratop Flanders)	8
Belgian Albums (Ultratop Wallonia)	4
Canadian Albums (Billboard)	18
Czech Albums (ČNS IFPI)	4
Danish Albums (Hitlisten)	21
Dutch Albums (Album Top 100)	7
Finnish Albums (Suomen virallinen lista)	25
French Albums (SNEP)	6
German Albums (Offizielle Top 100)	3
Hungarian Albums (MAHASZ)	16
Irish Albums (IRMA)	22
Italian Albums (FIMI)	6
New Zealand Albums (RMNZ)	25
Polish Albums (ZPAV)	2
Portuguese Albums (AFP)	7
Scottish Albums (OCC)	13
Spanish Albums (PROMUSICAE)	15
Swedish Albums (Sverigetopplistan)	6
Swiss Albums (Schweizer Hitparade)	3
UK Albums (OCC)	15
US Billboard 200	9
US Top Rock Albums (Billboard)	2

=== Year-end charts ===
Chart (2016)	Position
Belgian Albums (Ultratop Flanders)	128
Belgian Albums (Ultratop Wallonia)	84
Italian Albums (FIMI)	69
Swiss Albums (Schweizer Hitparade)	96

Chart (2017)	Position
Belgian Albums (Ultratop Wallonia)	185
US Top Rock Albums (Billboard)	60

== Certifications ==
Region	Certification	Certified units/sales
France	—	25,000
Poland (ZPAV)	2× Platinum	40,000^{‡}
Summaries
Worldwide	—	600,000
^{‡} Sales+streaming figures based on certification alone.
