= Wrapped Around Your Finger =

1983 single by the Police

- European picture sleeve

Single by the Police

from the album Synchronicity
- B-side: "Someone to Talk To" (UK); "Tea in the Sahara" (live) (US)
- Released: 15 July 1983 (UK); 2 January 1984 (US)
- Recorded: December 1982–February 1983
- Studio: AIR, Salem, Montserrat (basic tracks); Le Studio, Morin-Heights, Quebec (overdubs and mixing)
- Genre: New wave
- Length: 5:13
- Label: A&M (AM 127)
- Songwriter: Sting
- Producers: The Police; Hugh Padgham

The Police UK singles chronology
"Every Breath You Take" (1983)	"Wrapped Around Your Finger" (1983)	"Synchronicity II" (1983)

The Police US singles chronology
"Synchronicity II" (1983)	"Wrapped Around Your Finger'" (1983)	"Don't Stand So Close to Me '86" (1986)

Music video
- "Wrapped Around Your Finger" on YouTube

"Wrapped Around Your Finger" is the second single in the UK (and the fourth single in the US) from the Police's fifth and final studio album Synchronicity (1983). Written by Sting, it was released worldwide by A&M Records and featured the non-album track "Someone to Talk To" as the B-side in the UK, while a live version of "Tea in the Sahara" was the B-side in the US.

== Background ==
Like other tracks on Synchronicity, such as "Every Breath You Take" and "King of Pain," "Wrapped Around Your Finger" was a personal song for Sting. He said in an interview, "'Every Breath You Take', 'Wrapped Around Your Finger' were all about my life."

Sting described "Wrapped Around Your Finger" as "a spiteful song about turning the tables on someone who had been in charge." Like other Police songs from this period, it features mythological and literary references, including the Scylla and Charybdis monsters of Greek mythology, and the German legend of Faust. It has a relatively slow, almost foreboding feel in the beginning verses, modulating to evoke a lighter, triumphant feel during the chorus.

This song is vaguely alchemical and probably about a friend of mine, a professional psychic and my tutor in tarot, with bits of Doctor Faustus and The Sorcerer's Apprentice thrown into the pot for good measure.

— Sting, Lyrics by Sting

== Release ==
"Wrapped Around Your Finger" was released as the follow-up to the worldwide hit "Every Breath You Take." In Britain, it reached No. 7 on the UK Singles Chart in August 1983, and in the US, it was instead released as the fourth single from Synchronicity (after "Every Breath You Take," "King of Pain," and "Synchronicity II"). The single reached No. 8 on the Billboard chart in March 1984. It was their final top 10 hit on the Billboard Hot 100.

The British picture sleeve for "Wrapped Around Your Finger" was released in three colour variations: blue, red, and yellow (consistent with the parent album packaging). The single was also released on a picture disc, each featuring the face of Sting, Andy Summers, or Stewart Copeland. Out of the twelve thousand copies released, however, ten thousand had Sting's face on it, while Summers and Copeland appeared on one thousand each (making the latter two variations somewhat rare.)

The B-side of the song in Britain, "Someone to Talk To," was written by guitarist Andy Summers. Sting refused to provide vocals, leaving Summers to sing. Summers expressed disappointment at this, saying, "Maybe I had just split up from my wife. It was a nice thing I had on the guitar and I was disappointed that Sting wouldn't sing it. That would have given it more of an official stamp." Drummer Stewart Copeland said of this conflict, "Andy did his best on vocals but I too was disappointed that Sting didn't sing it. He was very touchy about lyrics." The American B-side, "Tea in the Sahara" (live), comes from the Synchronicity Tour.

== Critical reception ==
In a positive retrospective review of the song, AllMusic journalist Steve Huey described "Wrapped Around Your Finger" as "a complex take on power dynamics in relationships." He suggested "the complexity of its jumpy rhythms mirrors that of its emotional psychology." AllMusic colleague Stephen Thomas Erlewine described the song as "a devilishly infectious new wave single". Ultimate Classic Rock critic Mike Duquette called it the Police's 14th-greatest song, saying that by now "Sting could stuff Greek myths and references to Faust in his acid-tongued songs and let the sales roll in".

== Music video ==
The music video, directed by Godley & Creme (who directed the videos for "Every Breath You Take" and "Synchronicity II"), furthers the ethereal feeling the song gives off, by having footage of the band performing in a candle-lit, gloomy room, interspersed with scenes of Sting running among tall candlesticks arranged in a sort of maze; in the end, he intentionally knocks all of them down. Andy Summers is shown playing a classical guitar, an instrument not used in any of the Police's recordings.

The music on the recording of the video was played fast and the "singing" was mimed fast. When the music was slowed down to normal speed, the members of the band appear to be moving in slow motion. Drummer Stewart Copeland claimed that he used a similar method for a solo video (performing under the alias of "Klark Kent"), only he "had the music run slowly, so that [he] mimed in slow motion, and then when they synched it up to the music, [he] had this herky-jerky, kinda 'fast-mo' movement, that was still in time with the music, only it was sort of jerky and strange body movements."

Sting praised the video, saying:

It's incredibly atmospheric, and I think the set design is brilliant – there's nothing but all those candles, yet it conjures up so many different feelings and possibilities about the song. When Kevin (Godley) and Lol (Creme) came to me with the idea, I got very excited because I realised that they really understood the imagistic approach I wanted. The whole concept is fairly esoteric – it's really a "Sorcerer's Apprentice" type of idea. The song is cunningly being shot at high speed in order to achieve a special effect when it's eventually played back at normal speed. At least, that's the theory...

— Sting, Playgirl, 10/1983

Andy Summers, however, was critical of Sting's overacting in the video.

I never much liked the idea for "Wrapped Around Your Finger." No, I was kind of pissed off about that one. I've never been much of a fan of that song, actually. Sting got to shoot his part last in that video and made a meal of knocking all the candles out. Fuck him.

— Andy Summers, I Want My MTV

== Track listing ==
=== 7-inch single: A&M UK (AM 127) ===
1. "Wrapped Around Your Finger" – 5:07
2. "Someone to Talk To" – 3:08
- also released on picture disc (AMP127). One per member.

=== 7-inch single: A&M US (AM-2614) ===
1. "Wrapped Around Your Finger" – 5:07
2. "Tea in the Sahara (live)" – 5:03

=== 12-inch single: A&M UK (AMX 127) ===
1. "Wrapped Around Your Finger" – 5:07
2. "Someone to Talk To" – 3:08
3. "Message in a Bottle" (live) – 4:52
4. "I Burn for You" – 4:50

=== 12-inch single: A&M US promo (SP17264) ===
1. "Wrapped Around Your Finger" – 5:07
2. "Wrapped Around Your Finger" (live) – 5:21
3. "Murder by Numbers" – 4:37
4. "Someone to Talk To" – 3:08

== Personnel ==
- Sting – bass guitar, keyboards, lead and backing vocals
- Andy Summers – guitar, effects
- Stewart Copeland – drums, percussion

== Charts ==
Chart (1983–1984)	Peak position
Australia (Kent Music Report)	26
Canadian Singles Chart	10
Dutch Top 40	17
French Singles Chart	6
German Singles Chart	32
Irish Singles Chart	1
Italy (Musica e dischi)	13
NZ Singles Chart	22
Spain (AFYVE)	5
UK Singles Chart	7
US Cashbox	11
US Billboard Hot 100	8
US Adult Contemporary (Billboard)	13
US Mainstream Rock Airplay (Billboard)	9

Year-end chart (1984)	Rank
US Top Pop Singles (Billboard)	85

== Certifications ==
Certifications for "Wrapped Around Your Finger"
Region	Certification	Certified units/sales
New Zealand (RMNZ)	Gold	15,000^{‡}
^{‡} Sales+streaming figures based on certification alone.
