= Sting Summer 2016 Tour =

2016 concert tour by Sting

Summer 2016 Tour
- European tour by Sting
- Start date: 27 July 2016
- End date: 6 August 2016
- Legs: 1
- No. of shows: 9

Sting concert chronology
- Rock Paper Scissors North American Tour (2016); Summer 2016 Tour (2016); 57th & 9th Tour (2017)

The Summer 2016 Tour was a mini concert tour of Europe by English musician Sting.

== Tour dates ==
Date	City	Country	Venue
Europe
27 July 2016	Rome	Italy	Auditorium Parco Della Musica
28 July 2016	Florence	Italy	Auditorium Parco Della Musica
29 July 2016	Milan	Italy	Assago Summer Arena
31 July 2016	Wiesbaden	Germany	Bowling Green
1 August 2016	Berlin	Germany	Waldbuhne
2 August 2016	Sopot	Poland	Sopot
4 August 2016	Skanderborg	Denmark	Smukfest
5 August 2016	Elsinore	Denmark	Kulturværftet
6 August 2016	Hamar	Norway	Stortorget
