= Synchronicity (The Police album) =

- Other copies of the album featured alternate images of the cover.

Studio album by the Police
- Released: 17 June 1983
- Recorded: December 1982 – February 1983
- Studios: AIR (Montserrat); Le Studio (Morin-Heights)
- Genres: New wave; post-punk; pop rock; art rock; jazz fusion
- Length: 39:42; 44:20 (cassette and CD editions)
- Label: A&M
- Producers: The Police; Hugh Padgham

The Police chronology
Ghost in the Machine (1981)	Synchronicity (1983)	Every Breath You Take: The Singles (1986)

Singles from Synchronicity
- 1. "Every Breath You Take" Released: 20 May 1983; 2. "Wrapped Around Your Finger" Released: 15 July 1983; 3. "King of Pain" Released: August 1983 (US); 4. "Synchronicity I" Released: 26 October 1983 (Japan); 5. "Synchronicity II" Released: 28 October 1983

Synchronicity is the fifth and final studio album by the English rock band the Police, released on 17 June 1983 by A&M Records. The band's most successful release, the album includes the hit singles "Every Breath You Take", "King of Pain", "Wrapped Around Your Finger", and "Synchronicity II". The album's title and much of the material for the songs were inspired by Arthur Koestler's book The Roots of Coincidence (1972). At the 1984 Grammy Awards the album was nominated for a total of five awards, including Album of the Year, and won three. At the time of its release and following the Synchronicity Tour, the Police's popularity was at such a high that they were arguably, according to BBC and The Guardian, the "biggest band in the world".

Synchronicity reached number one on both the UK Albums Chart and the US Billboard 200, and sold over eight million copies in the US. The album was widely acclaimed by critics. Praise centered on its cohesive merging of disparate genres and sonic experimentation. Rolling Stone described "each cut on Synchronicity [as] not simply a song but a miniature, discrete soundtrack". It was ranked number 17 in the magazine's lists of the "100 Best Albums of the Eighties" and number 159 on the "500 Greatest Albums of All Time". In 2009, Synchronicity was inducted into the Grammy Hall of Fame. In 2023, the album was selected for preservation in the United States National Recording Registry by the Library of Congress as being "culturally, historically, or aesthetically significant".

== Recording ==
The album's title was inspired by the Carl Jung book Synchronicity: An Acausal Connecting Principle, going so far as to quote the book's title in the lyrics of the albums first song Synchronicity I, singing "Synchronicity...a connecting principle...".

The album marked a significant reduction in the reggae influences that were a part of the band's first four studio albums, instead continuing the trend of production-heavy textures and liberal use of synthesizers featured in their previous album's hit single "Spirits in the Material World". This direction sometimes drove entire songs ("Synchronicity I", "Wrapped Around Your Finger"). The influence of world music can also be heard in songs such as "Tea in the Sahara" and "Walking in Your Footsteps". As opposed to the band's previous effort, Ghost in the Machine, the songs have no overdubbed saxophone(s). Sting explains:

I enjoyed making Ghost in the Machine and playing with the tools of the studio, just building things up and sticking more vocals on. Great fun. But listening to it, I thought. "Hey, my voice on its own sounds as good as fifteen overdubs, so I'll try it on its own." And I've done the saxophone section bit now, I'm bored with it; and Andy [Summers] was into just plunking down one guitar part. I'm glad we did 'Ghost'. I don't regret it. But it was time to change the regime again.

As with Ghost in the Machine, the recording for Synchronicity took place over a period of six weeks, at AIR Studios in Montserrat with the Neve 8078 console beginning in December 1982. The three band members recorded the basic tracks live in separate rooms: Stewart Copeland with his drums in the dining room (connected to the control room via video link), Sting in the control room, and guitarist Andy Summers in the actual studio. According to co-producer and engineer Hugh Padgham, this was done for two reasons: to obtain the best sound for each instrument and "for social reasons." Sting explained how this setup worked for him:

In my case, it's because there is nothing worse than hearing a bass through a set of headphones. Basically, it sounds like a frog farting. I play much better when the sound coming out of the instrument is rich and warm. If we played together like that in the same room, we wouldn't be able to hear anything except the drum, because the guitarist has to have a lot of volume to hit a certain level of distortion or passion or emotion. I play in the studio next to the engineer [Hugh Padgham] so I can hear the instruments balanced and mixed roughly as they'll sound on the record.

While tracking live, the band would do multiple takes of each song. Alongside Padgham, they would listen through each take and select the best parts, which would be edited together into one 'master backing track' before they recorded overdubs (including vocals, which were often bounced down to make room for other overdubs on the 24-track).

During the recording of "Every Breath You Take", Sting and Copeland came to blows with each other, and Padgham nearly quit the project. The song was originally attempted with the live method, but due to numerous failed takes the song had to be assembled entirely from overdubs, including all drum parts.

This album also marked Sting's first time using a sequencer, which features heavily on "Walking in Your Footsteps" (said to be the first track he programmed with it) and "Synchronicity I". It was an Oberheim DSX sequencer, which Sting seemed to enjoy pushing to its limits, and he likened it to HAL in 2001: A Space Odyssey (1968).

Final overdubs and mixing were done within two weeks at Le Studio in Morin-Heights from mid-January to February 1983 using the SSL console with automated mixing. Summers reflects on the transition from recording to mixing:

"It was only after we'd taken a week off [after recording the album on Montserrat] and started hearing it back in Canada, almost for the first time, that we realized it was good. When you're recording there's this terrible, terrible doubt that goes through your mind – 'we just can't do it anymore'. It's unbelievable. Then you finally come out of the studio and the whole thing begins to assume a life and identity of its own."

As recalled in an interview with Studio Sound magazine, Padgham described the routine during the mixing sessions: in the mornings, he would do much of the mixing work while the band were off skiing, then they would return to the studio to help fine-tune the mix by suggesting a few changes and so on. Contrary to this, however, in later interviews he recalled that due to tensions within the group, at least one member of the band would be present at the studio while the other(s) would be skiing. Of the tensions, Padgham remarked that although the tension in the room was sometimes horrible, "in many ways, that tension is what ended up making such a good album."

== Album cover ==
The album's original cover artwork, conceived by Jeff Ayeroff and Norman Moore, consisted of a series of photographs overlaid with transparent horizontal stripes of blue, red, and yellow. The album was available in 36 variations, with different arrangements of the colour stripes and showing different photographs of the band members, taken by Duane Michals. In the most common version Sting is reading a copy of Carl Jung's Synchronicity (1960) on the front cover along with a superimposed negative image of the actual text of the synchronicity hypothesis. A photo on the back cover also shows a close-up, but mirrored and upside-down, image of Jung's book.

== Release ==
Synchronicity was released in the United Kingdom on 17 June 1983. The album was issued on LP, CD, and cassette. Synchronicity debuted at number one on the UK Albums Chart and spent two weeks at the top position. In the United States, the album topped the Billboard 200 in late July and ultimately spent 17 nonconsecutive weeks at number one on the chart, interrupting the dominance of Michael Jackson's Thriller (1982). In Canada, the album went to number one for a record 24 (consecutive) weeks. Synchronicity's 24 weeks at number one surpassed the Saturday Night Fever soundtrack (22 consecutive weeks) for most weeks at number one all-time on the Canadian album charts. It was itself surpassed in 2012 by Adele's album 21 (35 nonconsecutive weeks.) Synchronicity still holds the record for most consecutive weeks at number one in Canada with 24.

Original A&M vinyl pressings were made with a Quiex II process where the record appears black on the turntable but when held up to light turns an opaque purple.

The album was reissued as a remastered gold CD in 1989 by Mobile Fidelity Sound Lab, and on SACD in 2003.

On 29 May 2024, 41 years after the original release, it was announced that a deluxe 6-CD box set (plus a 4-LP box set, picture disc LP, 2-CD and 2-LP colour vinyl) would be released on 26 July to commemorate the 40th anniversary of Synchronicity. This would represent the first time that any material by the band had been given the deluxe treatment, with various editions featuring up to 55 previously unreleased tracks including all original 7” / 12” b-sides plus 11 exclusive non-album bonus tracks, 36 demos or early mixes plus a live show from the accompanying tour. The box set saw a release on 26 July 2024.

== Critical reception ==
Professional ratings
Review scores
Source	Rating
AllMusic	4.5/5 stars
The Baltimore Sun	5/5 stars
Chicago Tribune	2.5/4 stars
Mojo	3/5 stars
Q	4/5 stars
Rolling Stone	4.5/5 stars
The Rolling Stone Album Guide	4/5 stars
The Sacramento Bee	4/4 stars
Smash Hits	9/10
The Village Voice	B+

Professional music critics at the time of release and afterwards have been mostly positive towards the album. Richard Cook of NME called Synchronicity "a record of real passion that is impossible to truly decipher", and felt that "although [the album] magnifies the difference between Sting and Summers and Copeland it also evolves the group into a unique state: a mega-band playing off glittering experimentation against the sounding board of a giant audience. It's the sound of a group coming apart and coming together, a widescreen drama with a fascination at a molecular level. Some of the music fuses intuitive pop genius with willfully dense orchestration so powerfully it stuns. It is occasionally sensational."

In Melody Maker Adam Sweeting was less enthusiastic, saying, "I would guess that devotees of this extremely sussed trio will find plenty to amuse them, and indeed Sting has sown all sorts of cryptic little clues and messages throughout his songs... However impressive bits of Synchronicity sound, I could never fall in love with a group which plans its moves so carefully and which would never do anything just for the hell of it".

Reviewing the 2003 reissue, Mojo's David Buckley stated that "Synchronicity [...] was already, in the time-honoured words of rock journo cliché, 'the work of a disintegrating unit', yet 20 years on it hangs together well". Although noting what he felt was a clear gap in quality between the first and second halves of the album, AllMusic editor Stephen Thomas Erlewine concluded that the "first-rate pop" of the second half ranks among Sting's best work, while also illustrating "that he was ready to leave the Police behind for a solo career, which is exactly what he did." Tom Doyle of Mojo deems it an unusual art rock album whose content contrasted with its major success, adding that although some songs suffer from "the thin, digital reverb-y aural trends of the era," Padgham was nonetheless an ideal choice for co-producer due to his engineering of Peter Gabriel's eponymous 1980 album, "whose echoes could be heard in the marimba-led atmosphere of 'King of Pain' or the sequenced polyrhythms of 'Walking In Your Footsteps'."

The track "Mother" generated controversy, with it widely being viewed as the worst track on Synchronicity. Andy Summers, who wrote the song, explained why it was put on the album: "We all have our family situations, and I had a pretty intense mother who was very focused on me. I was sort of 'the golden child,' and there I was, sort of fulfilling all of her dreams by being this pop star in The Police. I got a certain amount of pressure from her. It's not heavy - it was written kind of ironic, to be kind of funny, but crazy. It's inspired a little bit by Captain Beefheart. It's something that's really off-the-wall. It was very bizarre - I think it freaked the record company out. When the album came out, we had all the press in the world watching us and talking about it. The reviews came in, and that song got written about so much because it was so off-the-wall and so ballsy to do that, because the band was having so much commercial success."

In his review of Synchronicity, Stephen Holden from Rolling Stone noted that "corrosively funny 'Mother' inverts John Lennon's romantic maternal attachment into a grim dadaist joke." PopMatters consider the song "awful". Doyle writes that the song was "boldly tracklisted midway through side one" and described Summers' lead vocal as "[involving] a manic, screaming performance that sounds as if he's auditioning to be Adrian Belew's replacement in (the similarly troubled) King Crimson."

== Accolades ==
In the 1983 Rolling Stone readers' poll, Synchronicity was voted "Album of the Year". It was voted the fifth best album of 1983 in The Village Voice's year-end Pazz & Jop critics' poll. At the 1984 Grammy Awards ceremony, Synchronicity won the award for Best Rock Performance by a Duo or Group with Vocal, and was nominated for Album of the Year. "Every Breath You Take" won the awards for Song of the Year and Best Pop Performance by a Duo or Group with Vocals, and received a nomination for Record of the Year.

In 1989, Synchronicity was ranked No. 17 on Rolling Stone's list of the 100 best albums of the 1980s. Pitchfork ranked the record at No. 55 on its 2002 list of the decade's 100 best albums. In 2006, Q placed Synchronicity at No. 25 on its list of the 40 best 1980s albums. In 2016, Paste ranked Synchronicity sixth on its list of the 50 best new wave albums, and 17th on its list of the 50 best post-punk albums.

Synchronicity has appeared on numerous rankings of the greatest albums of all time. In 2000, it was listed at No. 91 in the Virgin All Time Top 1000 Albums book. In 2003, Synchronicity was ranked No. 455 on Rolling Stone's list of the 500 greatest albums of all time; the album also placed on updates of the list in 2012 (at No. 448) and in 2020 (at No. 159). In 2010, Consequence listed it as the 37th best album of all time. Synchronicity was ranked 50th in VH1's 2001 countdown of the "100 Greatest Albums of Rock & Roll", and 65th in Channel 4's "100 Greatest Albums" in 2005. The Rock and Roll Hall of Fame compiled a list of "The Definitive 200" albums in 2007, placing Synchronicity at No. 119. In 2009, Synchronicity was inducted into the Grammy Hall of Fame. In 2013, it placed at No. 13 in BBC Radio 2's "Top 100 Favourite Albums", a poll voted in by over 100,000 people. Synchronicity was included in the book 1001 Albums You Must Hear Before You Die (2005). Synchronicity was selected by the US Library of Congress for preservation in the National Recording Registry in 2023.

== Track listing ==
All tracks are written and composed by Sting, except where noted.

Side one
No.	Title	Writer(s)	Length
1.	"Synchronicity I"		3:23
2.	"Walking in Your Footsteps"		3:36
3.	"O My God"		4:00
4.	"Mother"	Andy Summers	3:03
5.	"Miss Gradenko"	Stewart Copeland	2:00
6.	"Synchronicity II"		5:04

Side two
No.	Title	Length
7.	"Every Breath You Take"	4:13
8.	"King of Pain"	5:00
9.	"Wrapped Around Your Finger"	5:12
10.	"Tea in the Sahara"	4:11
Total length:		39:42

Bonus track on cassette and CD releases
No.	Title	Lyrics	Music	Length
11.	"Murder by Numbers"	Sting	Summers	4:31

=== Additional tracks ===
Additional songs recorded during the Synchronicity sessions can be found on other releases:

Title	Source
"Murder by Numbers"	"Every Breath You Take"
"Truth Hits Everybody" (Remix)	"Every Breath You Take" (UK) "Synchronicity II" (Europe)
"Someone to Talk To"	"Wrapped Around Your Finger" (UK) "King of Pain" (US) "Synchronicity I" (JP)
"Once Upon a Daydream"	"Synchronicity II"

== Personnel ==
Adapted from the album's liner notes and Richard Buskin.

=== The Police ===
- Sting – lead vocals (1–3, 5–11), backing vocals, bass, electric upright bass, piano, synthesizers, sequencer (1, 2), pan flute (2), oboe (10)
- Andy Summers – guitar, guitar synthesizer, lead vocals (4)
- Stewart Copeland – drums, percussion

=== Technical ===
- Produced by Hugh Padgham and The Police
- Engineered by Hugh Padgham
- Assistant engineers (uncredited) – Renate Blauel (at AIR) and Robbie Whelan (at Le Studio)
- Mastered by Bob Ludwig
- Art direction and design – Jeff Ayeroff with Norman Moore
- Photography – Duane Michals

== Charts ==
=== Weekly charts ===
1983–1984 weekly chart performance for Synchronicity
Chart (1983–1984)	Peak position
Australian Albums (Kent Music Report)	1
Austrian Albums (Ö3 Austria)	11
Canada Top Albums/CDs (RPM)	1
Dutch Albums (Album Top 100)	2
German Albums (Offizielle Top 100)	4
Italian Albums (Musica e dischi)	1
Japanese Albums (Oricon)	17
New Zealand Albums (RMNZ)	1
Norwegian Albums (VG-lista)	3
Spanish Albums (AFYVE)	1
Swedish Albums (Sverigetopplistan)	4
Swiss Albums (Schweizer Hitparade)	15
UK Albums (Official Charts)	1
US Billboard 200	1

2024 weekly chart performance for Synchronicity
Chart (2024)	Peak position
Belgian Albums (Ultratop Flanders)	38
Belgian Albums (Ultratop Wallonia)	23
German Albums (Offizielle Top 100)	3
Polish Albums (ZPAV)	61

=== Year-end charts ===
Chart (1983)	Position
Australian Albums (Kent Music Report)	9
Canada Top Albums/CDs (RPM)	3
Dutch Albums (Album Top 100)	23
New Zealand Albums (RMNZ)	8
UK Albums (Gallup)	11
US Billboard 200	3

Chart (1984)	Position
Australian Albums (Kent Music Report)	52
Canada Top Albums/CDs (RPM)	26
New Zealand Albums (RMNZ)	43
US Billboard 200	8

== Certifications and sales ==
Region	Certification	Certified units/sales
Brazil (Pro-Música Brasil) (Super Deluxe Edition)	Gold	20,000^{‡}
Canada (Music Canada)	Platinum	800,000
Denmark (IFPI Danmark)	Gold	10,000^{‡}
France (SNEP)	Platinum	400,000^{*}
Germany (BVMI)	Gold	250,000^{^}
Hong Kong (IFPI Hong Kong)	Gold	10,000^{*}
Italy (AFI)	Platinum	500,000
Italy (FIMI) Sales since 2009	Gold	25,000^{‡}
Japan	—	175,000
Netherlands (NVPI)	Gold	50,000^{^}
New Zealand (RMNZ)	Platinum	15,000^{^}
United Kingdom (BPI)	Platinum	300,000^{^}
United States (RIAA)	8× Platinum	8,500,000
Yugoslavia	—	85,000
Summaries
Worldwide	—	15,000,000
^{*} Sales figures based on certification alone.^{^} Shipments figures based on certification alone.^{‡} Sales+streaming figures based on certification alone.
