= Jim: The James Foley Story =

- Theatrical release poster
- Directed by: Brian Oakes
- Written by: Chris Chuang; Heather MacDonald; Brian Oakes
- Produced by: George Kunhardt; Teddy Kunhardt; Eva Lipman
- Cinematography: Rachel Beth Anderson; James Foley; Clair Popkin; Matthew VanDyke
- Edited by: Aleks Gezentsvey
- Music by: Osei Essed; Saul Simon MacWilliams; Dan Romer
- Distributed by: HBO Documentary Films
- Release dates: January 23, 2016 (Sundance Film Festival); February 6, 2016 (United States)
- Running time: 111 minutes
- Country: United States
- Language: English

Jim: The James Foley Story is a 2016 American documentary film about the life of war correspondent James "Jim" Foley, directed by Brian Oakes. It premiered at the Sundance Film Festival on January 23, 2016, and on HBO on February 6, 2016.

== Synopsis ==
Directed by Foley's childhood friend Brian Oakes, the film chronicles the life of American photojournalist James "Jim" Foley. On Thanksgiving Day 2012, Foley was kidnapped in Syria while reporting on the Syrian Civil War and went missing for two years. The infamous video of his beheading in August 2014, purportedly as a response to American airstrikes in Iraq, introduced much of the world to the Islamic State of Iraq (ISIS). Interviews with family, friends, journalist colleagues, and fellow hostages provide insight into Foley's character, work, captivity and legacy.

== Reception ==
As of January 2017, this film has a rating of 91% on Rotten Tomatoes, based on 22 reviews and an average score of 6.9/10. It also has a score of 73 out of 100 on Metacritic, based on 8 critics, indicating "generally favorable" reviews. The film won the Primetime Emmy Award for Exceptional Merit in Documentary Filmmaking and Audience Award: Documentary at the 2016 Sundance Film Festival.

== Music ==
The film received an Academy Award nomination for Best Original Song for the song "The Empty Chair", written by J. Ralph and Sting and performed by Sting.
