= Ghost in the Machine Tour =

1981–1982 concert tour by the Police

- Tour by the Police
- Official Program
- Associated album: Ghost in the Machine
- Start date: 1 October 1981
- End date: 6 September 1982
- Legs: 6
- No. of shows: 28 in Europe; 68 in North America; 4 in South America; 100 total

the Police concert chronology
- Zenyatta Mondatta Tour (1980–1981); Ghost in the Machine Tour (1981–1982); Synchronicity Tour (1983–1984)

The Ghost in the Machine Tour was a concert tour by the Police to promote their album Ghost in the Machine. To reflect the horns-based sound that permeated the album, the band decided to work with back-up musicians, hiring a horn section called The Chops (Darryl Dixon, David Watson and Marvin Daniels), who previously worked on the Sugarhill label.

The opening act for the North America II portion was Bow Wow Wow or Oingo Boingo or the Go-Go's and Joan Jett and the Blackhearts. For the North America III portion (Portland, Maine), the opening act was Black Uhuru. The English Beat was the opening act for the North America IV portion of the tour. A Flock of Seagulls opened in Norfolk, Virginia. Jools Holland and his Millionaires opened during the UK dates of the tour.

The Toronto appearance on 13 August 1982 was the second annual "Police Picnic" festival, with the band headlining. Opening acts included Oingo Boingo, the Spoons, A Flock of Seagulls, the English Beat, Joan Jett and the Blackhearts, and Talking Heads. During the Police set, Ranking Roger of the English Beat joined them on "One World (Not Three)".

== Setlist ==
This setlist was obtained from the 20 March 1982 concert; held at The Summit in Houston, Texas. It does not represent all concerts for the duration of the tour.

1. "Voices Inside My Head"
2. "Message in a Bottle"
3. "Every Little Thing She Does Is Magic"
4. "Spirits in the Material World"
5. "Hungry for You (J'aurais toujours faim de toi)"
6. "When the World Is Running Down, You Make the Best of What's Still Around"
7. "The Bed's Too Big Without You"
8. "De Do Do Do, De Da Da Da"
9. "Demolition Man"
10. "Shadows in the Rain"
11. "Walking on the Moon"
12. "Invisible Sun"
13. "Bring on the Night"
14. "One World (Not Three)"
15. "Roxanne"
16. "Don't Stand So Close to Me"
17. "Can't Stand Losing You" / "Reggatta De Blanc" / "Be My Girl—Sally"
18. "So Lonely"

== Personnel ==
- Sting – bass, double bass, synthesiser, lead vocals
- Andy Summers – guitar, synthesiser, backing vocals
- Stewart Copeland – drums, percussion, backing vocals
- Darryl Dixon – baritone sax
- David Watson – alto sax
- Marvin Daniels – trumpet
- Bono – vocals on "Invisible Sun" (British leg of the tour)

== Tour dates ==
List of tour dates, showing date, city, country, venue, attendance, gross
Date	City	Country	Venue	Attendance	Gross
Europe
1 October 1981	Böblingen	West Germany	Sporthalle	N/A	
2 October 1981	Essen	West Germany	Grugahalle	N/A	
3 October 1981	Kassel	West Germany	Eissporthalle Kassel	N/A	
5 October 1981	Freiburg	West Germany	Stadthalle Freiburg	N/A	
6 October 1981	Rüsselsheim	West Germany	Walter-Köbel-Halle	N/A	
8 October 1981	Eppelheim	West Germany	Rhein-Neckar-Halle	N/A	
9 October 1981	Munich	West Germany	Olympiahalle	N/A	
12 December 1981	London	England	Marquee Club	N/A	
14 December 1981	London	England	Wembley Arena	N/A	
15 December 1981	London	England	Wembley Arena	N/A	
16 December 1981	London	England	Wembley Arena	N/A	
18 December 1981	Brighton	England	Brighton Centre	N/A	
19 December 1981	Birmingham	England	Birmingham International Arena	N/A	
21 December 1981	Queensferry	Wales	Deeside Leisure Centre	N/A	
22 December 1981	Leeds	England	Queens Hall	N/A	
23 December 1981	Stafford	England	Bingley Hall	N/A	
31 December 1981	Edinburgh	Scotland	Royal Highland Exhibition Hall	N/A	
3 January 1982	Stockholm	Sweden	Johanneshovs Isstadion	N/A	
4 January 1982	Gothenburg	Sweden	Scandinavium	N/A	
5 January 1982	Copenhagen	Denmark	Brøndby Hall	N/A	
7 January 1982	Hamburg	West Germany	Ernst-Merck-Halle	N/A	
9 January 1982	Leiden	Netherlands	Groenoordhallen	N/A	
10 January 1982	Paris	France	Parc des expositions de Paris-Le Bourget	N/A	
11 January 1982	Paris	France	Parc des expositions de Paris-Le Bourget	N/A	
North America
15 January 1982	Boston	United States	Boston Garden	15,500 / 15,500	$173,613
16 January 1982	Landover	United States	Capital Centre	N/A	
18 January 1982	Philadelphia	United States	The Spectrum	18,661 / 18,661	$173,088
19 January 1982	Uniondale	United States	Nassau Veterans Memorial Coliseum	16,784 / 16,784	$197,895
20 January 1982	Springfield	United States	Springfield Civic Center	9,050 / 9,050	$95,207
22 January 1982	New York City	United States	Madison Square Garden	N/A	
23 January 1982	New Haven	United States	New Haven Veterans Memorial Coliseum	10,563 / 10,563	$117,253
25 January 1982	Williamsburg	United States	William & Mary Hall	N/A	
26 January 1982	Greensboro	United States	Greensboro Coliseum	13,730 / 13,730	$141,555
27 January 1982	Atlanta	United States	Omni Coliseum	N/A	
29 January 1982	Richfield Township	United States	Richfield Coliseum	N/A	
30 January 1982	Detroit	United States	Cobo Arena	12,191 / 12,191	$134,507
1 February 1982	Rosemont	United States	Rosemont Horizon	N/A	
2 February 1982	Minneapolis	United States	Metropolitan Sports Center	N/A	
4 February 1982	Denver	United States	McNichols Sports Arena	N/A	
6 February 1982	Phoenix	United States	Compton Terrace	N/A	
8 February 1982	Inglewood	United States	The Forum	47,889 / 47,889	$518,357
9 February 1982	Inglewood	United States	The Forum	47,889 / 47,889	$518,357
10 February 1982	Inglewood	United States	The Forum	47,889 / 47,889	$518,357
12 February 1982	Daly City	United States	Cow Palace	29,000 / 29,000	$304,640
13 February 1982	Daly City	United States	Cow Palace	29,000 / 29,000	$304,640
South America
16 February 1982	Rio de Janeiro	Brazil	Ginásio do Maracanãzinho	N/A	
17 February 1982	Rio de Janeiro	Brazil	Ginásio do Maracanãzinho	N/A	
19 February 1982 (Note: The performances on 19 and 20 February, 1982, were part of the Viña del Mar International Song Festival.)	Viña del Mar	Chile	Anfiteatro de la Quinta Vergara	N/A	
20 February 1982	Viña del Mar	Chile	Anfiteatro de la Quinta Vergara	N/A	
North America
12 March 1982	Pembroke Pines	United States	Hollywood Sportatorium	15,000 / 15,000	$151,180
13 March 1982	Jacksonville	United States	Jacksonville Veterans Memorial Coliseum	11,602 / 11,602	$116,930
14 March 1982	Lakeland	United States	Lakeland Civic Center	N/A	
16 March 1982	Birmingham	United States	BJCC Coliseum	12,561 / 12,561	$117,960
17 March 1982	Memphis	United States	Mid-South Coliseum	11,685 / 11,685	$117,668
19 March 1982	Baton Rouge	United States	Riverside Centroplex Arena	N/A	
20 March 1982	Houston	United States	The Summit	N/A	
22 March 1982	Austin	United States	Frank Erwin Center	17,343 / 17,343	$184,202
23 March 1982	Dallas	United States	Reunion Arena	18,017 / 19,000	$216,627
25 March 1982	Kansas City	United States	Kemper Arena	15,289 / 15,289	$161,701
26 March 1982	Norman	United States	Lloyd Noble Center	N/A	
28 March 1982	Rosemont	United States	Rosemont Horizon	18,090 / 18,090	$199,285
29 March 1982	Indianapolis	United States	Market Square Arena	12,298 / 14,500	$126,640
31 March 1982	Champaign	United States	Assembly Hall	N/A	
1 April 1982	St. Louis	United States	Checkerdome	19,715 / 19,715	$193,960
3 April 1982	Charlotte	United States	Charlotte Coliseum	N/A	
4 April 1982	Lexington	United States	Rupp Arena	13,685 / 13,685	$141,481
6 April 1982	Cincinnati	United States	Riverfront Coliseum	N/A	
7 April 1982	Ann Arbor	United States	Crisler Arena	13,575 / 13,575	$149,477
9 April 1982	Pittsburgh	United States	Civic Arena	14,770 / 16,000	$173,547
10 April 1982	Hartford	United States	Hartford Civic Center	16,066 / 16,066	$176,094
12 April 1982	Boston	United States	Boston Garden	15,500 / 15,500	$173,754
13 April 1982	Providence	United States	Providence Civic Center	13,300 / 13,300	$147,811
15 April 1982	Portland	United States	Cumberland County Civic Center	9,384 / 9,384	$107,974
16 April 1982	Syracuse	United States	Carrier Dome	32,396 / 32,396	$320,970
18 April 1982	East Rutherford	United States	Brendan Byrne Arena	41,334 / 41,334	$525,492
19 April 1982	East Rutherford	United States	Brendan Byrne Arena	41,334 / 41,334	$525,492
21 April 1982	East Rutherford	United States	Brendan Byrne Arena		
22 April 1982	Uniondale	United States	Nassau Veterans Memorial Coliseum	17,049 / 17,049	$218,958
Europe
2 July 1982	Bologna	Italy	Quartiere Fieristico di Bologna	N/A	
4 July 1982	Segrate	Italy	Parco Laghetto di Redecesio	N/A	
28 July 1982	Aylesbury	England	Friars Aylesbury	N/A	
29 July 1982	Southampton	England	Gaumont Theatre	N/A	
31 July 1982	Gateshead	England	Gateshead International Stadium	N/A	
North America
9 August 1982	Norfolk	United States	Scope Auditorium	13,000 / 13,000	$161,000
11 August 1982	Montreal	Canada	Percival Molson Memorial Stadium	23,686 / 25,000	$367,133
13 August 1982	Toronto	Canada	CNE Grandstand	38,824 / 50,000	$776,480
15 August 1982	Charlevoix	United States	Castle Farms Music Theatre	13,880 / 15,000	$187,761
17 August 1982	Nashville	United States	Nashville Municipal Auditorium	7,577 / 9,900	$90,291
18 August 1982	Peoria	United States	Peoria Civic Center	N/A	
20 August 1982	East Troy	United States	Alpine Valley Music Theatre	N/A	
21 August 1982	Cedar Rapids	United States	Five Seasons Center	N/A	
23 August 1982	Morrison	United States	Red Rocks Amphitheatre	N/A	
24 August 1982	Omaha	United States	Rosenblatt Stadium	N/A	
26 August 1982	Salt Lake City	United States	Salt Palace	N/A	
28 August 1982	Sacramento	United States	Cal Expo Amphitheatre	24,583 / 25,000	$372,144
29 August 1982	Portland	United States	Portland Memorial Coliseum	10,180 / 11,000	$127,250
31 August 1982	Vancouver	Canada	Pacific Coliseum	15,332 / 16,811	$213,793
1 September 1982	Seattle	United States	Seattle Center Coliseum	N/A	
3 September 1982	San Bernardino	United States	Glen Helen Pavilion	N/A	
5 September 1982	Tucson	United States	TCC Arena	8,795 / 8,795	$101,142
6 September 1982	Las Cruces	United States	Pan American Center	N/A	

== Sources ==
- The Police – Ghost In The Machine Tour – 1981 / 1982
