= J. Ralph =

American singer-songwriter

- Born: 1975 (age 50–51); New York City, U.S.
- Occupations: Composer; singer-songwriter; producer; engineer; mixer; arranger
- Instruments: Vocals; guitar; synthesizer; drums; bass guitar
- Years active: 1997–present
- Labels: Lava; Atlantic; Universal; Rumor Mill
- Website: www.jralph.com

Josh Ralph (born 1975), known professionally as J. Ralph, is an American composer, producer, singer/songwriter and social activist who focuses on creating awareness and change through music and film.

A three-time Academy Award-nominated composer, Ralph's professional career began when he was signed to Atlantic Records at age 22 as a recording artist. He is the founder of a music production company The Rumor Mill, and has written and produced the music for Grammy Award-winning artists, symphony orchestras, the United Nations, and former United States President Barack Obama. His music has sold more than 10 million records worldwide reaching the number one position on the Billboard charts in over 22 countries.

== Music career ==
Honored by the Smithsonian National Museum of American History for innovative and unique contributions to American music, Ralph is completely self-taught and does not read or write a single note of music. He is the founder of production company The Rumor Mill. His songs have been featured in commercial advertisements for Porsche, Nike, Volkswagen, Volvo, and Chrysler.

Ralph has recorded two CDs, The Illusionary Movements of Geraldine and Nazu (2005) and Music to Mauzner By (1999), the latter under the moniker "Spy". He has also written for live performance, with 2008's "Fanfare for the Uncommon Ellie and Mr. Greene" performed by the ProMusica Chamber Orchestra of Columbus.

Described by The Hollywood Reporter as the "go-to producer of documentary film scores, and by Indiewire as “Perhaps the best documentary composer working today”,Ralph has scored numerous documentary films addressing social and political subjects. John Troutman has written that Ralph and his collaborators have "spurned governments to act and introduced or amplified for millions of people, concerns that might otherwise fallen under the radar." Over the last decade, Ralph has written and produced the music for eight Oscar-winning/nominated documentary feature films including Man on Wire (2009), The Cove (2010), Hell and Back Again (2012), Chasing Ice (2013), Finding Vivian Maier (2015), Virunga (2015), Racing Extinction (2016) and Jim: The James Foley Story (2017).

For his contribution to Chasing Ice, Ralph received an Oscar nomination for his song "Before My Time", performed by Scarlett Johansson and Joshua Bell. He received his second Oscar nomination for his song "Manta Ray" co-written and performed by Anohni. For his contribution to Jim: The James Foley Story, Ralph received his third Oscar nomination for "The Empty Chair", which he co-wrote and performed with Sting.

Ralph is the first composer in the history of the Oscars to have received multiple nominations for Best Original song that originated from documentaries. Additionally, Ralph is the first composer in Academy Award's history to write and produce the original music for multiple Oscar-nominated documentary films in the same year and the first composer to have back to back nominations for best song in a documentary.

On February 22, 2014, Ralph and the Boulder Philharmonic Orchestra in Colorado performed several of his works. including "Before My Time", which Ralph sang.

On August 1, 2015, Ralph created the music for the Projecting Change art installation event on the Empire State Building in New York City to raise awareness for species extinction. The songs included "One Candle", written and performed by Ralph and Sia, and "Manta Ray" performed by Ralph and Anohni.

For Virunga, Ralph wrote and produced the song "We Will Not Go", performed by Youssou Ndour, Salif Keita, and Fally Ipupa. Ralph recorded this song in Bambara, Lingala, Wolof, French and English.

Ralph was commissioned by Discovery Channel to write an original symphonic piece for Shark Week 2015 called "Theodora". The object was to raise awareness and money for species extinction, oceanic preservation, and sharks. Featuring violinist Joshua Bell, the London Symphony Orchestra and London Voices, the piece was recorded at Abbey Road studios in London.

== Collaborations ==
Ralph has written and produced songs in collaboration with a wide variety of artists, including Sting, Sia, Wynton Marsalis, Method Man, Wu-Tang Clan, Liza Minnelli, Willie Nelson, Anohni (of Antony and the Johnsons), Joshua Bell, Karen O (of the Yeah Yeah Yeah's), Ezra Koneig (of Vampire Weekend), The London Symphony Orchestra, The London Voices, The PS22 Chorus, Youssou Ndour, Salif Keita, Fally Ipupa, Sean Lennon, Philippe Petit, Dr. John, Devendra Banhart, Stephen Stills, Carly Simon, Vincent Gallo, David Garza, Ben Harper, Scarlett Johansson, Bob Weir (of the Grateful Dead), Aston "Family Man" Barrett (of Bob Marley & The Wailers), Matisyahu, KRS-One, Paul Brady, Bonnie Bramlett, Vashti Bunyan, Martin Carthy, Judy Collins, Lila Downs, Nic Jones, Norah Jones, Leah Siegel and Ben Taylor.

== Filmography as composer ==
- 2006 - Lucky Number Slevin
- 2007 - Black White + Gray: A Portrait of Sam Wagstaff and Robert Mapplethorpe
- 2008 - Man on Wire (Academy Award winner: Best Documentary)
- 2009 - The Cove (Academy Award winner: Best Documentary)
- 2010 - Jean-Michel Basquiat: The Radiant Child
- 2011 - Hell and Back Again (Academy Award nominated:Best Documentary)
- 2011 - Wretches & Jabberers
- 2011 - Deepest Dive: the Story of the Trieste
- 2012 - Maladies (Berlin Film Festival)
- 2012 - Chasing Ice (Academy Award nominated: Best Original Song. "Before My Time")
- 2012 - Turned Towards the Sun (London Film Festival)
- 2013 - Finding Vivian Maier (Academy Award nominated: Best Documentary)
- 2014 - Garnet's Gold
- 2014 - Virunga (Academy Award Nominated: Best Documentary)
- 2014 - Meru (Sundance Film Festival World Premiere: Winner of Sundance Audience Award)
- 2015 - Racing Extinction (Sundance Film Festival World Premiere) (Academy Award nominated: Best Original Song, "Manta Ray")
- 2015 - Jim: The James Foley Story (Academy Award Nominated: Best Original Song. "The Empty Chair")
- 2018 - Weightless
- 2019 - Wu-Tang Clan: Of Mics and Men (Emmy nomination For Best Writing)
- 2019 - Fine Lines
- 2022 - The Voice of Dust and Ash (Academy Award Short List: Best Original Song "Dust & Ash")
