= Spirits in the Material World =

Single by the Police

from the album Ghost in the Machine
- B-side: "Low Life" (UK); "Flexible Strategies" (US)
- Released: 4 December 1981
- Recorded: 1981
- Genre: New wave; avant-pop; ska; reggae
- Length: 2:58
- Label: A&M – AMS 8194
- Songwriter: Sting
- Producers: Hugh Padgham; Stewart Copeland; Sting; Andy Summers

The Police singles chronology
"Every Little Thing She Does Is Magic" (1981)	"Spirits in the Material World" (1981)	"Secret Journey" (1982)

Alternative cover
- US 7-inch single cover

Music video
- "Spirits in the Material World" on YouTube

"Spirits in the Material World" is a song by the British rock trio the Police, written by Sting. The opening track for their 1981 album Ghost in the Machine, it was released as a single in 1981 and reached No. 12 in the United Kingdom and No. 11 in the US in early 1982.

== Background ==
"Spirits in the Material World" was written by Sting on a Casiotone keyboard while in a truck. It was his first experience using a synthesizer.

'Spirits in the Material World' was written on one of those Casio keyboards while I was riding in the back of a truck somewhere. I just tap, tap, tap and there it was, just by accident. That was the first time I'd ever touched a synthesizer, that album.

— Sting, Synchronicity Tour Program, 1983

Andy Summers' presence on the studio track is considerably less pronounced than on the vast majority of Police songs, and in fact, Sting wanted to record it without him entirely. Having written the song on a synthesizer, he wanted to use synthesizer instead of guitar, and to play the synthesizer part himself. Summers thought the synthesizer part should be replaced by guitar. After considerable argument, they compromised by recording the part on both instruments, with a mix such that the synthesizer drowned out much of Summers's guitar.

In live performances, this part was played on guitar only, with synthesizer used for background chords. The bass part is distinctively complex, with music producer and cognitive psychologist Daniel Levitin writing that it "takes this rhythmic play to such an extreme that it can be hard to tell where the downbeat even is." In 2023 Stewart Copeland said that this was the hardest Police song for him as a drummer: "It's my personal bête noire ... because there's no 1 [beat]. It's all upbeat."

The track was recorded at Air Studios Montserrat.

The lyrics comment on the nature of man's existence and the failure of his earthly institutions.

"Spirits in the Material World" eventually saw single release in 1981 as the follow-up to "Every Little Thing She Does Is Magic", making it the third single from Ghost in the Machine in Britain and the second in America. Billboard called it "less mainstream yet more captivating" than "Every Little Thing She Does Is Magic" and said that "the repetitive rhythm creates a hypnotic effect." Record World also compared it to "Every Little Thing She Does Is Magic," saying that it "[takes] reggae one step further into the pop world" and calling it a "hypnotic cut." The single, while not as successful as its predecessors, peaked at No. 12 in Britain and No. 11 in America. It was followed up by "Secret Journey" in America.

The UK B-side of "Spirits in the Material World", "Low Life", was written by Sting around 1977 in the back of a German tour bus. Although Copeland claimed to have "always loved the song," Summers claimed that "Neither Stewart or I liked 'Low Life.' I thought the lyric was snobby and it had a kind of corny jazziness to it." The American B-side, an instrumental titled "Flexible Strategies", was recorded in Canada while the band was working on Ghost in the Machine. Word came that the record company wanted them to create a B-side, and the band jammed for ten minutes, resulting in this track. Copeland called this recording "a disgrace".

=== Live performances ===
The band performed the song live during the Ghost in the Machine and Synchronicity tours (the latter of which was included on their Live! album) and it was also included on their first North American setlist during their reunion tour. Since the dissolution of the Police, Sting has often performed the song on solo tours.

In all live performances, the song is played in the key of D minor in contrast to the studio version's A minor. In most cases, Sting plays a more simplified version of the original bassline to play while singing.

== Personnel ==
- Sting – lead and backing vocals, bass guitar, synthesizer, saxophone
- Andy Summers – guitar, Prophet-5 synthesizer
- Stewart Copeland – drums
- Olaf Kubler – saxophone on "Low Life"

== Track listings ==
=== 7-inch: A&M / AMS 8194 (UK) ===
1. "Spirits in the Material World" – 2:59
2. "Low Life" – 3:45

=== 7-inch: A&M / AM 2390 (US) ===
1. "Spirits in the Material World" – 3:01
2. "Flexible Strategies" – 3:44

== Charts ==
Chart (1981–1982)	Peak position
Australia (Kent Music Report)	50
Belgium (Ultratop 50 Flanders)	8
Canada Top Singles (RPM)	13
French Singles Chart	4
Ireland (IRMA)	6
Netherlands (Single Top 100)	8
UK Singles (Official Charts)	12
US Billboard Hot 100	11
US Cashbox	15
US Mainstream Rock Airplay (Billboard)	7
West Germany (GfK)	44

== Cover versions ==
- In 1990, reggae artist Pato Banton covered the song for his fifth album Wize Up! (No Compromize). It was re-recorded in 1995 for the soundtrack to Ace Ventura: When Nature Calls. Sting is featured in this version. The song entered the UK charts at number 36 in January 1996 and stayed there for two weeks. This version is also featured on the covers album Reggatta Mondatta: A Reggae Tribute to the Police (1997).
