= The Empty Chair (song) =

Single by Sting

from the album Jim: The James Foley Story and 57th & 9th
- Released: 23 December 2016
- Genre: Classical
- Length: 3:17
- Label: The Rumor Mill; UMG
- Songwriters: J. Ralph; Sting
- Producers: Arthur Pingrey; J. Ralph

Audio
- "The Empty Chair" on YouTube

"The Empty Chair" is a song recorded by English singer-songwriter Sting. Co-written by Sting and American record producer J. Ralph, the song was released as the lead single from the soundtrack album of the 2016 documentary film Jim: The James Foley Story.

"The Empty Chair" was nominated for the 2017 Academy Award in the Best Original Song category. Both Sting and J. Ralph have previously received nominations in the same category; Sting was nominated three times before while J. Ralph had two previous nominations.

Sting recorded a separate version of the song with a guitar, instead of piano, for his studio album 57th & 9th.

== Inspiration ==
The song is written for the film Jim: The James Foley Story which tells the life story of American photojournalist James "Jim" Foley who was kidnapped in Syria and subsequently beheaded by Islamic State of Iraq and the Levant (ISIS). Sting, who wrote the song with J. Ralph, discussed the inspiration behind "The Empty Chair" during an interview with Billboard:

The stakes are higher when you're writing about a person who really existed, a person with family and friends you want to honor. I'm glad I found the metaphor of the empty chair. I said no at first [when Ralph asked]. I said 'This is beyond my powers.' I curated the song from what [Jim's] family and friends said about him. It's their song.

== Live performances ==
Sting performed a solo acoustic guitar version of "The Empty Chair" during the 89th Academy Awards ceremony aired live on 26 February 2017. Sting also sang the song in November 2016 at Bataclan, a theatre in Paris, in an exclusive concert to commemorate the 2015 terrorist attack.
