= I Can't Stop Thinking About You =

Single by Sting

from the album 57th & 9th
- Released: 1 September 2016
- Recorded: May 2016
- Genre: Rock
- Length: 3:37
- Label: A&M
- Songwriter: Sting
- Producer: Martin Kierszenbaum

Sting singles chronology
"And Yet" (2013)	"I Can't Stop Thinking About You" (2016)	"50,000" (2016)

Music video
- "Sting - I Can't Stop Thinking About You" on YouTube

"I Can't Stop Thinking About You" is a song by English singer-songwriter Sting from his twelfth studio album, 57th & 9th. It was released as the album's lead single on 1 September 2016. The song peaked at number two on Billboard's Adult Alternative Songs chart in the United States, becoming Sting's first hit on the chart since 2004's "Stolen Car (Take Me Dancing)", which reached number 14.

== Promotion ==
Sting debuted the studio version of "I Can't Stop Thinking About You" – and performed the song live – on 31 August 2016 in the Red Bull Sound Space at L.A. radio station KROQ.

On 27 October 2016, Sting released an acoustic version of "I Can't Stop Thinking About You" on Youtube.

== Personnel ==
- Sting – vocals, bass guitar
- Dominic Miller – guitars
- Martin Kierszenbaum – organ
- Vinnie Colaiuta – drums
- Rhani Krija – percussion
- The Last Bandoleros (Jerry Fuentes, Derek James and Diego Navaira) – backing vocals

== Charts ==
Chart (2016–17)	Peak position
Belgium (Ultratip Bubbling Under Flanders)	27
Belgium (Ultratip Bubbling Under Wallonia)	8
France (SNEP)	52
Japan Hot 100 (Billboard)	59
Poland (Polish Airplay Top 100)	17
Slovenia (SloTop50)	26
US Adult Alternative Airplay (Billboard)	2
US Adult Pop Airplay (Billboard)	37
US Hot Rock & Alternative Songs (Billboard)	35
US Rock & Alternative Airplay (Billboard)	40

== Release history ==
Country	Date	Format	Label
Worldwide	1 September 2016	Digital download	A&M Records
United States	7 November 2016	Adult contemporary radio	A&M Records
