= Synchronicity II =

Single by the Police

from the album Synchronicity
- B-side: "Once Upon a Daydream"
- Released: 28 October 1983
- Recorded: Late 1982; January 1983
- Studio: AIR Montserrat, Salem, Montserrat (basic tracks); Le Studio, Morin-Heights, Quebec (overdubs and mixing)
- Genre: Rock
- Length: 5:04
- Label: A&M (AM 153)
- Songwriter: Sting
- Producers: The Police; Hugh Padgham

The Police UK singles chronology
"Wrapped Around Your Finger" (1983)	"Synchronicity II" (1983)	"King of Pain" (1984)

The Police US singles chronology
"King of Pain" (1983)	"Synchronicity II" (1983)	"Wrapped Around Your Finger" (1984)

Alternative cover
- Brazilian single picture sleeve

Music video
- "Synchronicity II" on YouTube

"Synchronicity II" is a song by the Police, and the third single from their album Synchronicity. Written by lead singer and bassist Sting, it was released as a single in the UK and the US by A&M Records, reaching No. 17 on the UK Singles Chart and No. 16 on the Billboard Hot 100 in December 1983. It features the non-album track "Once Upon a Daydream" on the B-side. The song was described by People Weekly as "aggressive" and "steely."

== Background ==
The song, which refers to Carl Jung's theory of synchronicity, nominally tells the story of a man whose home, work life, and environment are dispiriting and depressing. Lyrics refer to "grandmother screaming at the wall", as well as "mother chants her litany of boredom and frustration / but we know all her suicides are fake". The man is routinely denigrated by his boss ("and every single meeting with his so-called superior / Is a humiliating kick in the crotch") and ignored when he crosses a picket line; all the while "he knows that something somewhere has to break". Meanwhile, something monstrous is emerging from a "dark Scottish lake/loch", a reference to the Loch Ness Monster—a parallel to the father's own inner anguish.

There's a domestic situation where there's a man who's on the edge of paranoia, and as his paranoia increases a monster takes shape in a Scottish lake, the monster being a symbol of the man's anxiety. That's a synchronistic situation.

— Sting, 'A Visual Documentary', 1984

Interpretations of the lyrics vary widely. Writing in Entertainment Weekly about a 1996 Sting tour, Chris Willman said:

"The late-inning number that really gets [the crowd] galvanized is the edgy old Police staple that has the most old-fashioned unresolved rock tension in it, 'Synchronicity II'—which, after all, is a song about a domestic crisis so anxiety-producing that it wakes up the Loch Ness Monster."

Sting explained the theme of the song to Time magazine:

"Jung believed there was a large pattern to life, that it wasn't just chaos. Our song Synchronicity II is about two parallel events that aren't connected logically or causally, but symbolically."

"Synchronicity II" also may have taken inspiration from the poem "The Second Coming" by William Butler Yeats. The theme of "The Second Coming" is similar to that of "Synchronicity II"—a civilisation beginning to collapse, and the rise of something new, something perhaps savage, to take its place.

In the song, guitarist Andy Summers "forgoes the pretty clean sounds for post-apocalyptic squeals and crashing power chords", writes Matt Blackett in Guitar Player magazine. Summers recalls how the feedback was created: "So I was in the studio with the Strat and two Marshalls full up, waiting for them to run the track. I put the headphones on and started messing around with the feedback, really giving it one... six minutes of screeching with my life passing before me on the guitar!"

According to Summers, "Synchronicity II" was originally intended to be placed immediately after the song "Synchronicity I" on Synchronicity, with a brief instrumental piece serving as a segue.

"We had this section for 'Synchronicity' which we referred to as The Loch. I went in and detuned my guitar synth to C sharp and it produced a great wash of sound, lovely. And there was an acoustic on top, a few cymbals and an oboe, really serene. We were going to have it at the end of 'Synchronicity I' — it was supposed to be the Loch Ness Monster — and then it would go into 'Synchronicity II'. But we couldn't really get it to work. Miles (Copeland) didn't like it... it was too psychedelic for him."

The 2024 Super Deluxe box set of Synchronicity includes this piece under the title "Loch".

The flip side to the single, "Once Upon a Daydream", was a composition cowritten by Andy Summers and Sting. As Sting remembers, "It's a set of chords Andy came up with and I wrote some lyrics to them by the swimming pool in Monserrat. It's very dark but that was the Ghost in the Machine period. Very intense".

== Reception ==
Cash Box said the song "jumps with a contemporary rock drive" and praised Sting's vocal performance and Summers' and Copeland's "powerful" instrumental performances.

== Music video ==
The music video for "Synchronicity II" was directed by Godley & Creme, filmed at a sound stage on the outskirts of London. In it, the band are seen performing on top of giant piles of guitars, drums, junk, car parts and wires, with debris and papers flying about, interspersed with footage of Loch Ness at three points. The band members stood apart from each other on separate towers made of scaffolding, wearing dystopian-inspired outfits. A misty and stormy appearance was created with air blowers and dry ice. Andy Summers is seen playing a Gittler guitar. During filming, Copeland's tower caught fire and the crew started to leave the building. Creme told the director of photography to keep the cameras rolling despite the danger.

== Track listing ==
12" UK Single AMX 153
No.	Title	Length
1.	"Synchronicity II"	5:04
2.	"Once Upon a Daydream"	3:28

== Personnel ==
- Sting – bass, vocals
- Andy Summers – guitar, keyboards
- Stewart Copeland – drums

== Charts ==
Chart (1983–1984)	Peak position
Canada Top Singles (RPM)	21
Ireland (IRMA)	12
UK Singles (Official Charts)	17
US Cashbox	15
US Billboard Hot 100	16
US Mainstream Rock Airplay (Billboard)	9

== Cover versions ==
Brazilian power metal band Angra recorded a cover of "Synchronicity II" for their 2014 album Secret Garden.
