= King of Pain =

1983 single by the Police

- European 7-inch sleeve

Single by the Police

from the album Synchronicity
- B-side: "Tea in the Sahara" (live) (UK); "Someone to Talk To" (US)
- Released: August 1983 (US); 6 January 1984 (UK)
- Recorded: December 1982, January–February 1983
- Studio: AIR, Salem, Montserrat (basic tracks); Le Studio, Quebec, Canada (overdubs and mixing)
- Genre: New wave; pop rock
- Length: 5:00
- Label: A&M
- Songwriter: Sting
- Producers: The Police; Hugh Padgham

Police UK singles chronology
"Synchronicity II" (1983)	"King of Pain" (1983)	"Don't Stand So Close to Me '86" (1986)

Police US singles chronology
"Every Breath You Take" (1983)	"King of Pain" (1983)	"Synchronicity II" (1983)

Alternative covers
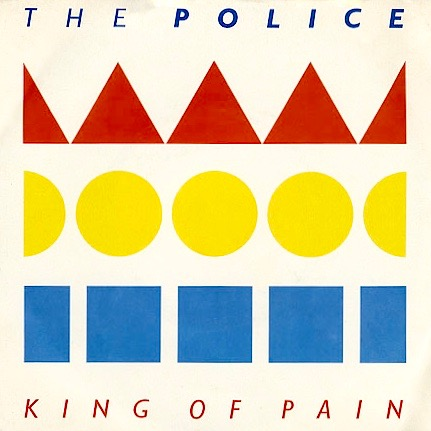
- North American 7-inch sleeve

Audio
- "King of Pain" on YouTube

"King of Pain" is a song by the British rock band the Police, released in August 1983 as the second single in the US from their fifth and final album Synchronicity (1983). Written by the band's lead singer and bassist Sting as a post-separation song from his wife, "King of Pain" conjures up symbols of pain and relates them to a man's soul.

A&M Records released "King of Pain" as the album's fourth single in the UK on 6 January 1984. In the United States, "King of Pain" was released in August 1983 as the second single from Synchronicity.

The song received acclaim from music critics, many of whom praised Sting's lyrics and cited the song as a highlight from Synchronicity. It reached No. 3 on the US Billboard Hot 100 chart in October 1983, and No. 1 on the Billboard Top Tracks chart for five weeks in August 1983. In the United Kingdom, it reached No. 17 in January 1984, becoming the band's last UK Top 20 hit.

Multiple artists have covered "King of Pain". Canadian singer-songwriter Alanis Morissette covered the track for her MTV Unplugged album (1999) and released it as the second single from the album.

== Background ==
Engineer/co-producer Hugh Padgham remembers this song as being one of several that had been heavily reformed and edited during the mixing stage. He explains:

I remember this one song on Synchronicity, called "King of Pain", which had basically everything going all the way through it. If you listen to it now, it's very stripped down, bits and pieces coming in here and there. Literally everything was recorded all the way through and I really remember that one well—sitting down with Sting coming in one day, when we were mixing and [Sting] going, "This is shit" and I went, "I think you're probably right." The thing at the back of my mind always is trying to keep things simple so you can then hear what's there, as opposed to the kitchen sink style, which is cool, sometimes. Some people do it incredibly well.

The multi-track recording bore little or no resemblance to the final mix that was included on the album. The introductory section with the piano and vocals was recorded separately on a different date and was edited into the main song.

== Composition and lyrics ==
"King of Pain" was written by Sting, while production was done by the Police and Hugh Padgham. The song was inspired by Sting's then-recent separation from his first wife, the split occurring after the birth of the second child. Sting wrote the song while in Jamaica staying at the former home of James Bond creator Ian Fleming. While in Jamaica, Sting also wrote "Every Breath You Take" and "Wrapped Around Your Finger". He remarked, "I conjured up symbols of pain and related them to my soul. A black spot on the sun struck me as being a very painful image, and I felt that was my soul up there on the sun. It's just projecting your state into the world of symbolism, which is what poetry's all about, really."

Actually, it was something I said. I'd just left my first wife – a very painful break – and I went to Jamaica to try and pull myself together. I was fortunate to be able to go to Jamaica, I have to say, and stayed at this nice house and was looking at the sun one day. I was with Trudie who is now my current wife and said 'Look, there's a little black spot on the sun today'. And there's a pause. I said, 'That's my soul up there'. I was full of hyperbole. I said that! I went back in and wrote it down on a piece of stuff, and wrote some other stuff.

— Sting, In The Studio Radio Show

Sting's fascination with Carl Jung and, to a greater extent, Arthur Koestler also inspired him to write the track. As a Hungarian-born novelist who resided in England, Koestler was enthralled with parapsychology and the unexplained workings of the mind (he wrote the book titled The Ghost in the Machine in the late '60s, after which the Police named their fourth album).

== Release ==
"King of Pain" was released as the second single in the US and the fourth single in the UK, taken from their fifth and final album, Synchronicity (1983). By August 1983, 75% of contemporary hit radio stations in the United States that reported to Radio & Records had included the song on their playlists. A music video was made but only released in Australia.

== Reception ==
=== Critical ===
The song was generally received favorably by music critics. Cashbox expressed their belief that "King of Pain" was not as immediately accessible as the single "Every Breath You Take", but nonetheless "grows in evocative power throughout its near five minutes."

Stephen Thomas Erlewine of Allmusic retrospectively picked the song as a highlight from the album, writing that "King of Pain" and "Wrapped Around Your Finger", "are devilishly infectious new wave singles." Sputnikmusic website picked it as an "essential track", writing that "King of Pain", "Every Breath You Take" and "Wrapped Around Your Finger", "rely on gorgeous, understated melodies, embracing the primary sonic overtones encompassing the record." Michael Roffman of Consequence of Sound chose the track as "one of his personal favorite Sting-led tracks," pairing it next to his other works like "If I Ever Lose My Faith in You" or "Fields of Gold". Ultimate Classic Rock critic Mike Duquette rated "King of Pain" as the Police's 5th best song, saying "that singsong piano hook, the melodic bass and a simple, effective solo by Summers make what could have been a pity party into a sterling pop/rock offering that not even "Weird Al" Yankovic could improve upon."

=== Commercial ===
The song was a success in the United States, peaking at No. 3 on the Billboard Hot 100 chart and No. 1 on the Mainstream Rock chart, while also reaching No. 47 on the Adult Contemporary chart. "King of Pain" entered Canada's RPM chart at No. 48, on the edition of 20 August 1983. The song climbed to No. 1 on the edition of 15 October 1983.

Elsewhere, the song performed modestly. In the United Kingdom, the song reached No. 17 one of the lowest charting-singles since their first single, "Fall Out" (1979). In Ireland, the song proved to be more successful, reaching No. 7, becoming their third top-ten single. In Belgium (Flanders) and Germany, the song became their lowest charting-single. Sting performed the song on his 1991 and 1993 tours.

== Track listing ==
7": A&M / AM 176 (UK)

1. "King of Pain" – 4:59
2. "Tea in the Sahara" (Live) – 5:05

7": A&M / AM-2569 (US)

1. "King of Pain" – 4:59
2. "Someone to Talk To" – 3:08

7": A&M / AMS 9722 (NL)

1. "King of Pain" – 4:59
2. "Once upon a Daydream" – 3:28

12": A&M / AMX 176 (UK)

1. "King of Pain" – 4:59
2. "Tea in the Sahara" (Live) – 5:05

== Personnel ==
- Sting – lead and backing vocals, bass guitar, piano, synthesizers
- Andy Summers – electric guitars
- Stewart Copeland – drums, marimba, percussion

== Charts ==
Chart (1983–1984)	Peak position
Australia (Kent Music Report)	44
Belgium (Ultratip Bubbling Under Flanders)	19
Canada Top Singles (RPM)	1
Ireland (IRMA)	7
UK Singles (OCC)	17
US Billboard Hot 100	3
US Adult Contemporary (Billboard)	47
US Mainstream Rock Airplay (Billboard)	1
US Cashbox	5
Venezuela (AP)	8
West Germany (GfK)	57

== Sales ==
Region	Certification	Certified units/sales
Canada	—	50,000

== Alanis Morissette version ==
"King of Pain"

Single by Alanis Morissette

from the album MTV Unplugged
- B-side: "Thank U (MTV Unplugged)"; "Baba (MTV Unplugged)"; "Your House (MTV Unplugged)"
- Released: 19 April 2000
- Recorded: 18 September 1999
- Venue: Brooklyn Academy of Music (Brooklyn, NY)
- Genre: Acoustic rock
- Length: 4:05
- Label: Maverick; Reprise
- Songwriter: Sting
- Producer: Alanis Morissette

Alanis Morissette singles chronology
"You Learn (MTV Unplugged)" (1999)	"King of Pain" (2000)	"Hands Clean" (2002)

Canadian singer-songwriter Alanis Morissette covered "King of Pain" for her MTV Unplugged album, on 18 September 1999. The song was released as the album's third and final single on 19 April 2000. Morissette shifted the word "king" to "queen" towards the end of the track. Critics gave the track favourable reviews, with some calling a "tender" ballad, and others naming it outstanding. The song only managed to chart in Brazil and Netherlands.

"King of Pain" was one of the songs Alanis selected to perform on her MTV Unplugged special on 18 September 1999. "King of Pain" was released as the second single from the album on 19 April 2000. The CD Single features "King of Pain" and three songs recorded for the Unplugged special, but not included on the album: "Thank U", "Baba" and "Your House".

=== Critical reception ===
Neva Chonin of Rolling Stone wrote that "songs with lusher orchestral backdrops – "You Oughta Know," "Uninvited" and the Police's "King of Pain" – still carry lengthy, vocalcentric intros." Beth Johnson of Entertainment Weekly called it " a tender cover". Chris Massey of PopMatters called it a "folksy cover which comes across exceedingly well." Massey commented that, "Sting's haunting vocals on the original song by The Police are almost overshadowed by the similarly chilling vocals of Alanis herself —almost. When the band kicks in – the bass is almost overpowering – and Alanis belts out the familiar chorus 'I have stood here before inside the pouring rain / With the world turning circles, running around my brain,' the power is outstanding."

=== Track listing ===
1. "King of Pain" (MTV Unplugged) – 4:05
2. Thank U (MTV Unplugged) – 4:11
3. Baba (MTV Unplugged) – 5:11
4. Your House (MTV Unplugged) – 4:37

=== Charts ===
Chart (2000)	Peak position
Brazil (Hot 100)	54
Netherlands (Dutch Top 40)	92

== Other cover versions ==
At the 2011 iHeart Radio Festival, Lady Gaga performed "King of Pain" as a duet with Sting. The performance was lauded by critics. Louis Virtel of The Backlot called it "the best version of the song you'll ever hear," praising Gaga for "sporting teal streaks and some Stevie Nicks drapery, and Sting is (of course) wearing Under Armour, basically. Excellent performance."

"Weird Al" Yankovic parodied the song as "King of Suede" in his 1984 album "Weird Al" Yankovic in 3-D.

== See also ==
- List of RPM number-one singles of 1983
- List of number-one mainstream rock hits (United States)
