= Sleeman (surname) =

Sleeman is an English surname. Notable people with the surname include:

- Anita Sleeman (1930–2011), married name of American-Canadian music composer Anita Andrés
- Colin Sleeman (1914–2006), British judge
- Derek H. Sleeman, British computing science professor emeritus
- Frank Sleeman (1915–2000), Australian politician
- Fred Sleeman (1885–1953), Australian rules footballer
- George Sleeman (1841–1926), Canadian brewer and politician
- John Herbert Sleeman (1880–1963), British classicist
- Joseph Sleeman (1885–1970), Australian politician
- Lance Sleeman (1885–1968), Australian rules footballer
- Thomas Sleeman (1813–1896), British archdeacon
- William Henry Sleeman (1788–1856), British colonial administrator

== See also ==
- Sleeman (disambiguation)
