= Alexis Grimou =

French painter

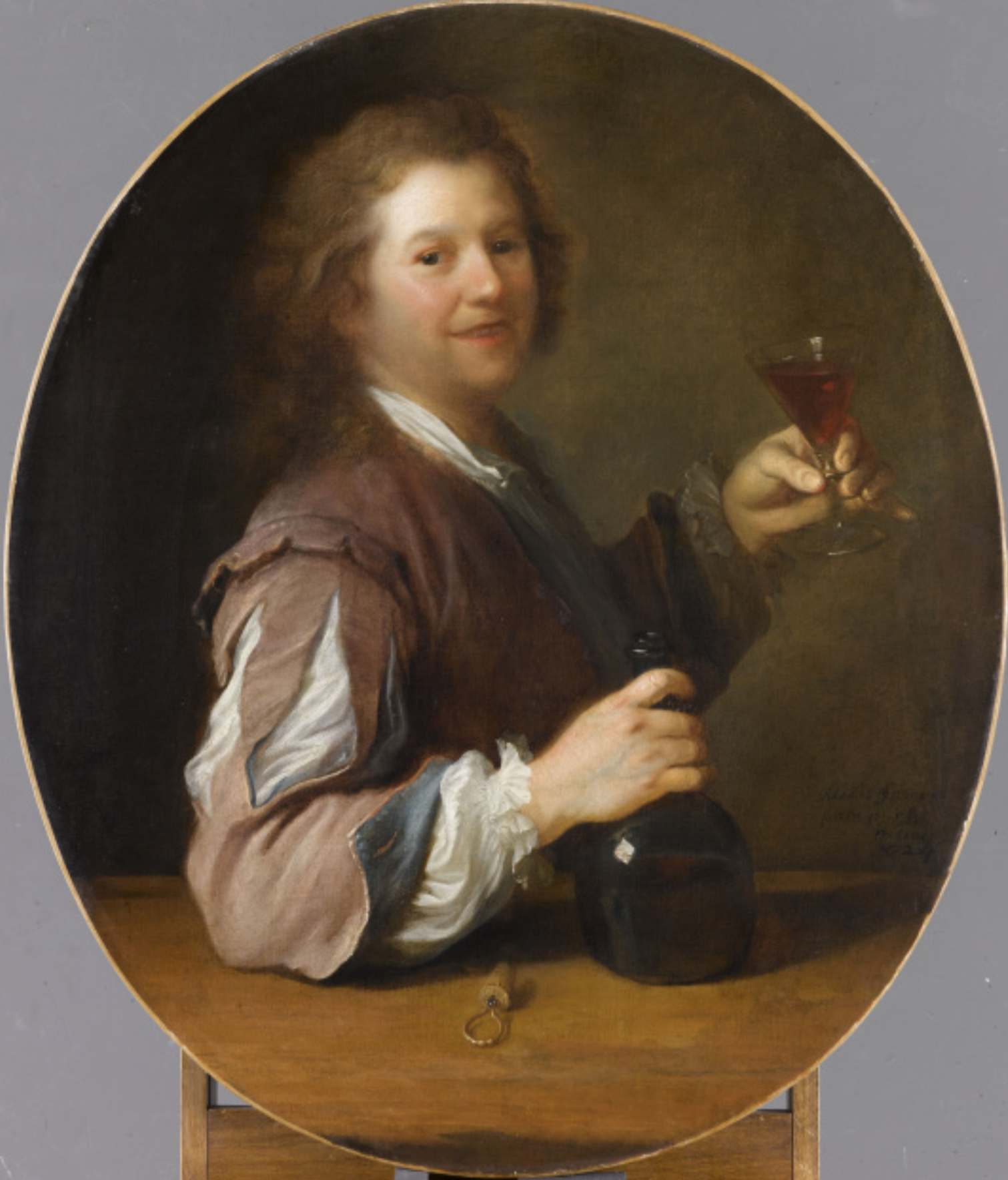
- Self-portrait as a drinker (1724)
- Born: 24 May 1678; Argenteuil, France
- Died: May 1733 (aged 54–55); Paris, France

Alexis Grimou, also Grimoult or Grimoux (1678–1733), was a French portrait painter. He worked for an elite clientele and was called the French Rembrandt as he introduced the Northern European style of portrait painting in France. Many of his intimate portraits at half-lengths were influential on the development of 18th-century portrait painting in France. Portrait painters such as Jean-Honoré Fragonard and Jean-Baptiste Greuze were influenced by his work.

== Life ==
Grimou was born in Argenteuil on 24 May 1678, the son of a carpenter. He is often confused with Jean Grimou (1674–1733), an unrelated Swiss genre painter whose father served with the Swiss Guards at Versailles. Grimou probably trained with François de Troy, from whom he learnt to use a warm palette and simple pictorial compositions. Sometime in the late 1690s, he was apprenticed to the painter and engraver Bon Boullogne.

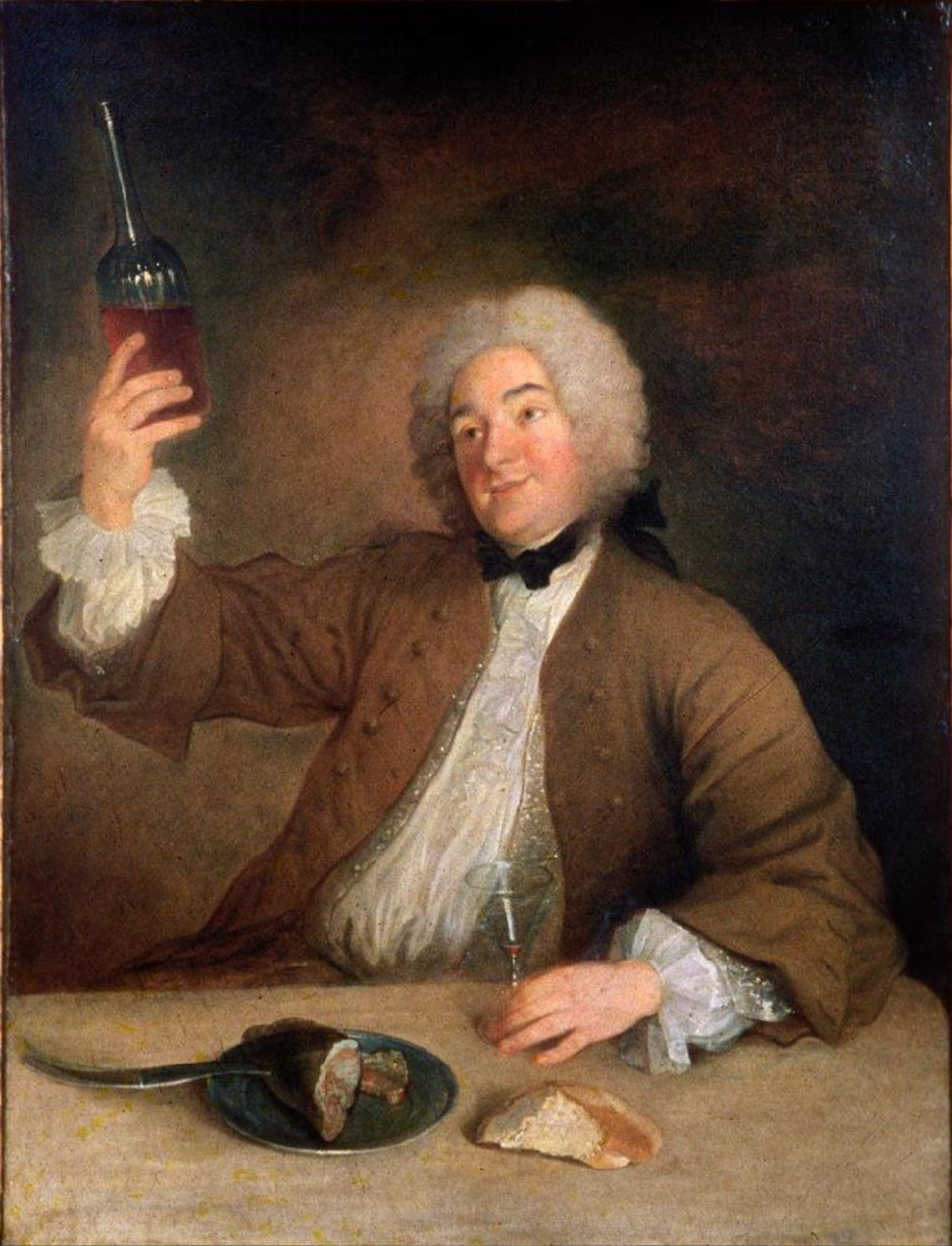
The Marquis d’Artaguiette as a drinker

In 1704, he married Marie-Gabrielle Petit, a niece of Procopio Cutò, founder of the Café Procope, a meeting place for artists and intellectuals. Economics may have been a motive in the union, as a notary document in the Archives Nationales reveals that she owned a considerable amount of property on Mauritius; along with slaves and "autres effets mobiliers et immobiliers" (other assets, moveable and immoveable).

His brother-in-law, Matthias François Petit, was the intermediary who, between 1740 and 1753, was commissioned to purchase art for the collection of King Friedrich II of Prussia. That collection would come to include numerous works by Boullogne and his students.

In 1705 he was approved (agréé) by the Académie Royale. In order to be admitted as full member of the Académie he was required to paint two reception pieces, being portraits of the sculptor Jean Raon, who died before it was completed, and the painter Antoine Coypel, whose portrait was still unfinished by 1709. As a result of his failure to present the reception pieces, he was removed from the list of the Académie. He then joined the Académie de Saint-Luc instead.

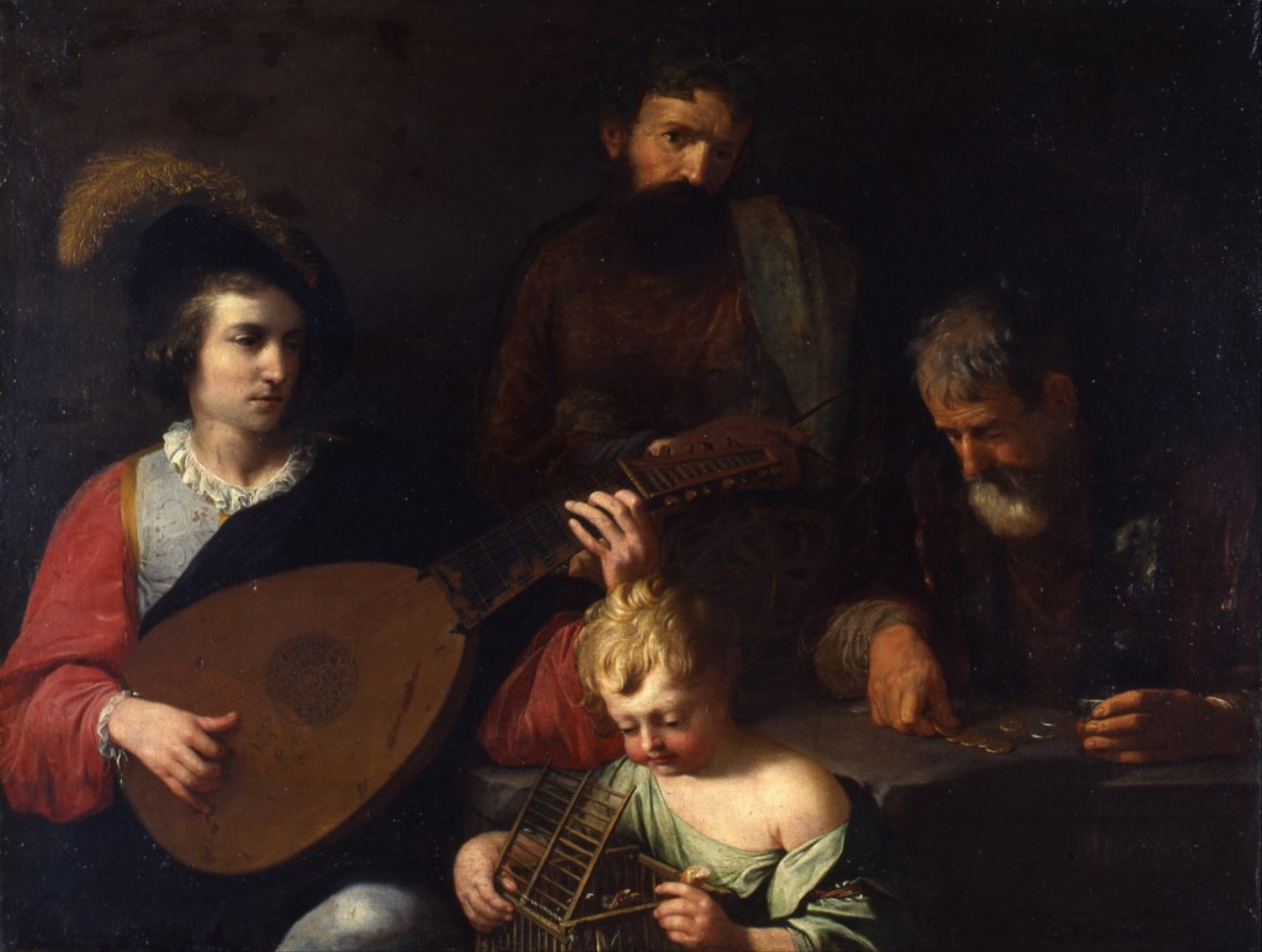
The four ages of man

In 1709, he may have visited the Netherlands to copy the Dutch Masters. This is inferred from a sudden darkening in his palette and some copies after Dutch masters which he made later. Known to have a dissolute lifestyle, he was always in debt and often paid his creditors with small works done on the spot. He was in his time referred to as a weird and strange person, in particular for his heavy drinking. According to contemporary anecdotes he always had five bottles of good burgundy with him while he painted. In 1805, he was the subject of a vaudeville entitled "Grimou ou Le portrait a finir", which was staged by Maxime de Redon in Paris. From 1720 until his death, for unknown reasons, he became much more responsible and productive.

He died in 1733, well known and appreciated for his work.

== Work ==
Grimou painted mainly portraits at half-length which are intimate in nature and often include a genre aspect. Because of the influence of Dutch genre and portrait painting and the use of chiaroscuro techniques similar to those used by Rembrandt in his works, he was sometimes called the "French Rembrandt". Grimou developed the moralistic traits in Dutch genre portraits into budding representations of new concept of aesthetic taste. The artist projected a refined image in his self-portraits as a drinker and as Bacchus.

His fantasy portraits which are close to Dutch tronies were influential on French portrait painters in the 18th century such as Jean-Honoré Fragonard, Charles Eisen, Joseph Ducreux and Jean-Baptiste Greuze. He was so successful that he often created many variations on the same types such as that of the Young Male and Female Pilgrims which he painted as pendants.

== Gallery ==
Selected works

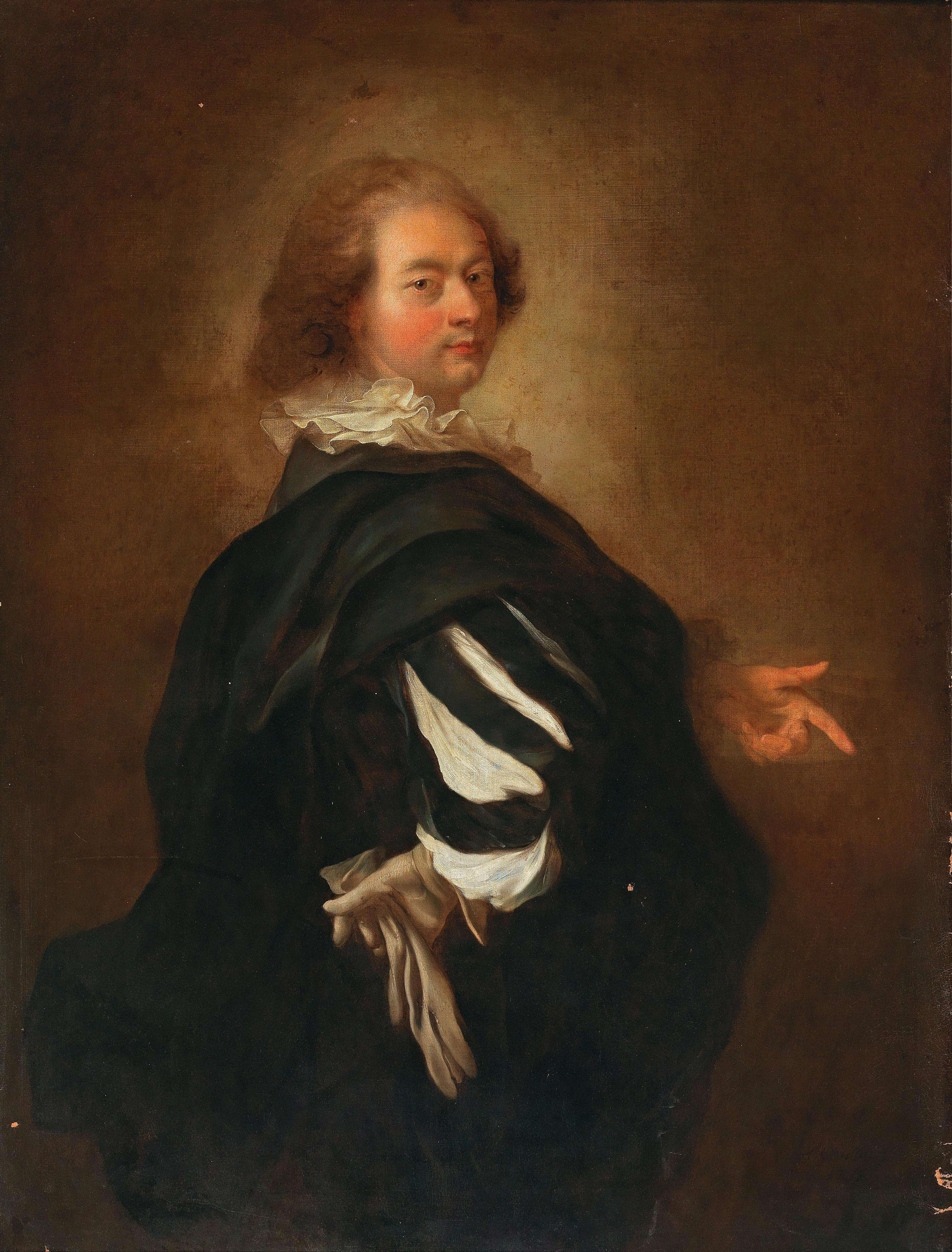
Portrait of a gentleman dressed à la Van Dyck, probably a self-portrait

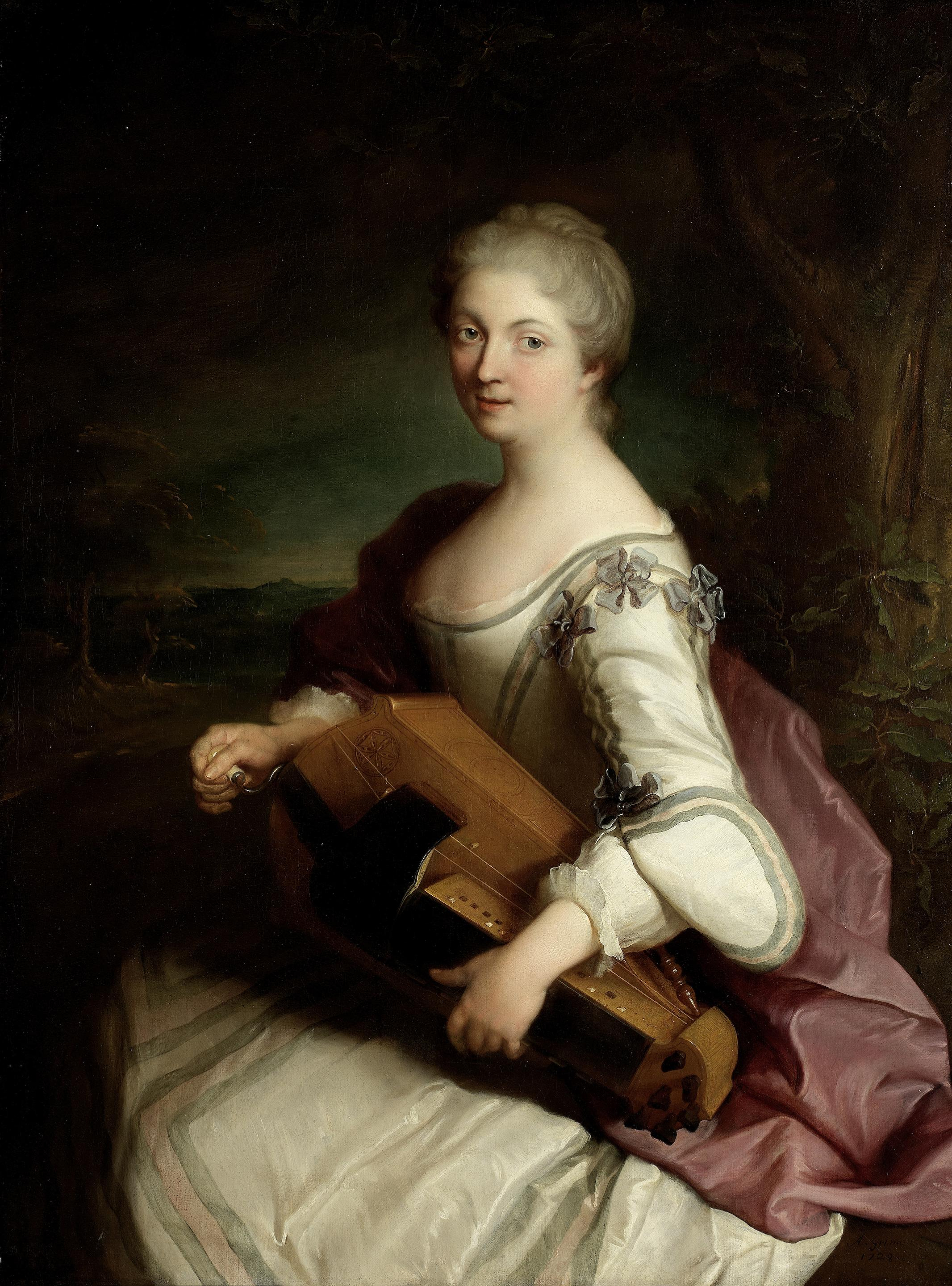
Portrait of a woman playing a hurdy gurdy

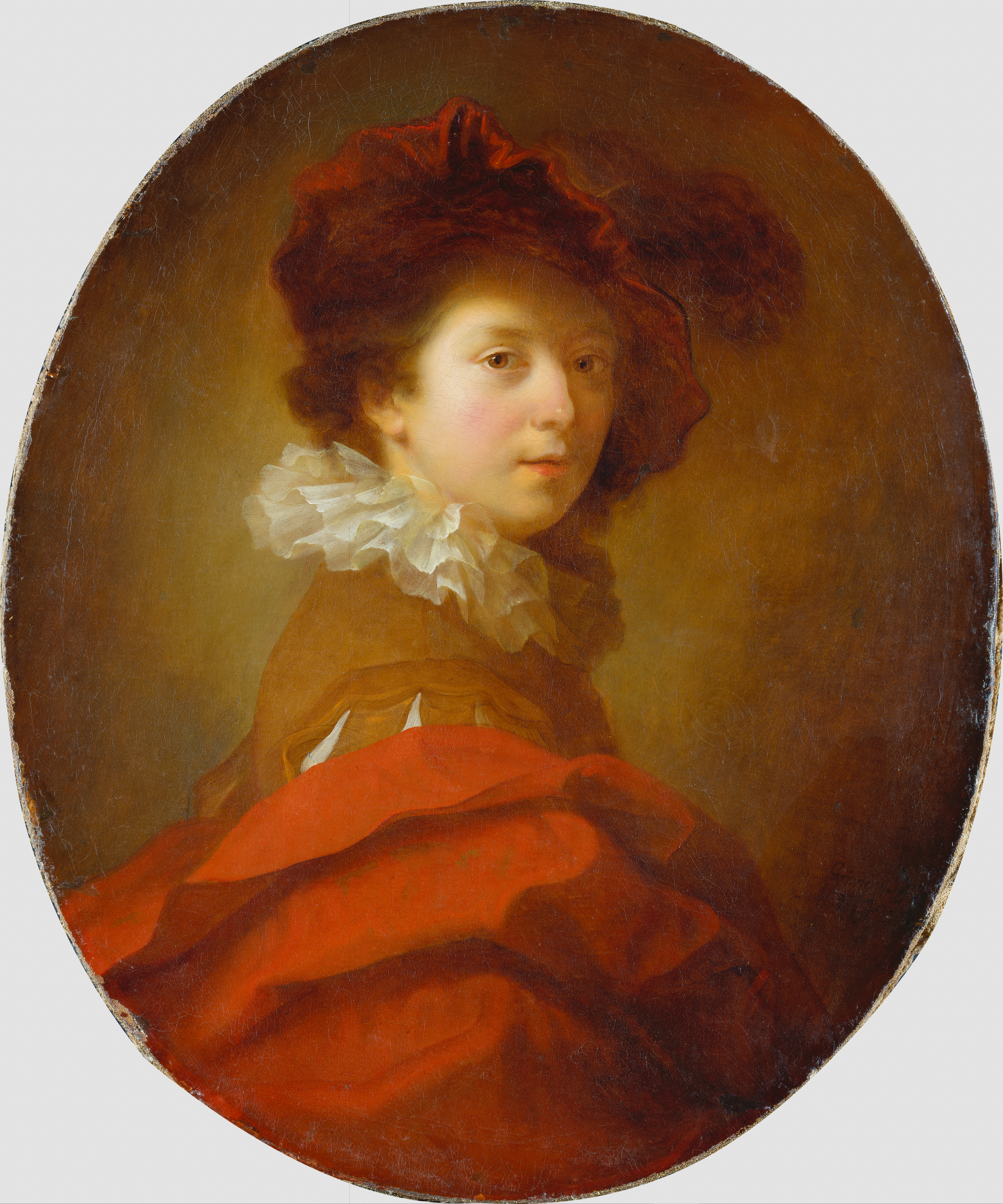
Portrait of a young man

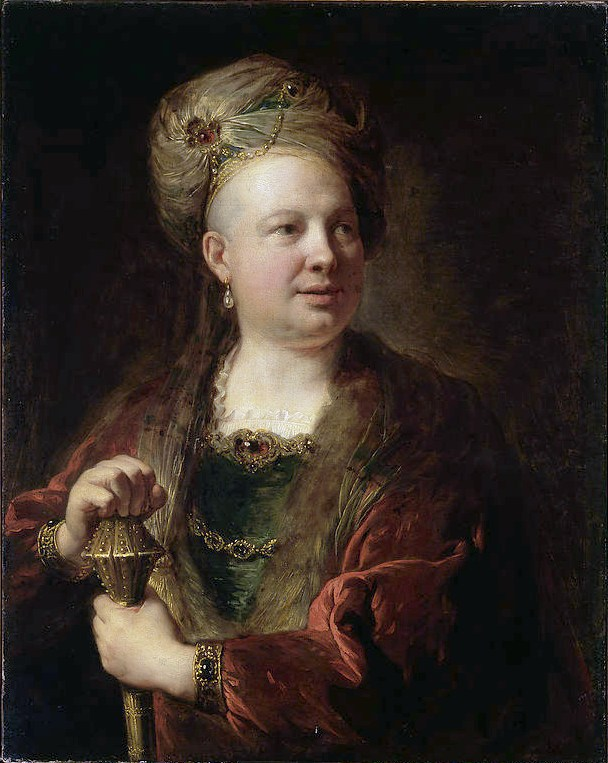
Le Marquis d’Artaguiette en buveur
musée Bernard-d'Agesci

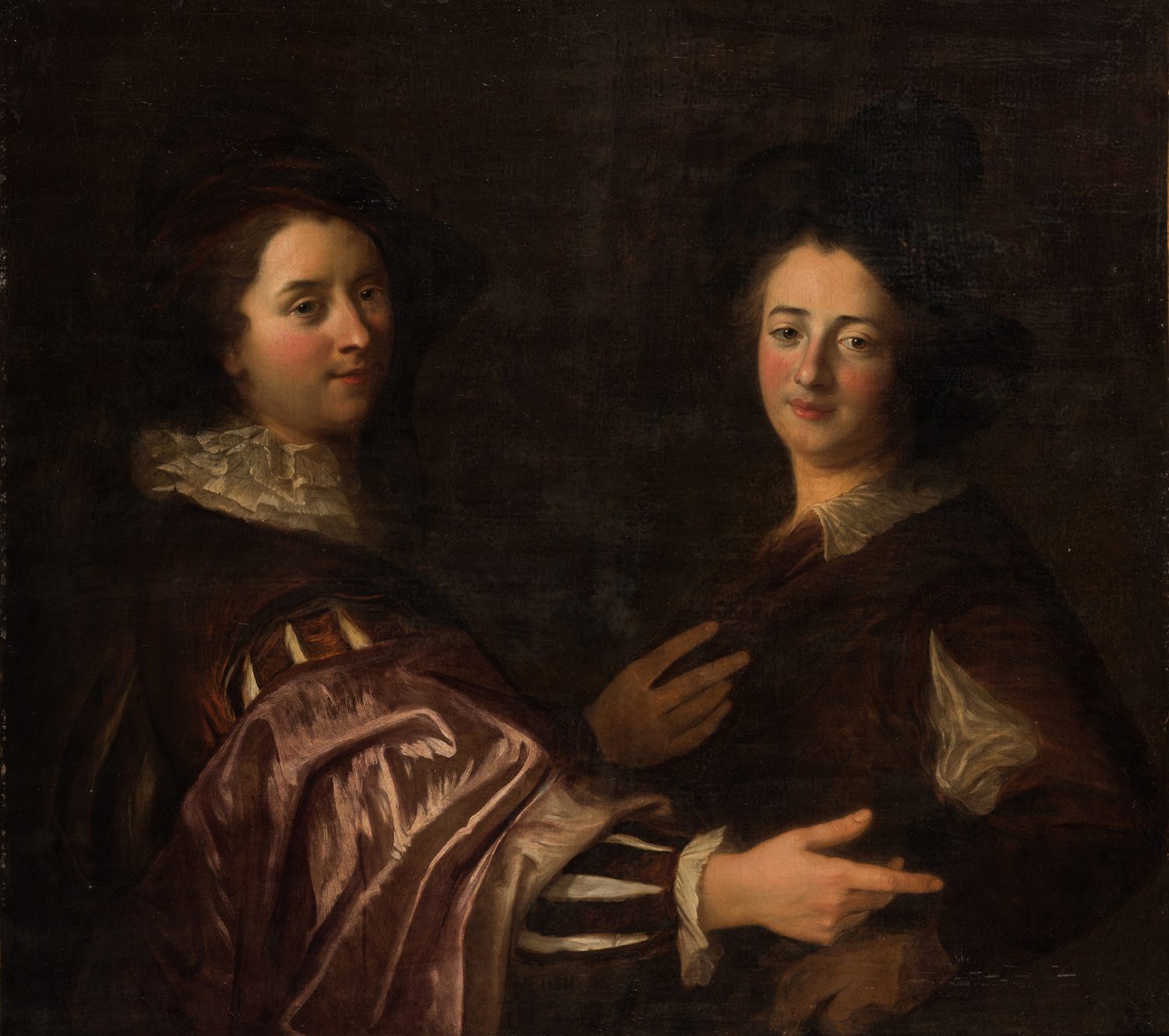
Portrait of Mrs Héron de la Tuilerie and Héron de Courgy, in Flemish costume

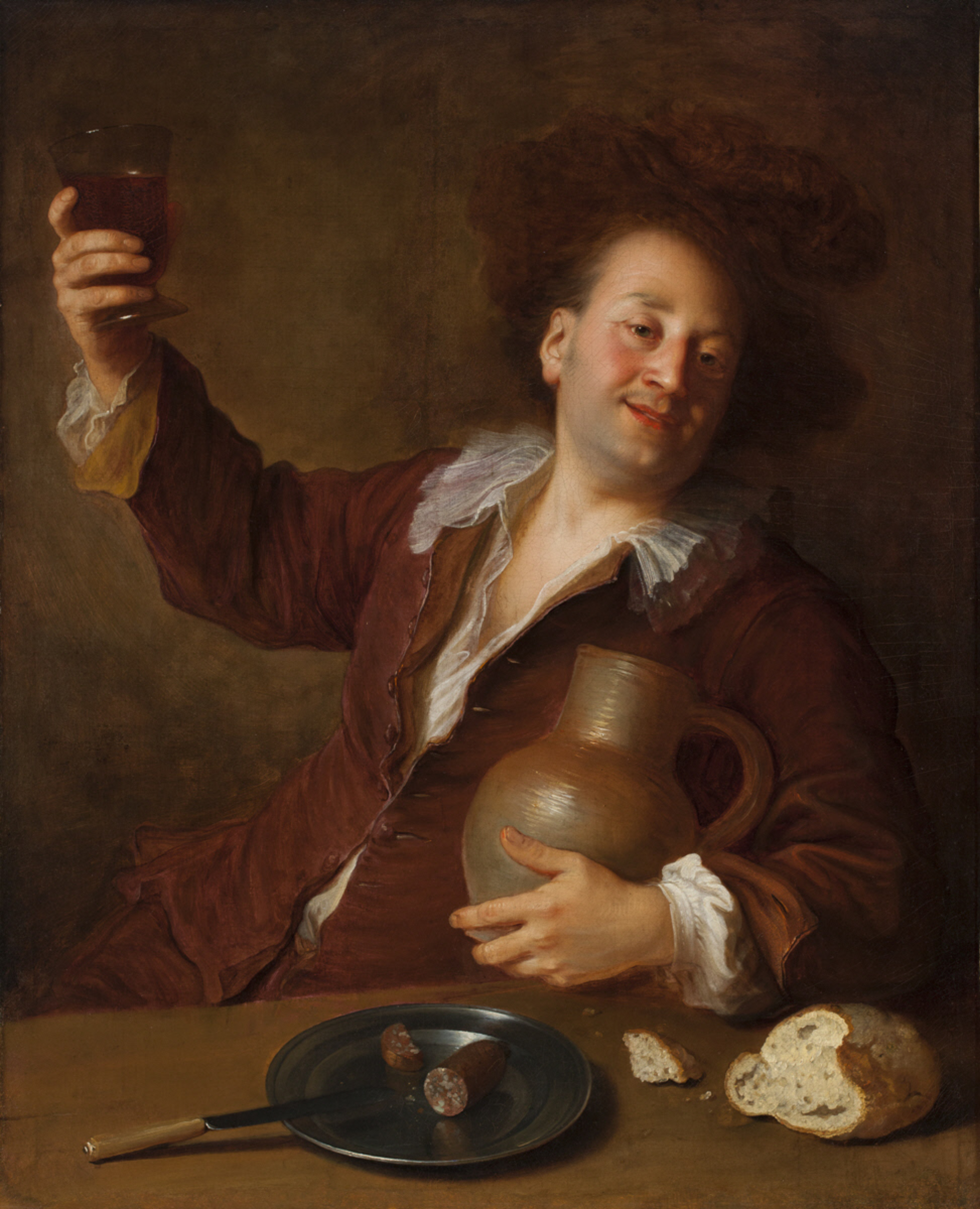
The toper

== Sources ==
- Cyrille Gabillot, Alexis Grimou, peintre français (1678-1733), Gazette des Beaux-Arts, Paris, 1911
- Levitine, George (Autumn 1968). "The Eighteenth-Century Rediscovery of Alexis Grimou and the Emergence of the Proto-Bohemian Image of the French Artist". Eighteenth-Century Studies. 2 (1): 58–76. JSTOR 2737654.
- Maisant, Corinne (1996). "Grimou, Alexis". In Turner, Jane, ed. The Dictionary of Art. 13. New York: Grove's Dictionaries. pp. 665–666. ISBN 1-884446-00-0. OCLC 1033667059.
- Louis Réau, "Grimou, 1678 à 1733", in Louis Dimier (Ed.), Les Peintres français du XVIIIe siècle, Vol.2, G. Van Oest, Paris, Brussels, 1930, pgs.195-215.
