= Zachary G. Ives =

American computer scientist

- Citizenship: United States of America
- Occupations: Computer Scientist, Professor
- Awards: ACM Fellow, ACM SIGMOD Best Paper Award (2024), National Science Foundation CAREER Award, ICDE 10-Year Most Influential Paper Award

Academic background
- Education: MS, PhD, University of Washington
- Thesis: Efficient Query Processing for Data Integration (2002)
- Doctoral advisor: Alon Halevy
- Other advisor: Daniel S. Weld

Academic work
- Discipline: AI Systems, Data Systems
- Institutions: University of Pennsylvania
- Website: https://www.cis.upenn.edu/~zives/

Zachary G. Ives is an American computer scientist. He is the Adani President's Distinguished professor and the Chair of Computer and information science at the University of Pennsylvania. His areas of interest include data systems, large scale data processing, and data integration.

He is a co-author of DBpedia, a large scale community-project aiming to extract structured content from the information created in Wikipedia and served as an early precursor to more developed knowledge graphs used for modern search engines like Google's Knowledge Graph.

== Career and research ==
Ives completed his PhD at the University of Washington in 2002 under the direction of Alon Halevy and Daniel S. Weld. Upon completing his PhD, Ives joined the University of Pennsylvania School of Engineering and Applied Science (UPenn). As a professor at UPenn, Ives' research focuses on data systems and data integrations including AI, databases, and data science. His work in data systems and data integrations has been recognized by the Association for Computing Machinery (ACM) and National Science Foundation. His co-authored paper Schema Mediation in Peer Data Management Systems was named one of the International Council for Open and Distance Education's (ICDE) Most Influential Papers. In 2012, Ives co-edited a textbook called Principles of Data Integration with AnHai Doan and Alon Halevy.

Ives was also a visiting scientist at Google until 2013, working on Google Search.

Starting in 2016, for several years, Ives served as the Associate Dean of Master's & Professional Programs for the University of Pennsylvania's School of Engineering and Applied Science. In 2018, Ives was appointed the Adani President's Distinguished professor. He was later elected an ACM Fellow in 2021 for his "contributions to data integration, sharing, and management for scientific application." As the Computer and Information Science Department Chair, Ives oversaw the establishment of Penn's first AI major for undergraduate students.
