= Arion =

Legendary musician of ancient Greece

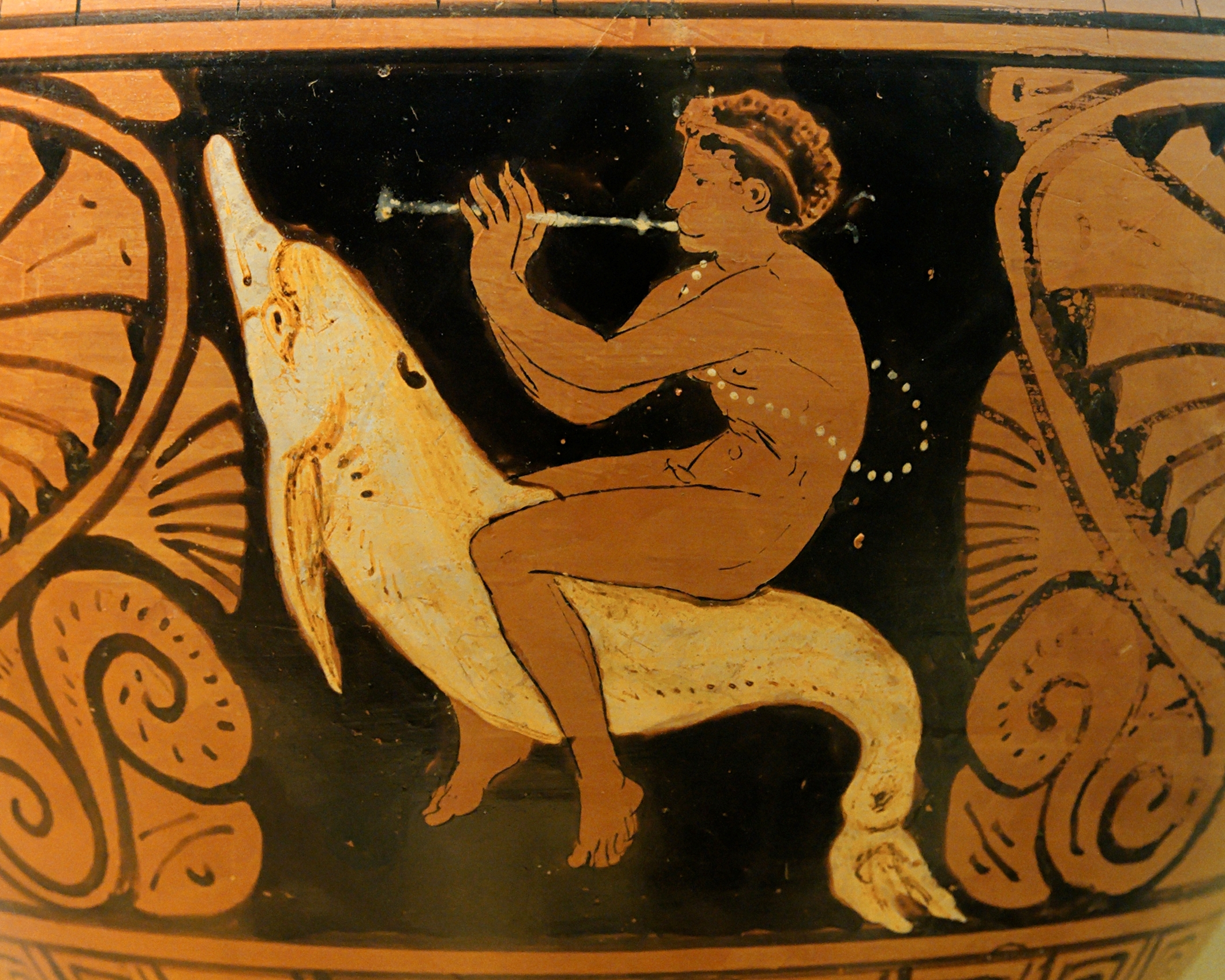
A musician riding a dolphin, on a Red-figure stamnos (360–340 BC) from Etruria. In this case the musician is an aulete rather than a kitharode, as he is playing the flute (aulos) rather than a kithara.

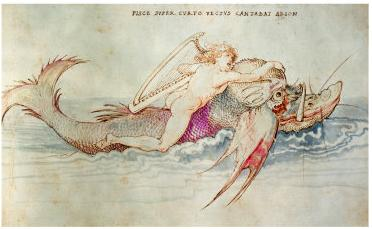
Arion riding a Dolphin, by Albrecht Dürer (c. 1514)

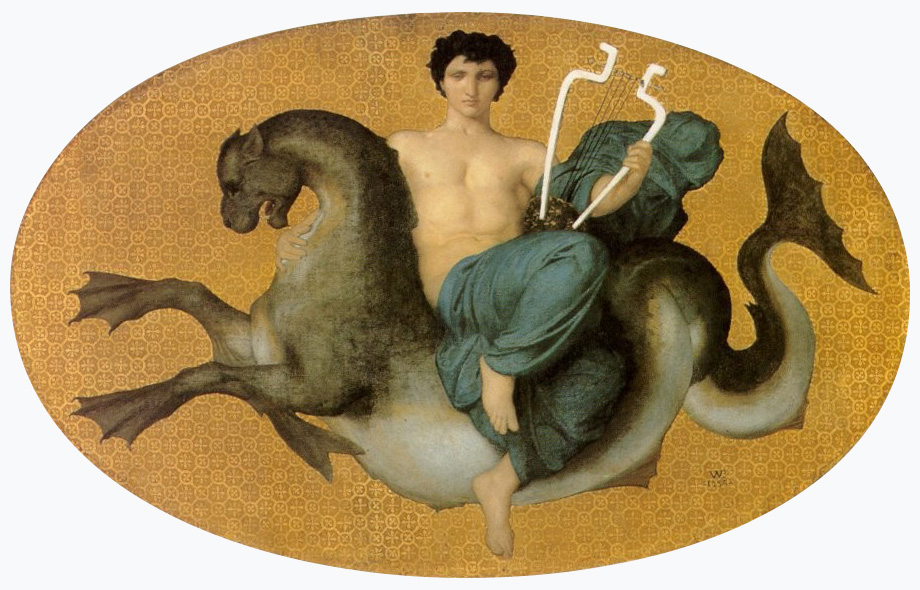
Arion on a Sea Horse, by William-Adolphe Bouguereau (1855)

Arion (/əˈraɪən/; Ancient Greek: Ἀρίων) was a kitharode in ancient Greece, a Dionysiac poet credited with inventing the dithyramb. The islanders of Lesbos claimed him as their native son, but Arion found a patron in Periander, tyrant of Corinth. Although notable for his musical inventions, Arion is chiefly remembered for the fantastic myth of his kidnapping by pirates and miraculous rescue by dolphins, a folktale motif.

== Origins ==
Arion was a native of Methymna in Lesbos, and, according to some mythological accounts, a son of Cyclon or of Poseidon and the nymph Oncaea. All traditions about him agree in describing him as a contemporary and friend of Periander, tyrant of Corinth. He appears to have spent a great part of his life at the court of Periander, but respecting his life and his poetical or musical productions, scarcely anything is known beyond the story of his escape from the sailors with whom he sailed from Sicily to Corinth.

== The dithyramb ==
Arion is often called the inventor of the dithyrambic poetry, and of the name dithyramb. As Arthur Wallace writes: "As a literary composition for chorus dithyramb was the creation of Arion of Corinth," His fame was established in antiquity, and Herodotus says "Arion was second to none of the lyre-players in his time and was also the first man we know of to compose and name the dithyramb and teach it in Corinth". However, J. H. Sleeman observes of the dithyramb, or circular chorus, "It is first mentioned by Archilochus (c. 665 BC) ... Arion flourished at least 50 years later ... probably gave it a more artistic form, adding a chorus of 50 people, personating satyrs... who danced around an altar of Dionysus. He was doubtless the first to introduce the dithyramb into Corinth". Armand D'Angour notes that Arion's contribution to the reform of the dithyramb, which was eventually performed in a circle and called kuklios choros, was recognised by ancient sources by the fact that they named his father Kukleus ("Circle-man").

Arion is also associated with the origins of tragedy: of Solon John the Deacon reports: “Arion of Methymna first introduced the drama [i.e. action] of tragedy, as Solon indicated in his poem entitled Elegies".

== Kidnapping by pirates ==
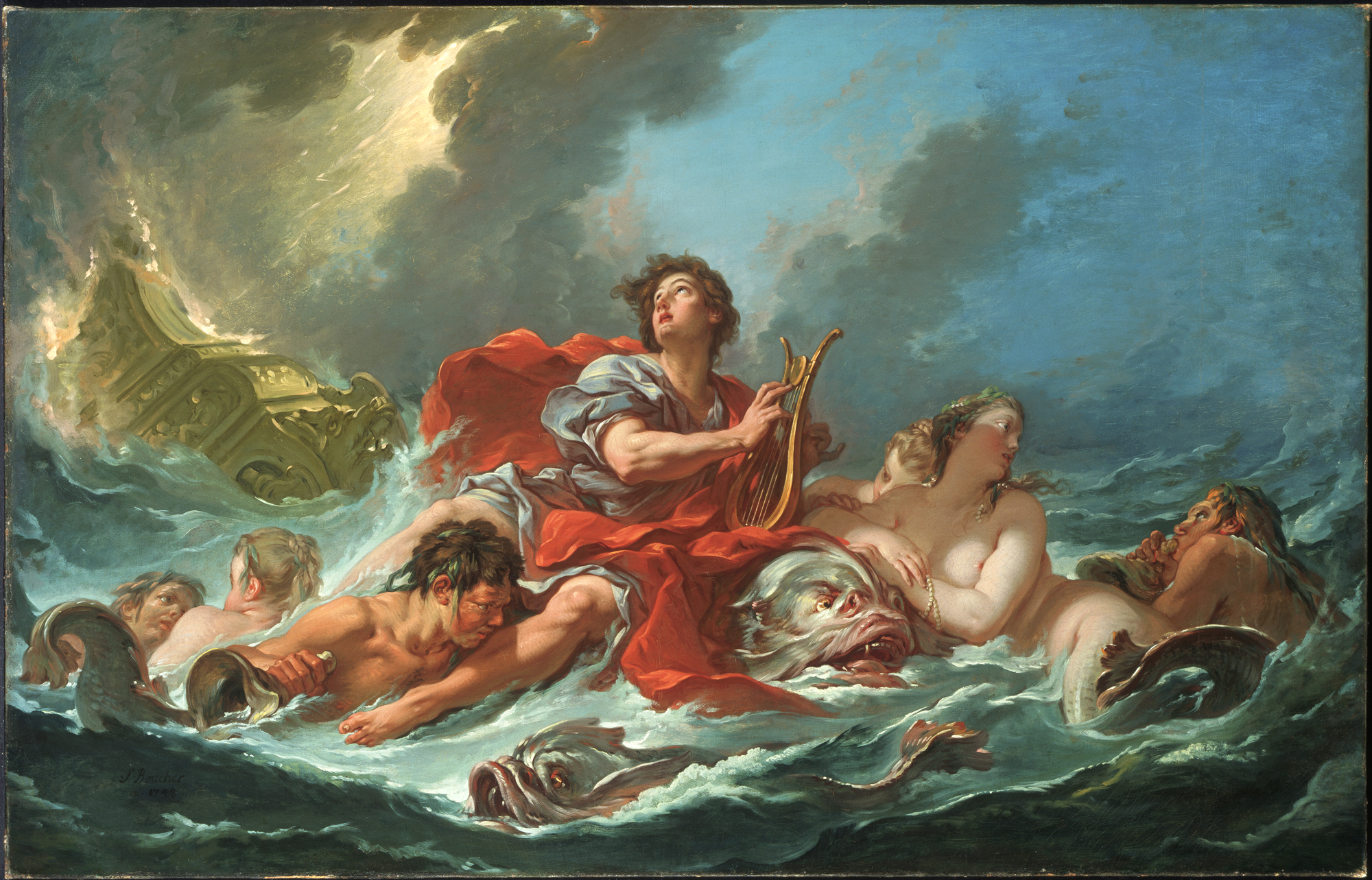
Arion on the Dolphin, by François Boucher (1748) Princeton University Art Museum

According to Herodotus' account of the Lydian empire under the Mermnads, Arion attended a musical competition in Sicily, which he won. On his return trip from Tarentum, whose onomastic founder has a similar story, avaricious sailors plotted to kill Arion and steal the rich prizes he carried home. Arion was given the choice of suicide with a proper burial on land, or being thrown in the sea to perish. He asked for permission to sing a last song to win time.

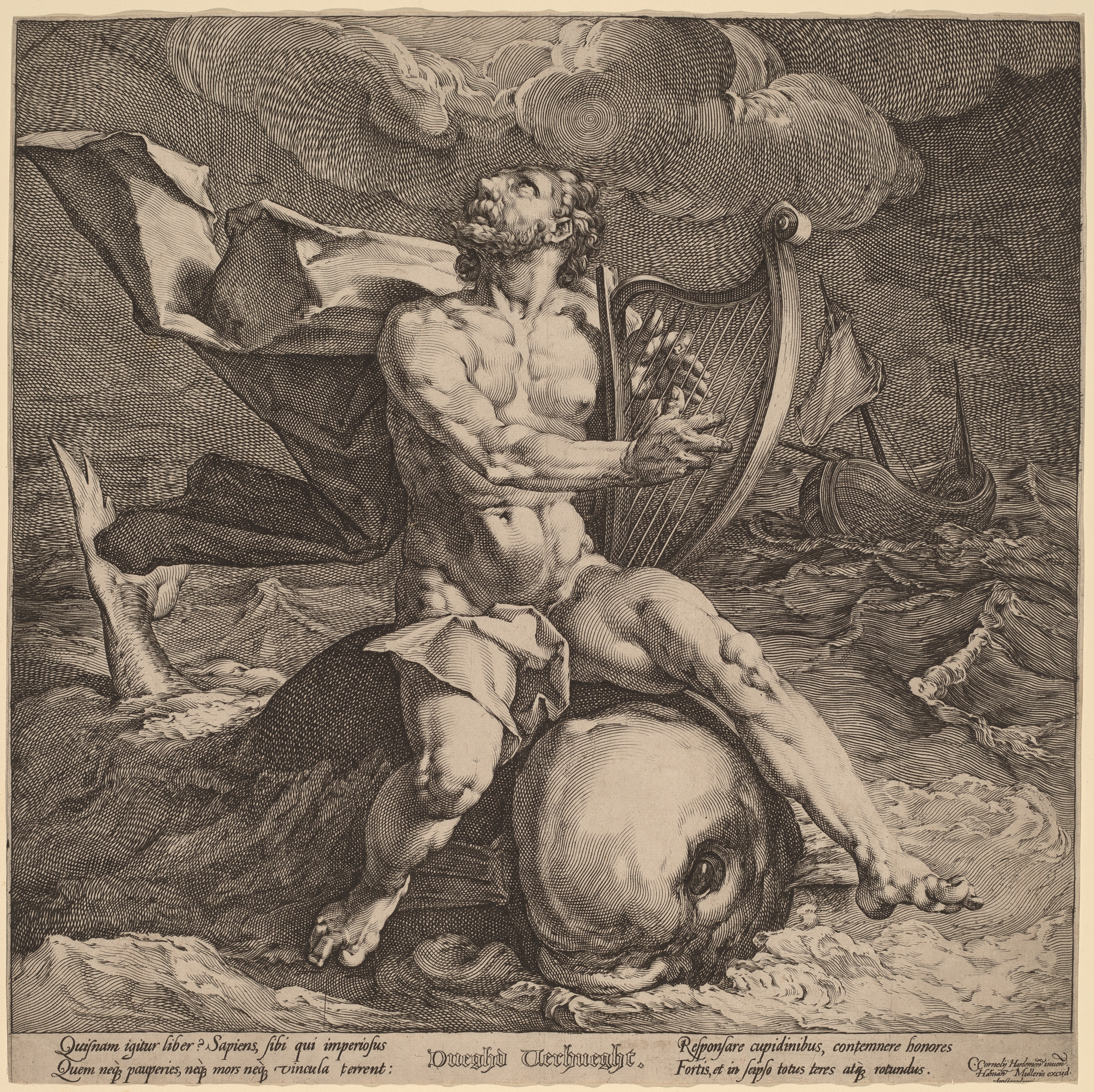
Jan Muller after Cornelis van Haarlem, Arion on a Dolphin (c. 1590) National Gallery of Art

Playing his kithara, Arion sang a praise to Apollo, the god of poetry, and his song attracted a number of dolphins around the ship. Some argue that the dolphins were sent by Apollo to rescue Arion. At the end of the song, Arion threw himself into the sea rather than be killed, but one of the dolphins saved his life and carried him to safety at the sanctuary of Poseidon at Cape Tainaron. When he reached land, being eager for his journey, he failed to return the dolphin to the sea and it perished there. He told his misfortunes to Periander, the Tyrant of Corinth, who ordered the dolphin to be buried, and monument raised to it. Shortly after, word came to Periander that the ship on which Arion had sailed had been brought to Corinth by a storm. He ordered the crew to be led before him, and inquired about Arion, but they replied that he had died and that they had buried him. The tyrant replied: "Tomorrow you will swear to that at the Dolphin's monument." Because of this he ordered them to be kept under guard, and instructed Arion to hide in the dolphin's monument the next morning, attired as he had been when he had thrown himself into the sea. When the tyrant brought the ship's crew to the dolphin's monument and ordered them to swear by the departed spirit of the dolphin that Arion was dead, Arion came out of the monument. In amazement, wondering by what divinity he had been saved, the ship's crew was silent. The tyrant ordered them to be crucified at the dolphin's monument. Apollo, because of Arion's skill with the kithara, placed him and the dolphin among the stars. This dolphin was catasterised as the constellation Delphinus, by the blessing of Apollo.

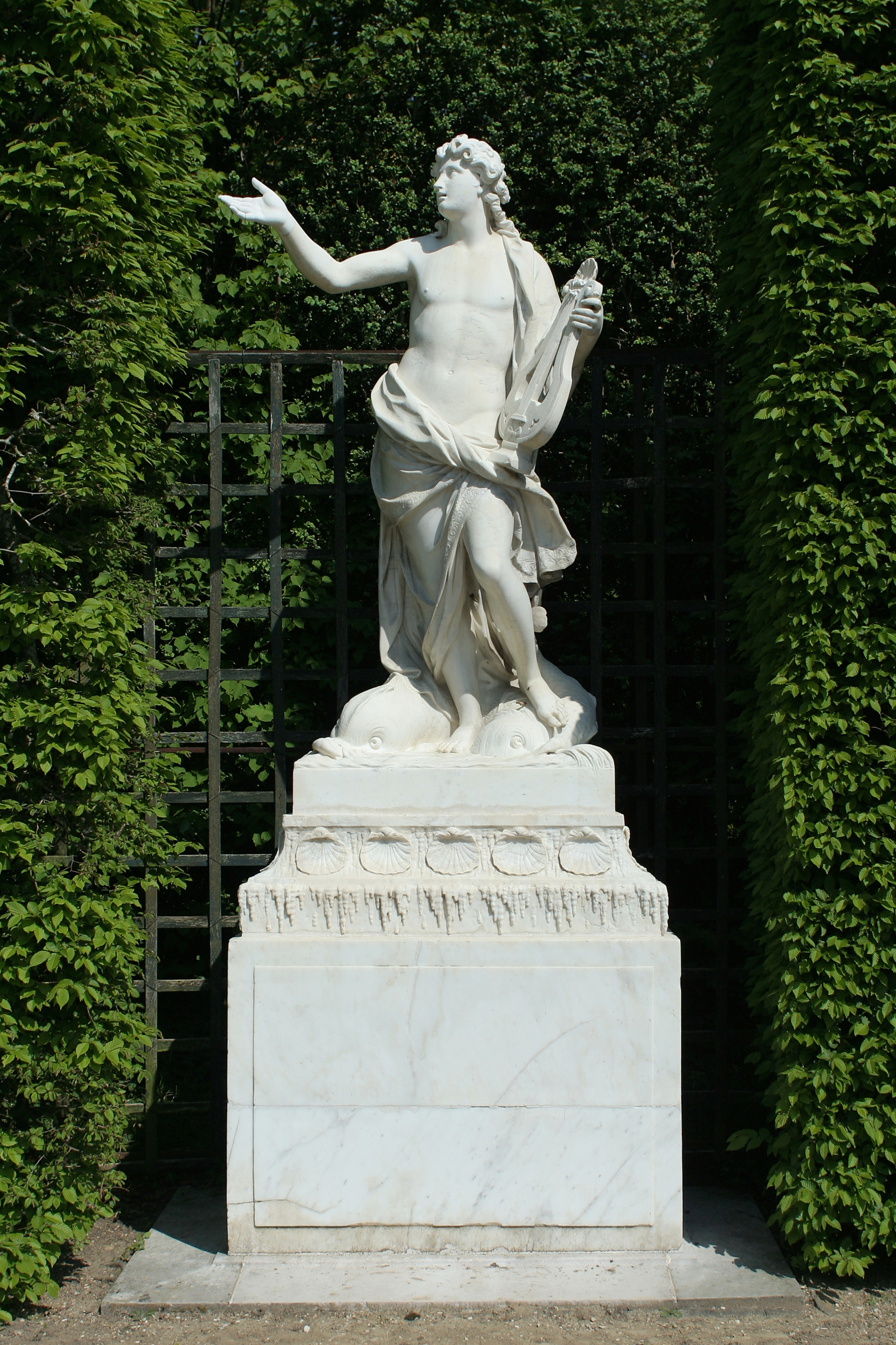
Arion, playing his kithara and riding dolphins. Sculpture by Jean Raon (Grove of the Domes, Gardens of Versailles)

The story as Herodotus tells it was taken up in other literature. Lucian of Samosata wittily imagined the dialogue between Poseidon and the very dolphin who bore Arion.

Augustine of Hippo asserted that pagans "believed in what they read in their own books" and took Arion to be a historical individual. "There is no historicity in this tale", according to Eunice Burr Stebbins, Arion and the dolphins are given as an example of "a folkloristic motif especially associated with Apollo" by Irad Malkin. Erasmus instanced Arion as one of the traditional poet's topics that sound like historia rather than fabulae, though he misremembered that Augustine had taken the Arion story to be historical.

=== Mythological parallels ===
The pirates episode may be seen as a doublet of the fate of Melicertes, where the leap into the sea was that of his mother, Ino, transformed into the "white goddess" Leucothea. Melicertes was carried more dead than alive to the shores where the Isthmian Games were celebrated in his honour, as he was transformed to the hero Palaimon, who was placated with a nocturnal chthonic rite, and the whose winners were crowned with a barren wreath of spruce.

A similar story of told of the founding of Taras in Megale Hellas (Magna Graecia), modern Taranto, Apulia, Italy. When a son of Poseidon called Taras was shipwrecked, his father rescued him by sending a dolphin which he rode to traverse the sea from the promontory of Taenarum to the south of Italy. Brought ashore, Taras founded the city of the same name. According to Pausanias, he was worshiped as a hero who named both the city and the river, Taras after himself.

Another parallel is the myth of Dionysus and the sailors, related in the Homeric Hymns: Tyrrhenian pirates try to lash the god to the mast, but the wood itself starts to sprout and the mast is entwined with ivy (like the god's thyrsus); the sailors leap into the sea and are transformed into dolphins. This is especially interesting because Arion is credited with the invention of the dithyramb, a dionysiac song form.

=== Scholarly interpretations ===
In light of the above parallels, Walter Burkert interprets the story as a significant development in the history of Dionysiac cult: "Released from this gloomy background, the cheerful and liberating legend of the sixth century further developed the image of the dolphin-rider under the colours of the renewed cult of Dionysus.". C. M. Bowra tied the myth to the period following the expulsion from Corinth of the aristocratic Bacchiadae, who traced their descent from Dionysus: "the cult of the god had to develop new and more democratic forms."

Stewart Flory identified Herodotus' characteristic use of the episode in a historicising context as an example of what Flory calls his "brave gestures", a man faced with death performs with calm dignity some spirited but unnecessary gesture that demonstrates contempt for danger.

== Surviving fragment ==
A fragment of a hymn to Poseidon, quoted by Aelian and by him ascribed to Arion, has survived, and is contained in Bergk's Poetae Lyrici Graeci. A poetic translation was made by the English schoolmaster Herbert Kynaston. A more literal prose rendering follows:

Chiefest of Gods, sea-lord Poseidon of the trident of gold, earth-shaking king of the swelling (Note: or teeming) brine, the beasts that swim dance all about thee with fins, and lightly bound with nimble flingings of the foot, the snub-nosed coarsing hounds of bristling mane, the dolphin-lovers of the Muse, sea-creatures of Nereus' goddess-daughters that he had of Amphitrite, the beasts that bore a wanderer on the Sicilian sea to Taenarum's shore in Pelops' land, ploughing to the untrodden furrow of Nereus' field astride their humpèd back, when crafty men had cast me from out the hollow wave-going ship into the sea-purple billows of the ocean.

== In literature ==
Letitia Elizabeth Landon's narrative poem Arion examines and illustrates the story of Arion's return to Greece.

Alexander Pushkin's 1827 Arion poem, where Arion is the sole survivor of a shipwreck after a sea storm and continues to sing the same songs with which he used to delight his shipmates, is thought to be a thinly veiled allusion to his own situation after the Decembrist revolt of 1825.

George Eliot's poem of the same name recounts Arion's murder by pirates ("sailors"), with, however, no mention of him being saved by dolphins.

In Amor Towles' 2016 novel A Gentleman in Moscow, the Count tells Anna the story of Arion, after tracing freckles that reminded him of a dolphin on her back.

Jimmy Buffett and Savannah Jane Buffett's children's story The Jolly Mon is heavily based on this myth, though they play with the symbolism and also incorporate many mentions of the similar sounding constellation Orion as well.

== In Astronomy ==
Inspired by the lifeguard dolphin story, the name Arion was given in 2015 to a possible exoplanet orbiting the star 18 Delphini, which was named Musica at the same time.

== See also ==
- Arion (journal), named for the poet
- Arion (horse), also from Greek myth but unrelated to the poet
- Taras (mythology), founder of the city of Taranto, saved by dolphins after a shipwreck
- Melicertes (Palaemon), deified son of Ino (Leucothea), often depicted mounted on a dolphin
- Amphitrite, wife of Poseidon, carried to him by Delphinus
- Acoetes (Bacchic myth), in whose myth the god Dionysus is kidnapped by pirates but turns the pirates into dolphins instead
- Delphi § Myths regarding the origin of the precinct, in which Apollo transforms himself into a dolphin

== Bibliography ==
- "Arion (1)", William Smith (ed.) Dictionary of Greek and Roman Biography and Mythology. 3. Boston: Little, Brown & Co., 1867.
- Burkert, Walter, Homo Necans (University of California Press) 1983, III.7 "The Return of the Dolphin" pp 196–204.
