= Ruy Blas =

1838 play by Victor Hugo

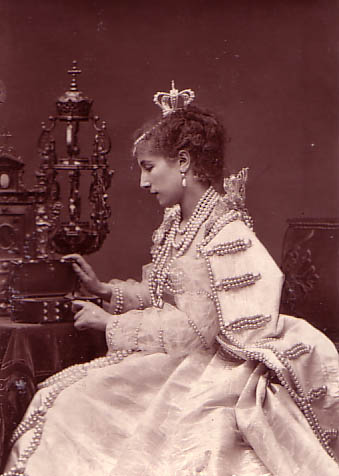
- Sarah Bernhardt as the Queen, 1879
- Written by: Victor Hugo
- Genre: tragic drama

Premiere
- Date: November 8, 1838
- Place: Théâtre de la Renaissance

Ruy Blas (French pronunciation: [ʁɥi blɑ]) is a tragic drama by Victor Hugo. It was the first play presented at the Théâtre de la Renaissance and opened on November 8, 1838. Though considered by many to be Hugo’s best drama, the play was initially met with only average success.

== Characters ==
- Ruy Blas
- Don Salluste de Bazan, Marquis of Finlas
- Don César de Bazan, Count Of Garofa
- Don Guritan
- The Count of Camporeal
- The Marquis of Santa-Cruz
- The Marquis of Basto
- The Count of Albe
- The Marquis of Priego
- Don Manuel Arias
- Montazgo
- Don Antonio Ubilla
- Covadenga
- Gudiel
- Doña Maria de Neubourg, Queen of Spain
- The Duchess of Albuquerque
- Casilda
- A lackey, an alcalde, alguacils, pages, ladies, lords, privy councillors, chaperones, guards, chamber and court bailiffs

== Synopsis ==
The scene is Madrid; the time 1699, during the reign of Charles II. Ruy Blas, an indentured commoner (and a poet), dares to love the Queen. The play is a thinly veiled cry for political reform.

The story centers around a practical joke played on the Queen, Maria de Neubourg, by Don Salluste de Bazan, in revenge for being scorned by her. Knowing that his valet Ruy Blas has secretly fallen in love with the Queen, and having previously failed to enlist the aid of his scapegrace but chivalrous cousin Don César in his scheme, Don Salluste disguises Blas as a nobleman and takes him to court. Intelligent and generous, Blas becomes popular, is appointed prime minister, begins useful political and fiscal reforms, and conquers the Queen's heart. A long speech, 101 lines, in which he contrasts the sordid struggle for sinecures in a decaying monarchy with the glories of Emperor Charles V (King Charles I of Spain), is notable.

Don Salluste returns to take his revenge. The Queen and Ruy Blas are betrayed into a compromising situation by Don Salluste, who, when Don César threatens to frustrate his revenge, ruthlessly sacrifices his cousin to his injured vanity. Don Salluste discloses the masquerade by cruelly humiliating Blas – he commands Blas to close the window and pick up his handkerchief, while trying to explain the condition of Spanish politics. Blas kills him and decides to commit suicide with poison. At his dying moment, he is forgiven by the Queen who openly declares her love for him.

== Antecedents ==
Hugo says he began to write the play on 4 July 1838. The play has, except for the dénouement, constant and perplexing likeness to Edward Bulwer-Lytton's The Lady of Lyons, first acted on 14 February 1838. The idea of a valet set by a scorned lover to woo a fine lady had been turned to dramatic account in Molière's Les Précieuses ridicules. Hugo certainly used Henri de Latouche's La Reine d'Espagne (1831). In his very inaccurate autobiography, Victor Hugo raconté par un témoin de sa vie, Hugo notes as sources for the play Madame d'Aulnoy's Memoirs de la cour d'Espagne, Relation du voyage d'Espagne (1690), Alonso Nuñez de Castro's Solo Madrid es corte (1675) and Jean de Vayrac's État présent d'Espagne (1718).

== Adaptations ==
- Felix Mendelssohn wrote a song from and an overture to Ruy Blas on commission in 1839. Mendelssohn however detested the play. The overture is his opus 95, the song is La chanson des lavandières in his 3 Lieder (Op. 77) in a translation by the Austrian poet Karl Ferdinand Dräxler.
- Maxime de Redon created a parody, Ruy Brac, first performed in 1838 Maxime de Redon des Chapelles
- Irish actor and dramatist Edmund Falconer translated Ruy Blas in 1858. It was performed at the Princess Theatre, London, in late 1858.
- W. S. Gilbert wrote a burlesque of the play, by the same name, in Warne's Christmas Annual for 1866.
- An opera of the same name by Howard Glover was produced at Theatre Royal, Covent Garden, London, opening on October 24, 1861.
- An opera of the same name, by Filippo Marchetti with a libretto by Carlo d'Ormeville was produced at La Scala in Milan in 1869.
- A musical comedy, Ruy Blas and the Blasé Roué, by A. C. Torr and Herbert F. Clark with music by Meyer Lutz, premiered in 1889.
- A 1948 movie, again called Ruy Blas, was directed by Pierre Billon, adapted by Jean Cocteau, and starring Jean Marais, Danielle Darrieux and Marcel Herrand.
- A 1971 movie, La folie des grandeurs, directed by Gérard Oury, adapted by Danièle Thomson, and starring Alice Sapritch, Louis de Funès and Yves Montand, is also based on the play.
- It also formed the basis for a 2002 telefilm by Jacques Weber, again called Ruy Blas.

== See also ==
- Don César de Bazan
- Maritana
