= Daniel Weld =

Daniel Weld may refer to:

- Daniel Weld (Weld family), colonial Boston teacher
- Daniel S. Weld (born 1960), American computer scientist
