= Sleeman =

Sleeman may refer to:

- Sleeman (surname), a list of people
- the title character of Mr. Sleeman Is Coming, a 1917 play by Hjalmar Bergman
- Sleeman, Ontario, Canada, an unincorporated community
- Sleeman Breweries, a brewing company based in Guelph, Ontario, Canada
- Sleeman Centre, a sports and entertainment venue in Guelph, Ontario
- Sleeman Sports Complex, a sports and entertainment complex in Brisbane, Queensland, Australia
- Sleeman Sports Centre, former name of Chandler Arena, a sports venue in Chandler, Brisbane, Queensland

== See also ==
- Sleeman Centre (disambiguation)
