= Paulo Pinheiro =

Brazilian-American computer scientist

- Born: Rio de Janeiro, Brazil
- Education: Universidade Federal de Minas Gerais; University of Manchester; Stanford University
- Occupation: Computer Scientist
- Employer: Rensselaer Polytechnic Institute
- Known for: Author of the Provenance Markup Language and Unified Modeling Language for Interactive Systems. Founding member of NSF-funded CyberShare Center.
- Title: Research Scientist
- Website: Official website

Paulo Pinheiro is a Brazilian American computer scientist working in the areas of provenance and semantic web in support of sciences. Pinheiro has been a research scientist at the Rensselaer Polytechnic Institute's Tetherless World Constellation since 2013. Between 2011 and 2013, he was a staff scientist at the U.S. Department of Energy's Pacific Northwest National Laboratory. Between 2006 and 2012, he was an associate professor of computer science at the University of Texas at El Paso. Pinheiro is from a long line of scientists and engineers: his father is a retired professor of material sciences at the Universidade Federal de Minas Gerais; his paternal grandfather was the founding Mine Superintendent of Vale S.A., the second largest mining company in the world and Israel Pinheiro da Silva, a great-granduncle, was the chief engineer responsible for the construction of Brasília, the capital of Brazil.

== Education ==
Pinheiro received a licenciatura in mathematics and a master's degree in computer science from the Universidade Federal de Minas Gerais, Brazil, and a Ph.D. in computer science from University of Manchester, United Kingdom, in 2002. Between 2002 and 2005, he was a postdoctoral fellow in the Knowledge Systems Laboratory at Stanford University, United States, and a Sistemas de Informação's faculty member at Faculdades INESC/Unai, Brazil.

== Research ==
Pinheiro's research focuses on innovative ways of using semantically enable resources such as ontologies, abstract process specifications, and distributed provenance in support of trust and uncertainty management for sciences. Pinheiro is the author of the Unified Modeling Language for Interactive Systems (UMLi) developed as part of his PhD work at the Information Management Group at the University of Manchester. Pinheiro is a co-author of the Provenance Markup Language (PML) originally developed at Stanford's Knowledge Systems Laboratory.
