= Knowledge Systems Laboratory =

Coordinates: 37°25′48″N 122°10′24″W

Knowledge Systems Laboratory (KSL) was an artificial intelligence research laboratory within the Department of Computer Science at Stanford University until 2007, located in the Gates Computer Science Building, Stanford. Work focused on knowledge representation for shareable engineering knowledge bases and systems, computational environments for modelling physical devices, architectures for adaptive intelligent systems, and expert systems for science and engineering.

KSL had projects with Stanford Medical Informatics (SMI), the Stanford Artificial Intelligence Lab (SAIL), the Stanford Formal Reasoning Group (SFRG), the Stanford Logic Group, and the Stanford Center for Design Research (CDR).

== Past members ==
This is a partial list (in alphabetical order) of past members:

- Edward Feigenbaum
- Richard Fikes
- Diana E. Forsythe
- Tom Gruber
- William Clancey
- Alon Y. Halevy
- Deborah L. McGuinness
- Paulo Pinheiro
- Derek H. Sleeman
- Barbara Hayes-Roth
- Bruce G. Buchanan
- Ruth Duran Huard
- Lee Brownston
