= Seed provenancing =

Seed provenancing is a seed-sourcing strategy that focuses on the geographic location of seed sources, in the context of ecological restoration and forestry. Seed provenance refers to the geographic location of a parent plant from which seeds were collected.

The genetic material of seed differs between collection locations. Selecting the appropriate provenance is an important decision to ensure the long-term success of restoration efforts by maintaining local genetic-environmental relationships and adaptive potential, while avoiding the risks of outbreeding depression or other harmful genetic effects. The traditional approach to provenancing has been to source seed from within the restoration site (local provenancing), but the threats of climate change have sparked debate on whether the use of nonlocal provenances may be beneficial to the longevity of broadscale restoration efforts under specific circumstances.

== Provenancing strategies ==
=== Local provenancing ===
Local provenancing is a strategy that relies exclusively on using seeds sourced either from within the restoration site (strict local provenance) or from nearby areas (relaxed local provenance) and has long been the focus of restoration guidelines. This strategy is grounded in the concept of local adaptation, maintaining that the use of locally adapted seed is best for the longevity of restoration projects because of their increased fitness in the local environment, decreasing the risk of maladaptation to local conditions and outbreeding depression. It has also been found that the use of local seed can be important to protect important biotic interactions, including pollinator interactions and pathogen resistance.

In the use of local provenancing for broadscale restoration, it can be difficult to define a "local" provenance. It has been argued that the most useful approach to defining a local provenance is one that is genetically informed, such as using significant genetic differentiation (e.g. differentiation in neutral or adaptive genetic markers) to describe provenances. However, this may not be feasible for all restoration practitioners due to the time and costs required of this approach.

=== Nonlocal provenancing strategies ===
Although it has been long-maintained that the use of local provenance is best since local seed will be best adapted to the conditions, arguments have been made to move away from the strict use of local provenance for populations that are expected to face rapidly changing environmental conditions in the face of climate change. This is because the use of local provenancing can establish a population that does not have sufficient adaptive genetic variation to cope with future environmental changes, thus compromising the longevity of broadscale restoration efforts. Additionally, the strict use of local provenance has the potential to encourage inbreeding and low genetic variation in a population, further threatening a population's ability to persist long-term. With this, many new provenancing strategies have been proposed to supplement local provenances with nonlocal ones to maximize evolutionary potential to increase the long-term success of restored populations that are facing changing environmental conditions; these proposed strategies include admixture, composite, climate-adjusted, and predictive provenancing.

These proposed provenancing techniques are not applicable to all restoration efforts, and the success of each one depends on the contextual factors of each population, which include:

- Plant species biology, demography, and evolutionary history
- Landscape heterogeneity and dynamics
- Priorities, resources, and scale of the restoration practitioner

These recently proposed techniques are based upon a more theoretical foundation, as there has been limited experimental testing done. Thus, there is much future research needed to create a framework to guide a practical application of these proposed provenancing techniques in restoration contexts; this research may focus on gathering evidence-based restoration practices via field testing, furthering knowledge of adaptive processes, and assessing potential risks and benefits of each provenancing technique.

==== Admixture provenancing ====
Admixture provenancing mixes a wide variety of provenances across a species range, providing seed from each provenance in equal proportions. The purpose of this provenancing technique is to increase standing genetic variation in a population, thus increasing the adaptive potential.

==== Composite provenancing ====
Composite provenancing aims to mimic gene flow dynamics as a way to build adaptive potential into a restored population; this is done by mixing seed from both local and non-local provenances but with a larger proportion of local seed and progressively smaller amounts of seed from more distant provenances.

==== Climate-adjusted provenancing ====
Climate-adjusted provenancing aims to enhance the climate resilience of a restored population. It incorporates a mix of local and non-local provenances from a climatic gradient, using more seeds from environments more likely to be encountered in the future. This strategy would introduce pre-adapted genotypes into the population, maintaining genetic variation and improving the evolutionary resilience of the population.

==== Predictive provenancing ====
Predictive provenancing is a strategy designed to increase a restored population's adaptive capacity in the face of a changing climate. In this strategy, it is proposed to source seed from plants that are naturally adapted to future climatic conditions the target population is predicted to face, introducing pre-adapted genotypes.

== Practical applications ==
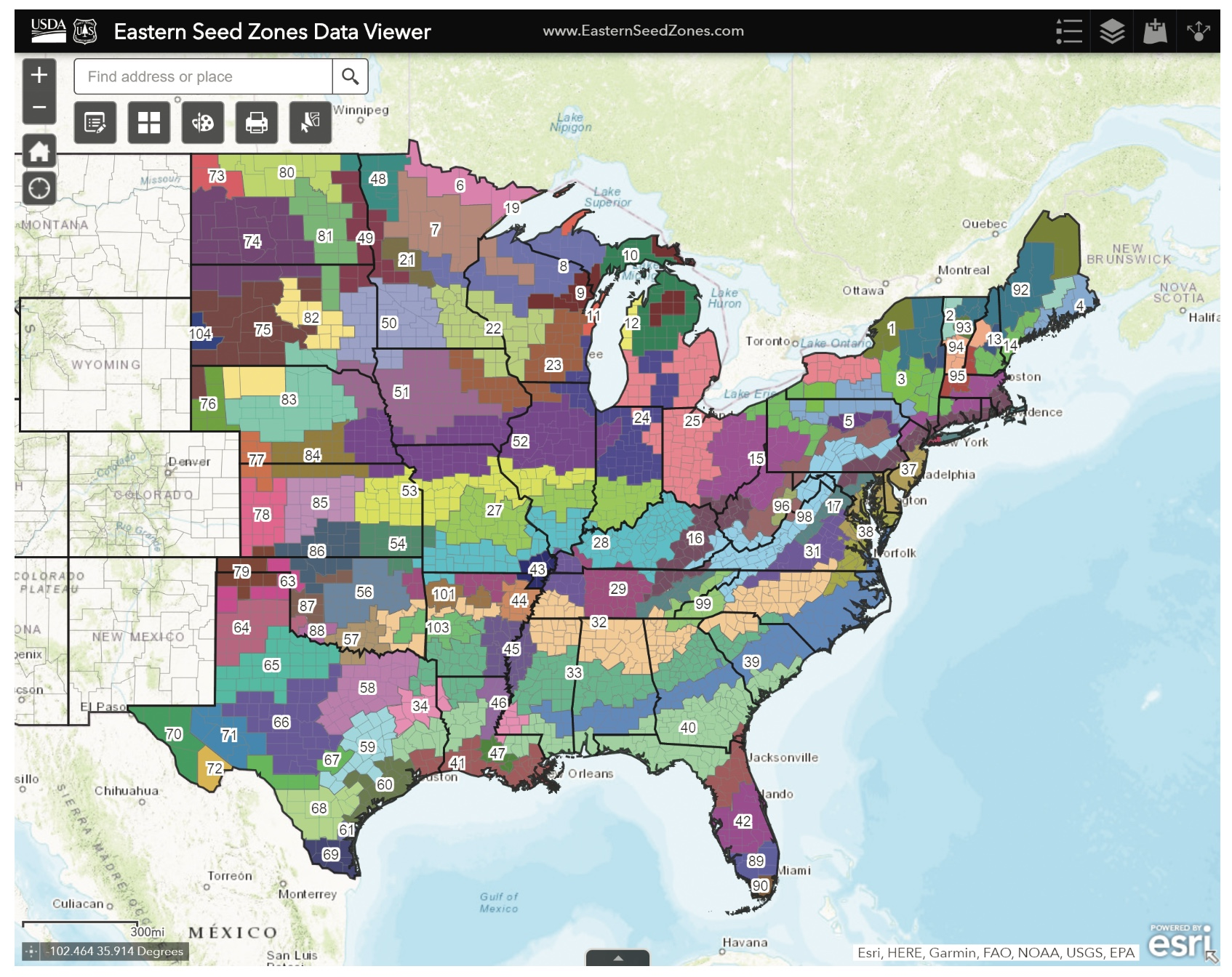
Established seed transfer zones in the east coast of the US, by the Eastern Seed Zone Forum (a unit of the US Forest Service)

=== Seed transfer guidelines ===
The use of provenancing is important for seed transfer guidelines in the field of forestry and ecological restoration, as it is important to match planting sites with well-adapted seed provenances to develop healthy, productive plantings. Seed transfer guidelines establish general rules that apply when planting on sites where the species naturally occurs, but may also establish rules for specific species. They also establish seed transfer zones, which are areas within which plant materials can be transferred with little risk of maladaptation due to climatic similarities. Seed transfer zones consider the distinctive habitats that are found within the range of a species, and are divided up based on this since certain individuals within the species are better suited for that site. They may also consider genetic differences among populations, assuming that local populations are best adapted to their local environment. The size of a tree seed zone can range from a few thousand acres to many thousand square miles since differences in topography influence the quantity of environmental heterogeneity seen in an area.

Historically, tree seed zone maps were based on climatic, topographic, and vegetative information, assigning the general transfer guidelines and seed zones to all species. However, it is now recognized that species differ in their response to general seed zones due to genetic differences and environmental influences. For example, forest tree species exhibit large genetic differences in survival, growth rate, frost hardiness, and other traits. Thus, tree seed zones and transfer guidelines are now assigned for specific forest tree species by the US Forest Service, in addition to general guidelines that apply when planting on seed zones where the species naturally occurs.

=== Development of seed transfer zones ===
Because it is difficult to gather comprehensive geo-genetic data for each species used in a restoration project due to time and resource constraints, there are different types of seed transfer zones developed for restoration projects. Some types of seed transfer zones broadly apply to all plant species, while others apply to a specific species if enough data is available. Of these types of seed transfer zones are provisional, climate-matched, and empirical seed transfer zones.

==== Provisional seed transfer zones ====
Provisional seed transfer zones are the most generalized seed zones, and can be applied to any plant species to guide seed plantings; they are used when there is not any genetic information available for a species of interest. They use geospatial climate data to derive regions of relative climatic similarity, predicting regions of local adaptation across a climate gradient.

==== Climate-based seed transfer zones ====
Climate-based seed transfer zones provide species-specific guidance for seed zones, utilizing both species-distribution models and climatic information to predict the relative performance of seed at the target site. Because these seed transfer zones apply to specific species, they can decrease the number of estimated seed sources per species needed, helping managers balance both ecological and economic considerations.

==== Empirical seed transfer zones ====
Empirical seed transfer zones are the most accurate seed transfer zones for species-specific guidance since are derived from empirical data gathered from field-based experiments. In the development of these seed zones, provenance trials are used to identify provenances that are well-adapted to the target region, which are common-garden experiments that evaluate plants for morphology, phenology, production, and physiological related traits. With this data, statistical analyses are applied to develop models that link genetic variation across the target region, allowing seed zones to be assigned.
