= Xin Luna Dong =

Chinese-American computer scientist

Xin Luna Dong is a Chinese-American computer scientist and database researcher whose research topics include knowledge graphs, knowledge fusion, and intelligent assistants. She is a principal scientist at Meta Reality Labs.

== Education and career ==
Dong studied computer science and international finance at Nankai University in Tianjin, China, graduating with a bachelor's degree in 1998. After a master's degree in computer science in 2001 at Peking University, she came to the University of Washington for doctoral study in computer science, earning a second master's degree in 2003 and completing her Ph.D. in 2007. Her dissertation, Providing Best Effort Services in Dataspace Systems, concerned databases and was supervised by Alon Halevy.

She became a researcher for AT&T Research from 2007 to 2012, for Google from 2013 to 2016, and for Amazon from 2016 to 2021, before taking her present position at Meta in 2021. Her work at Google and Amazon involved the Google Knowledge Graph and Amazon Product Knowledge Graph, respectively.

== Recognition ==
Dong was the 2016 recipient of the VLDB Early Career Award, "for advancing the state of the art of knowledge fusion". She is the 2023 recipient of the VLDB Women in Database Research Award.

She was named an IEEE Fellow, in the 2024 class of fellows, "for contributions to knowledge graph construction and data integration". She was named as an ACM Fellow, in the 2023 class of fellows, with the same citation.
