= The Jolly Mon =

Book by Jimmy Buffett and Savannah Jane Buffett

First edition

The Jolly Mon is a children's picture book written by Jimmy Buffett and Savannah Jane Buffett and published by Harcourt Brace Jovanovich. The book was originally released in 1988. It was illustrated by Lambert Davis. The plot heavily draws from the Greek myth of Arion.

From the cover flap, "A superb songwriter and storyteller, Jimmy Buffett has combined his knowledge of oceanic folklore with his own experiences while sailing with his daughter, Savannah Jane, from island to island throughout the Caribbean. The result is The Jolly Mon - an original tale where music and enchantment, pirates and trickery, friendship and the loyalty of a very special dolphin, create a timeless story of adventure. Dramatic paintings by Lambert Davis reflect the artist's continuing love of the sun, the surf, and the sea. Many of the visual elements in these illustrations were suggested to the artist by Jimmy Buffett, who related many details of his own experiences while living among the people of the Caribbean. Here is a book to be shared and treasured by young and old."

The original hard cover release of the book was accompanied by a cassette tape of Jimmy Buffett and Savannah Jane Buffett reading the story along with an original score written by Michael Utley. The musicians performing the score were Michael Utley (Piano), Robert Greenidge (Steel Pan), and Ira Ingber (Guitar).

Later editions of the book are accompanied by a CD recording of Jimmy and Savannah reading it.

Buffett was inspired to title this book after his famous song Jolly Mon Sing from his 1985 album, Last Mango in Paris.

The script writer of the Pirates of the Caribbean: Curse of the Black Pearl, Terry Rossio, credits the title of this book for the inspiration of the name for the little ship that Jack Sparrow sinks in the opening of the film.
