= Derek H. Sleeman =

Derek Sleeman
- Scientific career
- Fields: Artificial Intelligence; Cognitive Science; Machine Learning; Expert Systems; Biomedical Informatics
- Workplaces: University of Aberdeen; Stanford University; University of Leeds; University of Glasgow

Derek H. Sleeman is emeritus professor of computing science at the University of Aberdeen, Scotland (since 2008), and visiting professor, in the School of Medicine and the University of Glasgow (since 2009). He is a Fellow of the Royal Society of Edinburgh (1992), the British Computer Society (1995), and the European AI Society (2004).

Sleeman began his career as a lecturer in computing at the University of Leeds and co-founded the Computer-Based Learning Unit there in 1969. This led to his interest in intelligent tutoring systems and an edited volume on that subject with John Seely Brown. He moved to Stanford University in 1982, where he was an associate professor of AI & education, and senior research associate in the Knowledge Systems Laboratory of the Stanford Computer Science Department. Sleeman returned to Aberdeen in 1986, where he was appointed the university’s first professor of computing science.

Sleeman's research activities have remained at the intersection of AI and cognitive science, but his focus has moved from intelligent tutoring systems to co-operative knowledge acquisition and knowledge refinement systems, reuse and transformation of knowledge sources, and ontology management systems.

Sleeman has been a program committee member for the International European National Conferences in Machine Learning & Knowledge Acquisition, and involved in all the KCAP series of meetings; and was the conference chair for the 2007 meeting held in Whistler, British Columbia. Further, with Mark Musen, Sleeman organized one of the 2008 AAAI Stanford Spring Symposia entitled: Symbiotic relationship between the Semantic Web & Knowledge Engineering. He has also served on various editorial boards, including the Machine Learning Journal and the International Journal of Human-Computer Studies. He was one of the principal investigators of the EPSRC-sponsored IRC in Advanced Knowledge Technologies (2000–2007), and PI of the DTI/Rolls-Royce sponsored IPAS project (2005–2008).

Sleeman has a track record of interdisciplinary research work with education, engineering, science and medicine. As well as developing some early medical CAI programs whilst in Leeds, he also developed a Bayesian system (with Tim de Dombal) to diagnose abdominal pain. At Stanford he collaborated with Edward Shortliffe and Bill Clancey (developers respectively of the MYCIN & neo-MYCIN systems). Since returning to Scotland he has collaborated in Aberdeen with Anesthetics, ICU, General Practice, Oncology, & Respiratory Medicine Departments, and in Edinburgh (Neuro ICU, Western General Hospital).

Currently the focus of his work is with the Dialysis Unit at Aberdeen/Elgin Hospitals, and with the ICU at Glasgow Royal Infirmary. In both these activities Sleeman's team is analysing patient datasets produced and have developed an infrastructure which supports the analyst/clinician in preparing datasets to investigate various clinically led hypotheses.
