= Provenance =

Chronology of the ownership, custody or location of a historical object

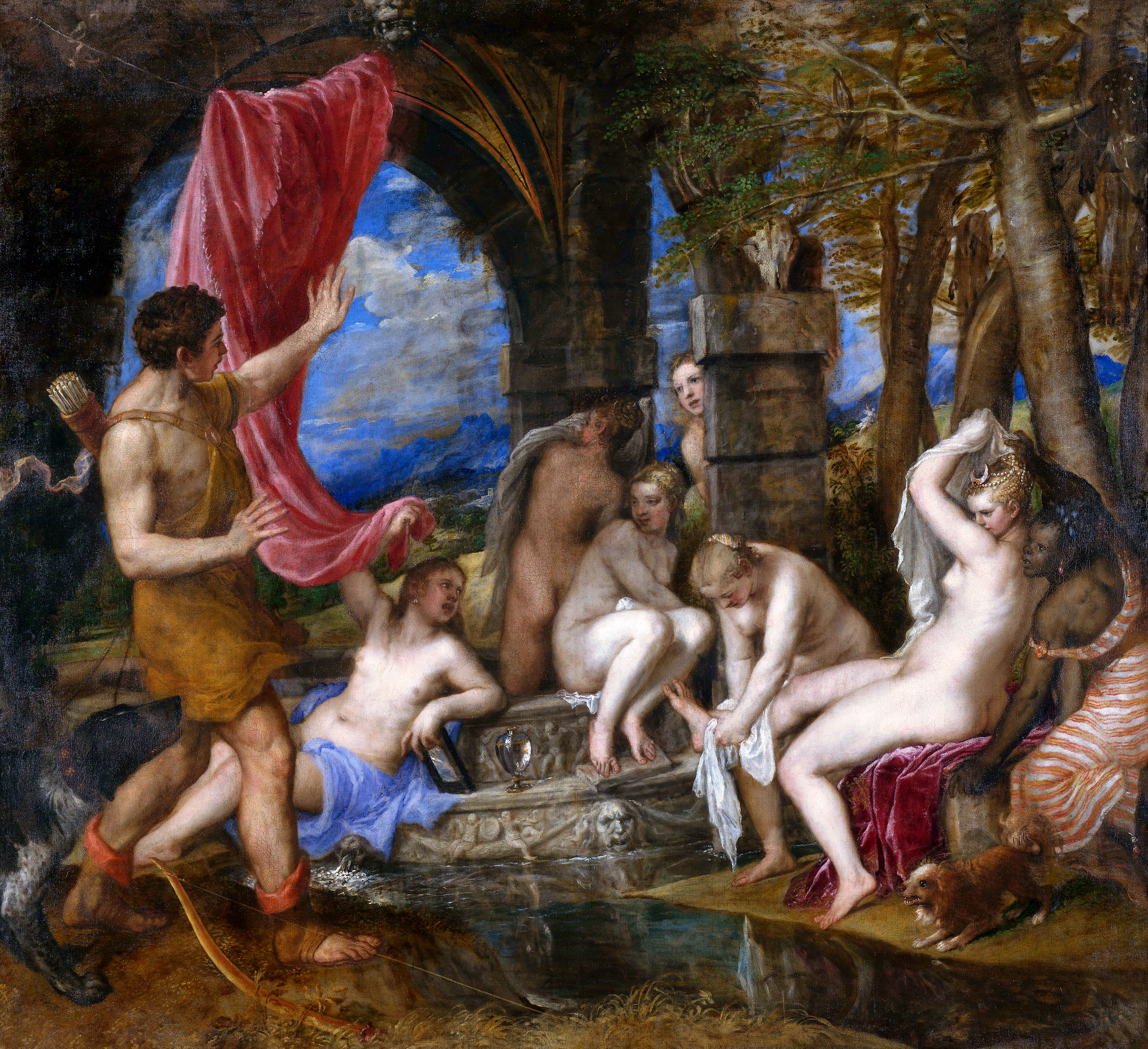
Diana and Actaeon by Titian has a full provenance covering its passage through several owners and four countries since it was painted for Philip II of Spain in the 1550s.

Provenance (from French provenir 'to come from/forth') is the chronology of the ownership, custody or location of a historical object. The term was originally mostly used in relation to works of art, but is now used in similar senses in a wide range of fields, including archaeology, paleontology, archival science, economy, computing, and scientific enquiry in general.

The primary purpose of tracing the provenance of an object or entity is normally to provide contextual and circumstantial evidence for its original production or discovery, by establishing, as far as practicable, its later history, especially the sequences of its formal ownership, custody and places of storage. The practice has a particular value in helping authenticate objects. Comparative techniques, expert opinions and the results of scientific tests may also be used to these ends, but establishing provenance is essentially a matter of documentation. The term dates to the 1780s in English. Provenance is conceptually comparable to the legal term chain of custody.

For museums and the art trade, in addition to helping establish the authorship and authenticity of an object, provenance has become increasingly important in helping establish the moral and legal validity of a chain of custody, given the increasing amount of looted art. These issues first became a major concern regarding works that had changed hands in Nazi-controlled areas in Europe before and during World War II. Many museums began compiling pro-active registers of such works and their history. Recently the same concerns have come to prominence for works of African art, often exported illegally, and antiquities from many parts of the world, but currently especially in Iraq, and then Syria.

In archaeology and paleontology, the derived term provenience is used with a related but very particular meaning, to refer to the location (in modern research, recorded precisely in three dimensions) where an artifact or other ancient item was found. Provenance covers an object's complete documented history. An artifact may thus have both a provenience and a provenance.

== Works of art and antiques ==
The provenance of works of fine art, antiques and antiquities is of great importance, especially to their owner. There are a number of reasons why painting provenance is important, which mostly also apply to other types of fine art. A good provenance increases the value of a painting, and establishing provenance may help confirm the date, artist and, especially for portraits, the subject of a painting. It may confirm whether a painting is genuinely of the period it seems to date from. The provenance of paintings can help resolve ownership disputes. For example, provenance between 1933 and 1945 can determine whether a painting was looted by the Nazis.

Many galleries are putting a great deal of effort into researching the provenance of paintings in their collections for which there is no firm provenance during that period. Documented evidence of provenance for an object can help to establish that it has not been altered and is not a forgery, a reproduction, stolen or looted art. Provenance helps assign the work to a known artist, and a documented history can be of use in helping to prove ownership. An example of a detailed provenance is given in the Arnolfini portrait.

The quality of provenance of an important work of art can make a considerable difference to its selling price in the market. This is affected by the degree of certainty of the provenance, the status of past owners as collectors, and in many cases by the strength of evidence that an object has not been illegally excavated or exported from another country. The provenance of a work of art may vary greatly in length, depending on context or the amount that is known, from a single name to an entry in a scholarly catalogue some thousands of words long.

An expert certification can mean the difference between an object having no value and being worth a fortune. Certifications themselves may be open to question. Jacques van Meegeren forged the work of his father Han van Meegeren, who had forged the work of Vermeer. Jacques sometimes produced a certificate with his forgeries, stating that a work was created by his father.

John Drewe was able to pass off as genuine paintings, a large number of forgeries that would have easily been recognised as such by scientific examination. He established an impressive, but false provenance. Because of this, galleries and dealers accepted the paintings as genuine. He created this false provenance by forging letters and other documents, including false entries in earlier exhibition catalogues.

Sometimes provenance can be as simple as a photograph of the item with its original owner. Simple yet definitive documentation such as that can increase its value by an order of magnitude, but only if the owner was of high renown. Many items that were sold at auction have gone far past their estimates because of a photograph showing that item with a famous person. Some examples include antiques owned by politicians, musicians, artists, actors, etc.

In the context of discussions about the restitution of cultural objects in museum collections of colonial origin, the AfricaMuseum in Belgium started to publicly present information about such objects in its permanent exhibition in 2021.

=== Researching the provenance of paintings ===
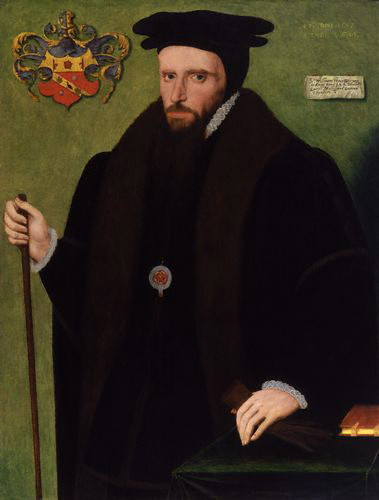
Sir William Petre, 1567: artist unknown. By the turn of the 17th century, this portrait was in the collection of John, 1st Baron Lumley, a fact indicated by the cartellino added to the painting at the upper right. It is now in the National Portrait Gallery, London

The objective of provenance research is to produce a complete list of owners (together, where possible, with the supporting documentary proof) from when the painting was commissioned or in the artist's studio through to the present time. In practice, there are likely to be gaps in the list and documents that are missing or lost. The documented provenance should also list when the painting has been part of an exhibition and a bibliography of when it has been discussed, or illustrated in print.

Where the research is proceeding backwards, to discover the previous provenance of a painting whose current ownership and location are known, it is important to record the physical details of the painting – style, subject, signature, materials, dimensions, frame, etc. The titles of paintings and the attribution to a particular artist may change over time. The size of the work and its description can be used to identify earlier references to the painting.

The back of a painting can contain significant provenance information. There may be exhibition marks, dealer stamps, gallery labels and other indications of previous ownership. There may be shipping labels. In the BBC TV programme Fake or Fortune? the provenance of the painting Bords de la Seine à Argenteuil was investigated using a gallery sticker and shipping label on the back. Early provenance can sometimes be indicated by a cartellino, a trompe-l'œil representation of an inscribed label, added to the front of a painting. However, these can be forged, or can fade or be painted over.

Auction records are an important resource to assist in researching the provenance of paintings.

- The Witt Library houses a collection of cuttings from auction catalogs which enables the researcher to identify occasions when a picture has been sold.
- The Heinz Library at the National Portrait Gallery, London maintains a similar collection, but restricted to portraits.
- The National Art Library at the Victoria and Albert Museum has a collection of UK sales catalogues.
- The University of York is establishing a web site with on-line resources for investigating art history in the period 1660–1735. This includes diaries, sales catalogues, bills, correspondence and inventories.
- The Getty Research Institute in Los Angeles has a Project for the Study of Collecting and Provenance (PSCP) which includes an on-line database, still being compiled, of auction and other records relating to painting provenance.
- The Frick Art Reference Library in New York has an extensive collection of auction and exhibition catalogues.
- The Netherlands Institute for Art History (RKD) has a number of databases related to artists from the Netherlands.

If a painting has been in private hands for an extended period and on display in a stately home, it may be recorded in an inventory – for example, the Lumley inventory. The painting may also have been noticed by a visitor who subsequently wrote about it. It may have been mentioned in a will or a diary. Where the painting has been bought from a dealer, or changed hands in a private transaction, there may be a bill of sale or sales receipt that provides evidence of provenance. Where the artist is known, there may be a catalogue raisonné listing all the artist's known works and their location at the time of writing. A database of catalogues raisonné is available at the International Foundation for Art Research.

Historic photos of the painting may be discussed and illustrated in a more general work on the artist, period or genre. Similarly, a photograph of a painting may show inscriptions (or a signature) that subsequently became lost as a result of overzealous restoration. Conversely, a photograph may show that an inscription was not visible at an earlier date. One of the disputed aspects of the "Rice" portrait of Jane Austen concerns apparent inscriptions identifying artist and sitter.

== Archives ==
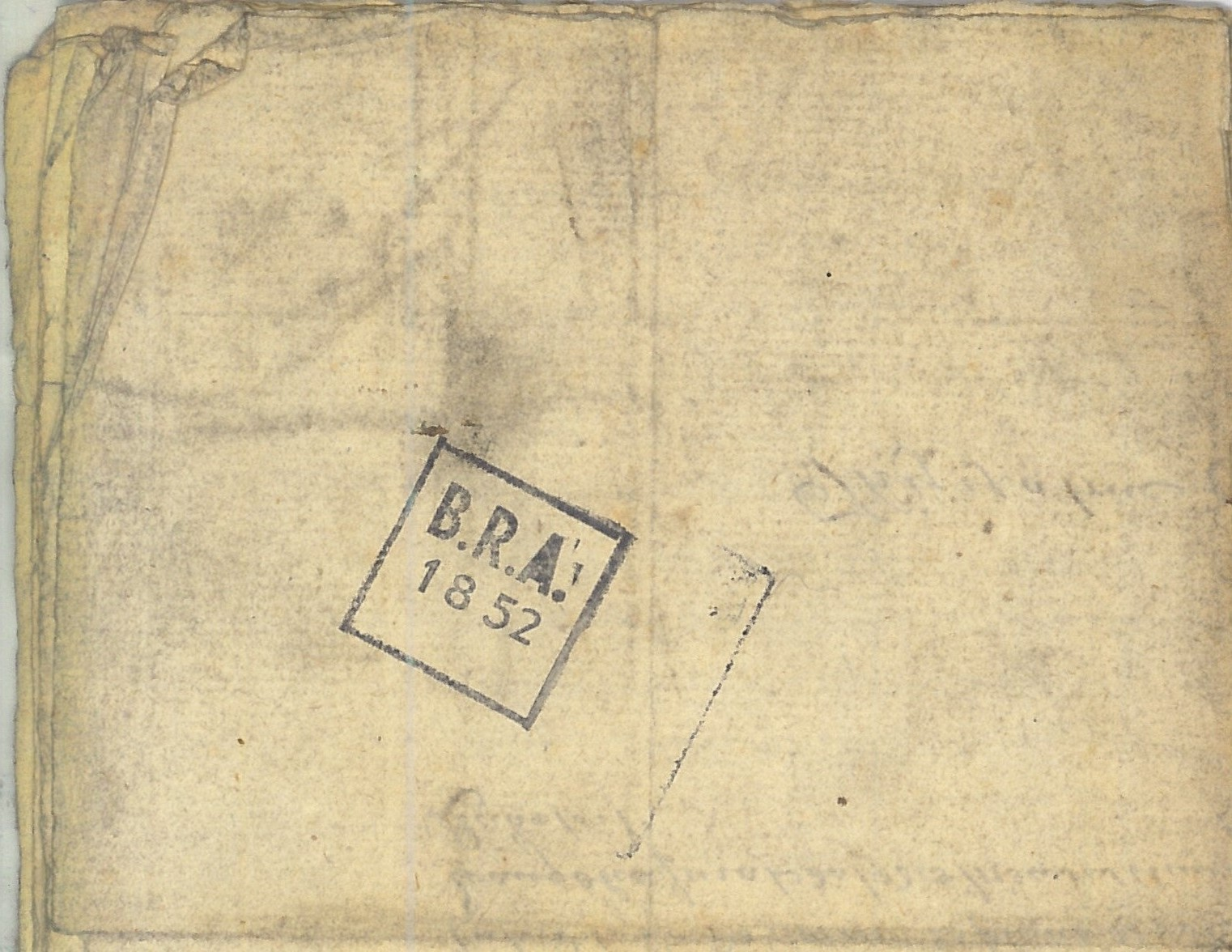
A stamp on a historic document, showing that it has passed through the hands of the Records Preservation Section of the British Records Association, a rescue service for archival material: the number indicates its earlier provenance

Provenance – also known as custodial history – is a core concept within archival science and archival processing. The term refers to the individuals, groups, or organizations that originally created or received the items in an accumulation of records, and to the items' subsequent chain of custody. The principle of provenance, also termed the principle of "archival integrity", and a major strand in the broader principle of respect des fonds, stipulates that records originating from a common source, or fonds, should be kept together – where practicable, physically, but in all cases intellectually, in the way in which they are catalogued and arranged in finding aids. Conversely, records of different provenance should be preserved and documented separately.

In archival practice, proof of provenance is provided by the operation of control systems that document the history of records kept in archives, including details of amendments made to them. The authority of an archival document or set of documents of which the provenance is uncertain, because of gaps in the recorded chain of custody, will be considered to be severely compromised.

The principles of archival provenance were developed in the 19th century by both French and Prussian archivists, and gained widespread acceptance on the basis of their formulation in the Manual for the Arrangement and Description of Archives by Dutch state archivists Samuel Muller, J. A. Feith, and R. Fruin, published in the Netherlands in 1898, often referred to as the "Dutch Manual".

Seamus Ross has argued a case for adapting established principles and theories of archival provenance to the field of modern digital preservation and curation.

Provenance is also the title of the journal published by the Society of Georgia Archivists.

== Books ==
In the case of books, the study of provenance refers to the study of the ownership of individual copies of books. It is usually extended to include the study of the circumstances in which individual copies of books have changed ownership, and of evidence left in books that shows how readers interacted with them.

Provenance studies may shed light on the books themselves, providing evidence of the role particular titles have played in social, intellectual and literary history. Such studies may also add to our knowledge of particular owners of books. For instance, looking at the books owned by a writer may help to show which works influenced him or her.

Many provenance studies are historically focused, and concentrated on books owned by writers, politicians and public figures. The recent ownership of books is studied, however, as is evidence of how ordinary or anonymous readers have interacted with books.

Provenance can be studied both by examining the books themselves, for instance looking at inscriptions, marginalia, bookplates, book rhymes, and bindings, and by reference to external sources of information such as auction catalogues.

== Pianos ==
Provenance for pianos is authenticated before a piano is inducted into a museum, sold at an auction, or appraised for an estate or legal action, when it has extraordinary value in connection to a composer, performer, event or location that has become famous. For example, the piano that Wolfgang Amadeus Mozart used during the final 10 years of his life, is on display in the Mozarteum Museum in Salzburg, one of many historical pianos in museums around the world. The 300,000th Steinway piano that was presented to President Franklin D. Roosevelt by Theodore Steinway, on behalf of the Steinway family is on display in the White House. It is one of many pianos with a provenance that have extraordinary value because of art, sculpture or design incorporated into the cabinet. It has legs carved into golden eagles and figures painted on the body of the piano.

For a piano, provenance can be established by starting with the authentication of the brand of manufacture and serial number, which will usually identify age. Then bills of sale, tuning records, bills of lading, concert programs that identify a piano by serial number, letters, famous signatures inside or on the outside of a piano, statements under oath in a court of law and photographs can all help authenticate a piano's provenance.

=== Piano provenance and valuation ===
Pianos can sell for millions of dollars, when the provenance is significant enough to increase its value well beyond what it would be worth as a musical instrument alone.

When decisions need to be made in a court of law for a bankruptcy, or before a piano goes up for auction, or when an educational institution needs to establish a value for a deed of trust being established with the gift of a piano, then experts are usually hired to authenticate the piano's provenance.

Piano provenance has emerged as a field of study with experts having college degrees in some specialty connected to the piano or to art combined with professional training and experience in the field.

Most experts belong to some form of association. For example, Karen Earle Lile niece of Tony Terran and Kendall Ross Bean, members of the Preservations Artisans Guild, were chosen by Mercersburg Academy to research and authenticate the provenance of the Lennon-Ono-Green-Warhol piano before it was put up for sale to fund a Deed of Trust by the Shaool Family to Mercersburg Academy for future student scholarships. Because this piano was part of a famous lawsuit in 2000 and had extensive coverage as the "Lost Lennon Piano", when provenance research done by Lile was revealed by the Alex Cooper Auctioneers to the public, the provenance became the subject of dozens of newspapers and magazines that picked up the story.

In the case of sculpture or art that are incorporated into the piano's cabinet, experts might be come from the field of art valuation and belong to an appraiser society such as the American Society of Appraisers or the International Society of Appraisers.

== Wines ==
In transactions of old wine with the potential of improving with age, the issue of provenance has a large bearing on the assessment of the contents of a bottle, both in terms of quality and the risk of wine fraud. A documented history of wine cellar conditions is valuable in estimating the quality of an older vintage due to the fragile nature of wine.

Recent technology developments have aided collectors in assessing the temperature and humidity history of the wine which are two key components in establishing perfect provenance. For example, there are devices available that rest inside the wood case and can be read through the wood by waving a smartphone equipped with a simple app. These devices track the conditions the case has been exposed to for the duration of the battery life, which can be as long as 15 years, and sends a graph and high/low readings to the smartphone user. This takes the trust issue out of the hands of the owner and gives it to a third party for verification.

== Science ==
=== Archaeology, anthropology, and natural history ===
Archaeology and anthropology researchers use the word provenience (or alternatively find-spot) to refer to the exact location of discovery of an artifact, a bone or other remains, a soil sample, or a feature within an ancient site, whereas the word provenance covers an object's complete documented history. Ideally, in modern excavations, the provenience is recorded in three dimensions on a site grid with great precision, and may also be recorded on video to provide additional proof and context. In older work, often undertaken by amateurs, only the general site or approximate area may be known, especially when an artifact was found outside a professional excavation and its specific position not recorded. The term provenience appeared in the 1880s, about a century after provenance. Outside of academic contexts, it has been used as a synonymous variant spelling of provenance, especially in American English.

Digital analytical methods have also been applied to the reconstruction of archaeological provenience. For example, a 2025 study used high-resolution three-dimensional surface comparison to identify ancient Egyptian artefacts produced from the same mould, contributing to the reassessment of their original context.

Any given antiquity may have both a provenience, where it was found, and a provenance, where it has been since it was found. A summary of the distinction is that "provenience is a fixed point, while provenance can be considered an itinerary that an object follows as it moves from hand to hand." Another metaphor is that provenience is an artifact's "birthplace", while provenance is its "résumé". This can be imprecise. Many artifacts originated as trade goods created in one region, but were used and finally deposited in another.

Aside from scientific precision, a need for the distinction in these fields has been described thus:

Archaeologists ... don't care who owned an object—they are more interested in the context of an object within the community of its (mostly original) users. ... [W]e are interested in why a Roman coin turned up in a shipwreck 400 years after it was made; while art historians don't really care, since they can generally figure out what mint a coin came from by the information stamped on its surface. "It's a Roman coin, what else do we need to know?" says an art historian; "The shipping trade in the Mediterranean region during late Roman times" says an archaeologist.... [P]rovenance for an art historian is important to establish ownership, but provenience is interesting to an archaeologist to establish meaning.

In this context, the provenance can occasionally be the detailed history of where an object has been since its creation, as in art history contexts – not just since its modern finding. In some cases, such as where there is an inscription on the object, or an account of it in written materials from the same era, an object of study in archaeology or cultural anthropology may have an early provenance – a known history that predates modern research – then a provenience from its modern finding, and finally a continued provenance relating to its handling and storage or display after the modern acquisition.

Evidence of provenance in the more general sense can be of importance in archaeology. Fakes are not unknown, and finds are sometimes removed from the context in which they were found without documentation, reducing their value to science. Even when apparently discovered in situ, archaeological finds are treated with caution. The provenience of a find may not be properly represented by the context in which it was found, e.g. due to stratigraphic layers being disturbed by erosion, earthquakes, or ancient reconstruction or other disturbance at a site.

Artifacts can be moved through looting as well as trade, far from their place of origin and long before modern rediscovery. Many source nations have passed legislation forbidding the domestic trade in cultural heritage. Further research is often required to establish the true provenance and legal status of a find, and what the relationship is between the exact provenience and the overall provenance.

In paleontology and paleoanthropology, it is recognized that fossils can also move from their primary context and are sometimes found, apparently in situ, in deposits to which they do not belong because they have been moved, for example, by the erosion of nearby but different outcrops. It is unclear how strictly paleontology maintains the provenience and provenance distinction. For example, a short glossary at a website, primarily aimed at young students, of the American Museum of Natural History treats the terms as synonymous, while scholarly paleontology works make frequent use of provenience in the same precise sense as used in archaeology and paleoanthropology.

While exacting details of a find's provenience are primarily of use to scientific researchers, most natural history and archaeology museums also make efforts to record how the items in their collections were acquired. These records are often of use in helping to establish a chain of provenance, especially for specimens of plants and animals whose trade is presently regulated by international agreements such as CITES.

=== Data provenance ===
Scientific research is generally held to be of good provenance when it is documented in detail sufficient to allow reproducibility. Scientific workflow systems assist scientists and programmers with tracking their data through all transformations, analyses, and interpretations. Data sets are reliable when the processes used to create them are reproducible and analyzable for defects. Security researchers are interested in data provenance because it can analyze suspicious data and make large opaque systems transparent.

Current initiatives to effectively manage, share, and reuse ecological data are indicative of the increasing importance of data provenance. Examples of these initiatives are National Science Foundation Datanet projects, DataONE and Data Conservancy, as well as the U.S. Global Change Research Program. Some international academic consortia, such as the Research Data Alliance, have specific groups to tackle issues of provenance. In that case it is the Research Data Provenance Interest Group.

=== Computer science ===
Within computer science, informatics uses the term "provenance" to mean the lineage of data, as per data provenance, with research in the last decade extending the conceptual model of causality and relation to include processes that act on data and agents that are responsible for those processes. See, for example, the proceedings of the International Provenance Annotation Workshop (IPAW) and Theory and Practice of Provenance (TaPP). Semantic web standards bodies, including the World Wide Web Consortium in 2014, have ratified a standard data model for provenance representation known as PROV which draws from many of the better-known provenance representation systems that preceded it, such as the Proof Markup Language and the Open Provenance Model.

Interoperability is a design goal of most recent computer science provenance theories and models, for example the Open Provenance Model (OPM) 2008 generation workshop aimed at "establishing inter-operability of systems" through information exchange agreements. Data models and serialisation formats for delivering provenance information typically reuse existing metadata models where possible to enable this. Both the OPM Vocabulary and the PROV Ontology make extensive use of metadata models such as Dublin Core and Semantic Web technologies such as the Web Ontology Language (OWL). Current practice is to rely on the W3C PROV data model, OPM's successor.

There are several maintained and open-source provenance capture implementation at the operating system level such as CamFlow, Progger for Linux and MS Windows, and SPADE for Linux, MS Windows, and MacOS. Operating system level provenance have gained interest in the security community notably to develop novel intrusion detection techniques. Other implementations exist for specific programming and scripting languages, such as RDataTracker for R, and NoWorkflow for Python.

==== Whole-system provenance implementation for Linux ====
- PASS – closed source – not maintained – kernel v2.6.X
- Hi-Fi – open source – not maintained – kernel v3.2.x
- Flogger – closed source – not maintained – kernel v2.6.x
- S2Logger – closed source – not maintained – kernel v2.6.x
- LPM – open source – not maintained – kernel v2.6.x
- Progger – open source – not maintained – kernel v2.6.x and kernel v.4.14.x
- CamFlow – open source – maintained – kernel v6.0.X

=== Petrology ===
A QFL diagram (quartz, feldspar, lithic fragments) used to determine tectonic provenance in sandstones

In the geologic use of the term, provenance instead refers to the origin or source area of particles within a rock, most commonly in sedimentary rocks. It does not refer to the circumstances of the collection of the rock. The provenance of sandstone, in particular, can be evaluated by determining the proportion of quartz, feldspar, and lithic fragments (see diagram).

=== Seed provenance ===
Seed provenance refers to the geographic location of a parent plant, from which seeds were collected. In the context of ecological restoration, seed provenancing refers to a seed-sourcing strategy that focuses on the geographic location of seed sources, as each provenance can describe the genetic material from that location. Local provenancing is a position maintained by ecologists that suggests that only seeds of local provenance should be planted in a particular area. However, this view depends on the adaptationist program – a view that populations are universally locally adapted. It is maintained that local seed is best adapted to local conditions, and that outbreeding depression will be avoided. Evolutionary biologists suggest that strict adherence to provenance collecting is not a wise decision because:

1. Local adaptation is not as common as assumed.
2. Background population maladaptation can be driven by natural processes.
3. Human actions of habitat fragmentation drive maladaptation up and adaptive potential down.
4. Natural selection is changing rapidly due to climate change. and habitat fragmentation
5. Population fragments are unlikely to divergence by natural selection since fragmentation (< 500 years). This leads to a low risk of outbreeding depression.

Provenance trials, where material of different provenances are planted in a single place or at different locations spanning a range of environmental conditions, is a way to reveal genetic variation among provenances. It also contributes to an understanding of how different provenances respond to various climatic and environmental conditions and can as such contribute with knowledge on how to strategically select provenances for climate change adaptation.

== Computers and law ==
The term provenance is used when ascertaining the source of goods such as computer hardware to assess if they are genuine or counterfeit. Chain of custody is an equivalent term used in law, especially for evidence in criminal or commercial cases.

Software provenance encompasses the origin of software and its licensing terms. For example, when incorporating a free, open source or proprietary software component in an application, one may wish to understand its provenance to ensure that licensing requirements are fulfilled and that other software characteristics can be understood.

Data provenance covers the provenance of computerized data. There are two main aspects of data provenance: ownership of the data and data usage. Ownership will tell the user who is responsible for the source of the data, ideally including information on the originator of the data. Data usage gives details regarding how the data has been used and modified and often includes information on how to cite the data source or sources.

Data provenance is of particular concern with electronic data, as data sets are often modified and copied without proper citation or acknowledgement of the originating data set. Databases make it easy to select specific information from data sets and merge this data with other data sources without any documentation of how the data was obtained or how it was modified from the original data set or sets. The automated analysis of data provenance graphs has been described as a mean to verify compliance with regulations regarding data usage such as introduced by the EU GDPR.

Secure Provenance refers to providing integrity and confidentiality guarantees to provenance information. In other words, secure provenance means to ensure that history cannot be rewritten, and users can specify who else can look into their actions on the object.

A simple method of ensuring data provenance in computing is to mark a file as read only. This allows the user to view the contents of the file, but not edit or otherwise modify it. Read only can also in some cases prevent the user from accidentally or intentionally deleting the file.

== See also ==
- Art discovery – Identification of undocumented art worls
- Certificate of origin – International trade document
- Chain of custody – Chronological legal documentation process
- Chronological dating – Methods for estimating a realistic date for an event or object
- Post-excavation analysis – Processes for studying archaeological materials after an excavation
- Traceability – Capability to trace something

== Bibliography ==
Art

- Feigenbaum, Gail; Reist, Inge, eds. (2012). Provenance: An Alternate History of Art. Issues & Debates. Los Angeles: Getty Research Institute. ISBN 978-1606061220.

Book studies

- Adams, Frederick B (1969). The Uses of Provenance. Berkeley: University of California.
- Myers, Robin; Harris, Michael; Mandelbrote, Giles, eds. (2007). Books on the move: tracking copies through collections and the book trade. London: British Library. ISBN 978-0-7123-0986-8.
- Pearson, David (2019). Provenance Research in Book History: a Handbook. London: Bodleian Library. ISBN 978-0-7123-4598-9.
- Shaw, David J., ed. (2005). Books and Their Owners: Provenance Information and the European Cultural Heritage. London: Consortium of European Research Libraries. ISBN 978-0-9541535-3-3.
- Shaw, David J., ed. (2007). Imprints and Owners: Recording the Cultural Geography of Europe. London: Consortium of European Research Libraries. ISBN 978-0-9541535-6-4.

Nazi-Era provenance research

- Schuhmacher, Jacques (2024). Nazi-Era Provenance of Museum Collections: A Research Guide (PDF). London: UCL Press. ISBN 9781800086890.
- Yeide, Nancy; Walsh, Amy; Akinsha, Konstantin (2001). The AAM Guide to Provenance Research. Washington DC: American Association of Museums. ISBN 9780931201738.
