= Richard Fikes =

American artificial intelligence researcher

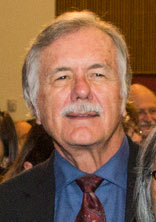
- Born: October 4, 1942 (age 83); San Antonio, Texas
- Education: Carnegie Mellon University
- Known for: STRIPS, Shakey the robot, KIF
- Awards: AAAI Fellow
- Scientific career
- Fields: Artificial intelligence, knowledge representation and reasoning
- Thesis: A Heuristic Program for Solving Problems Stated as Nondeterministic Procedures (1968)
- Doctoral advisor: Allen Newell
- Doctoral students: Alon Halevy, Satish Kumar Thittamaranahalli, Patrick Doyle, Karl Pfleger, Todd Neller
- Website: profiles.stanford.edu/richard-fikes

Richard Earl Fikes (born October 4, 1942) is a computer scientist and Professor (Research) Emeritus in the Computer Science department of Stanford University. He led Stanford's Knowledge Systems Laboratory from 1991 to 2006, and has held appointments at Berkeley, Carnegie-Mellon, Price Waterhouse Technology Centre, Xerox PARC, and SRI International.

== Early life and education ==
Fikes was born in Mobile, Alabama, and lived most of his early life in San Antonio, Texas. He graduated from Sam Houston High School (San Antonio, Texas) as valedictorian in 1960, received a B.A. degree in mathematics from the University of Texas at Austin in 1963, and received an M.A. degree in mathematics from the University of Texas at Austin in 1965. Fikes received his Ph.D. in computer science with a specialization in Artificial Intelligence from Carnegie Mellon University in 1968.

== Career ==
Before coming to Stanford, Fikes did seminal work in the development of automatic planning and plan execution monitoring systems for intelligent robots at SRI International’s Artificial Intelligence Center, developed knowledge-based system technology at Xerox Palo Alto Research Center (PARC), and led research groups at IntelliCorp Inc. and Price Waterhouse Technology Centre.

At Stanford, Fikes was an innovative leader in the development of techniques for effectively representing and using knowledge in computer systems. He led projects focused on developing large-scale distributed repositories of reusable computer-interpretable knowledge, collaborative development of multi-use ontologies, enabling technology for the Semantic Web, reasoning methods applicable to large-scale knowledge bases, and knowledge-based technology for intelligence analysts. He was principal investigator of major projects for multiple Federal Government agencies including the Defense Advanced Research Projects Agency (DARPA) and the Intelligence Community’s Advanced Research and Development Activity (ARDA).

Fikes retired from his positions of Professor (Research) in the Computer Science department of Stanford University and director of Stanford's Knowledge Systems Laboratory in 2006. He was given a retirement party that was a large gathering of early luminaries in the field of artificial intelligence. A video from that party showing tributes and a career reflections speech by Fikes can be found at https://www.youtube.com/watch?v=vl2XBb2uGLw.

Since retiring from Stanford, Fikes has been professionally active as a consultant on design and development of knowledge representation and reasoning technology, an expert witness in cases involving disputed patents of Artificial Intelligence technology, and a mentor of high school students learning how to do research. He has also been an interviewer of emeritus faculty for Stanford’s Oral History Program, and serves on the committee that provides oversight and guidance to the Oral History Program.

== Memberships and awards ==
Fikes has published numerous articles in journals and conference proceedings, and has also served as editor of several professional journals in artificial intelligence and related areas. Fikes has also chaired, co-chaired, organized, or served on the program committee of numerous professional conferences and symposia. In 1990 he was elected as a Founding Fellow of the Association for the Advancement of Artificial Intelligence.
