= Sleeman Centre (disambiguation) =

Sleeman Centre may refer to:

- Sleeman Centre, a sports and entertainment arena in Guelph, Ontario, Canada
- Sleeman Sports Centre, a former name of the Chandler Arena, Brisbane

== See also ==
- Sleeman Sports Complex, a sporting and entertainment complex in Brisbane, Queensland, Australia
