= Jean Raon =

French sculptor

- Born: 4 July 1630/1631; Paris, France
- Died: 4 April 1707 (aged 75–76); Paris, France
- Education: French Academy in Rome; Royal Academy of Painting and Sculpture
- Style: Classicism
- Movement: Baroque
- Children: Jean-Melchior Raon (1669–1719)

Jean Raon (4 July 1630 – 4 April 1707) was a French sculptor who worked mainly for Louis XIV. He is best known for his sculptures placed in the Gardens of Versailles, although he also produced bas-reliefs and pediments.

== Life ==
Jean Raon, the son of a master mason, was born in Paris, and first trained by his father; in 1666 he went to Rome to study art as a boarder at the French Academy in Rome at the King's expense, in the new study abroad programme supported by the Royal Academy of Painting and Sculpture. After studying Roman antiquities for three years, he returned to France to work at Versailles.

Raon would be continuously employed by Louis XIV to work on Charles Le Brun's major programme of sculpture, architecture and landscaping until 1699. He worked not only at Versailles but also at the royal buildings at Clagny, Marly and Meudon, as well as at the church of the Hôtel des Invalides.

Raon was accepted as a member of the Académie Royale on 26 March 1672 with St Luke, a marble low relief, and received the title of professor at the Academy in 1690. He exhibited at the Salon of the Académie in 1673 and 1679. In his last years he divided his time between teaching and sculpting for the royal residences.

== Works ==
Raon's works include: Apollo at the museum of Versailles; St Luke for a chapel in Notre-Dame, Versailles; Winter in the Tuileries gardens; Vigilance and Diligence, stone statues for the façade of the palace of Versailles and, on the exterior of its chapel, Group of Children Carrying the Emblems for the Catholic Mass, as well as a marble vase decorated with vine branches and two female heads crowned with ivy for the park; Nymph Leaning on an Urn of Flowers and Near Her, a Lover Holding a Quiver, a marble group for the palace of Versailles and for the grounds of the château, Lion Attacking a Boar, two groups of nymphs, Arion, Night and Bacchus.

== Son ==
Jean Melchior Raon (1669 – 27 December 1719) was the son of Jean Raon. He was also a sculptor and worked on the chapel in the palace of Versailles and at Notre-Dame in Paris.

Gardens of Versailles
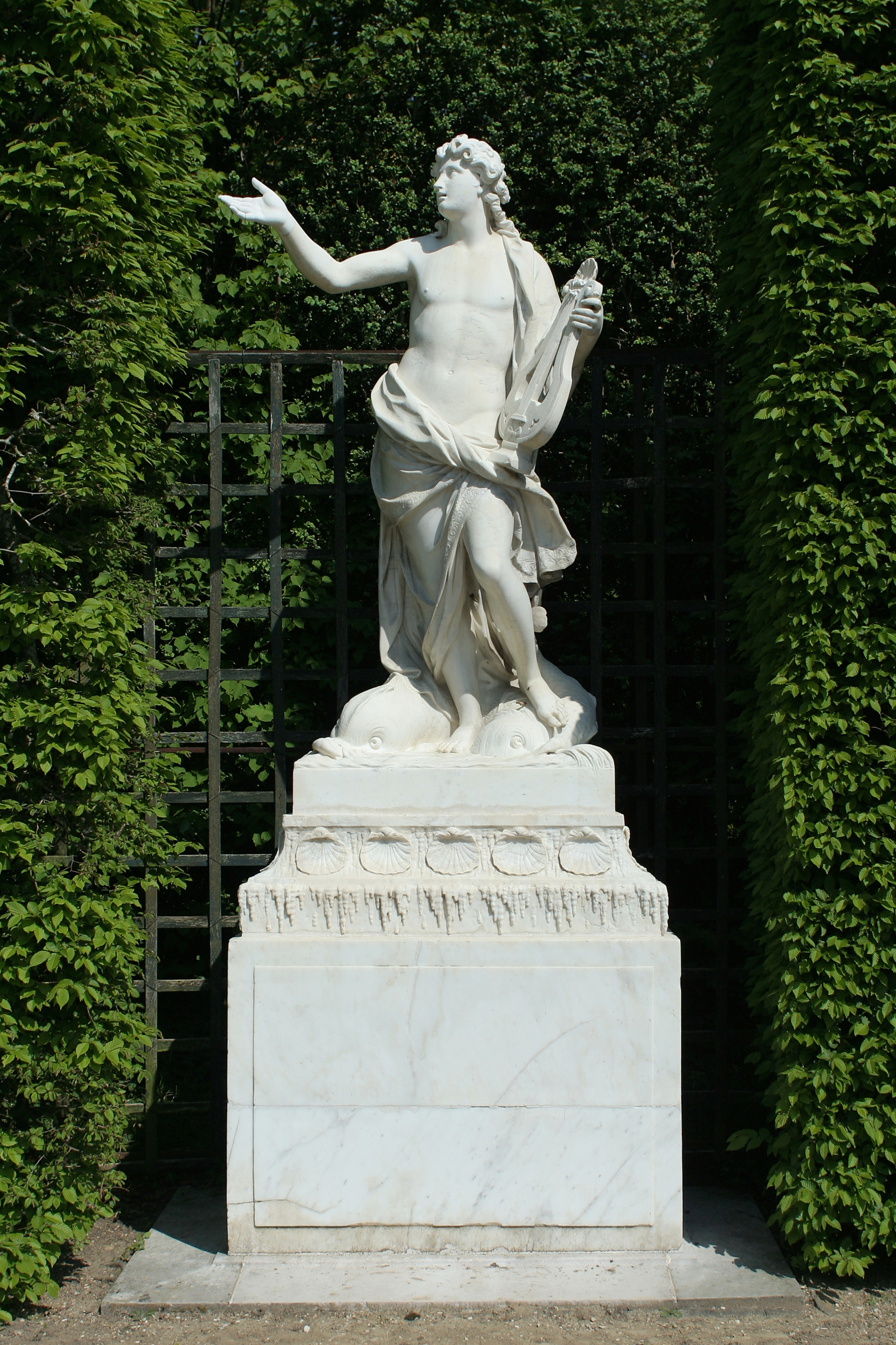
Arion with his Lyre

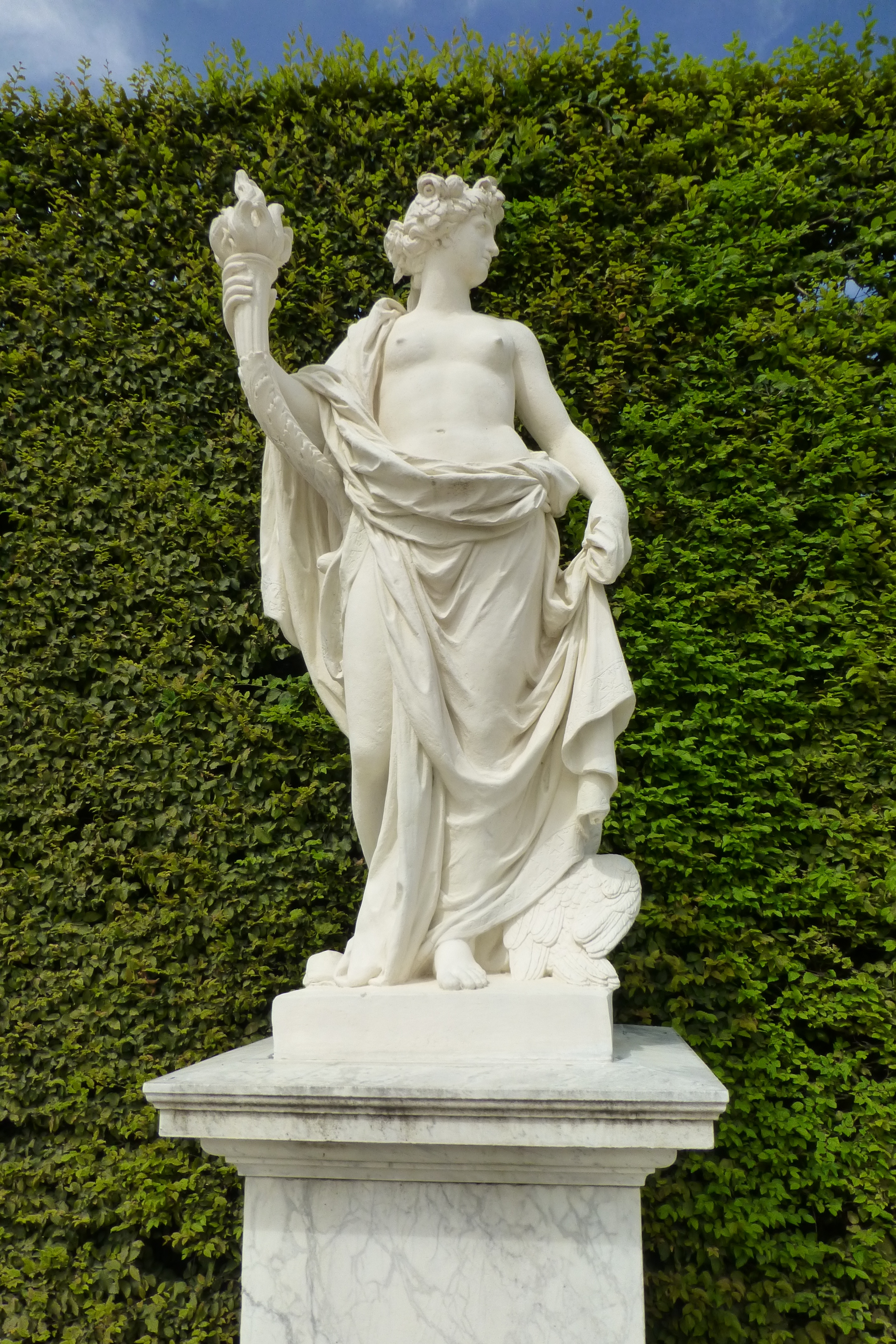
Night

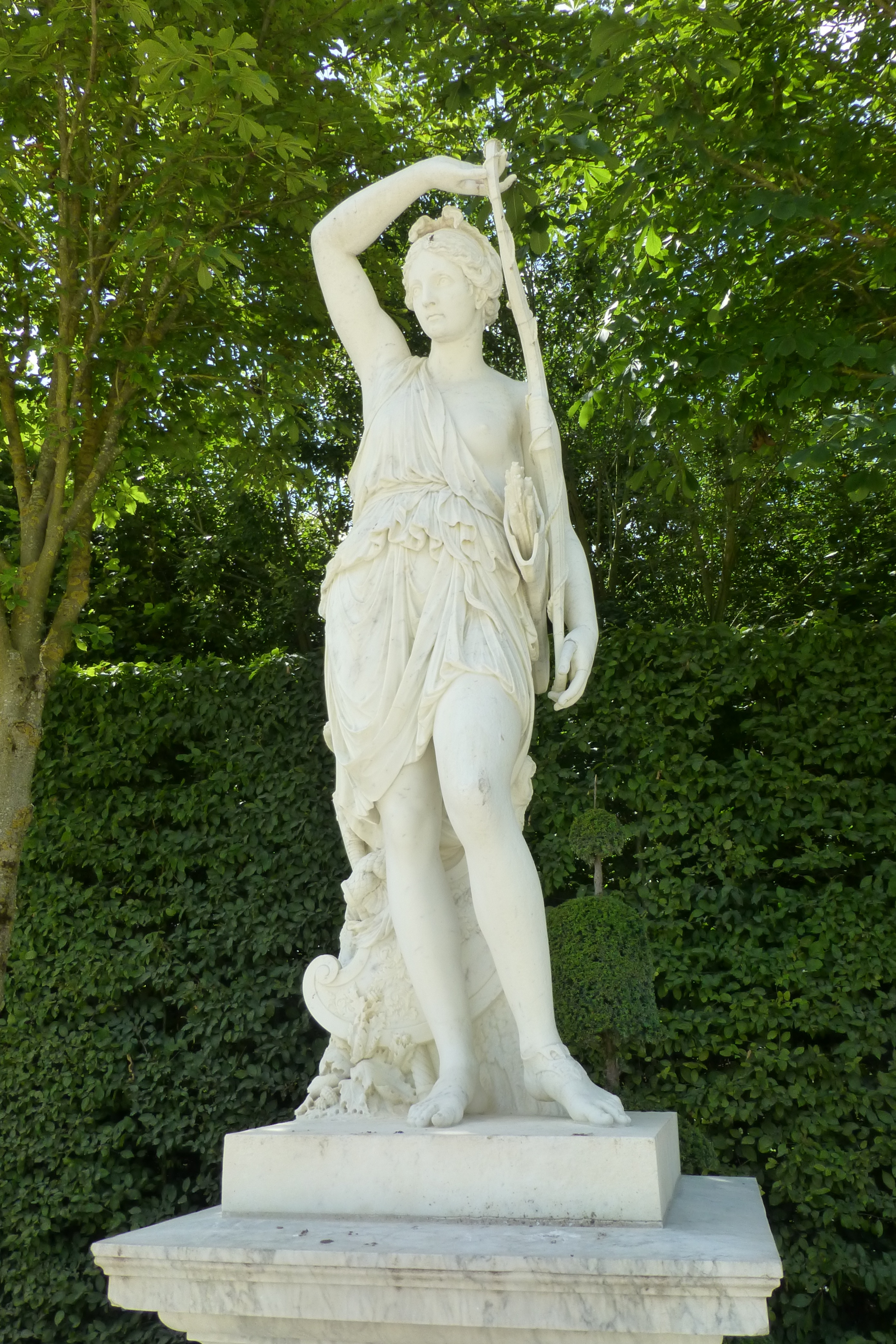
Diana

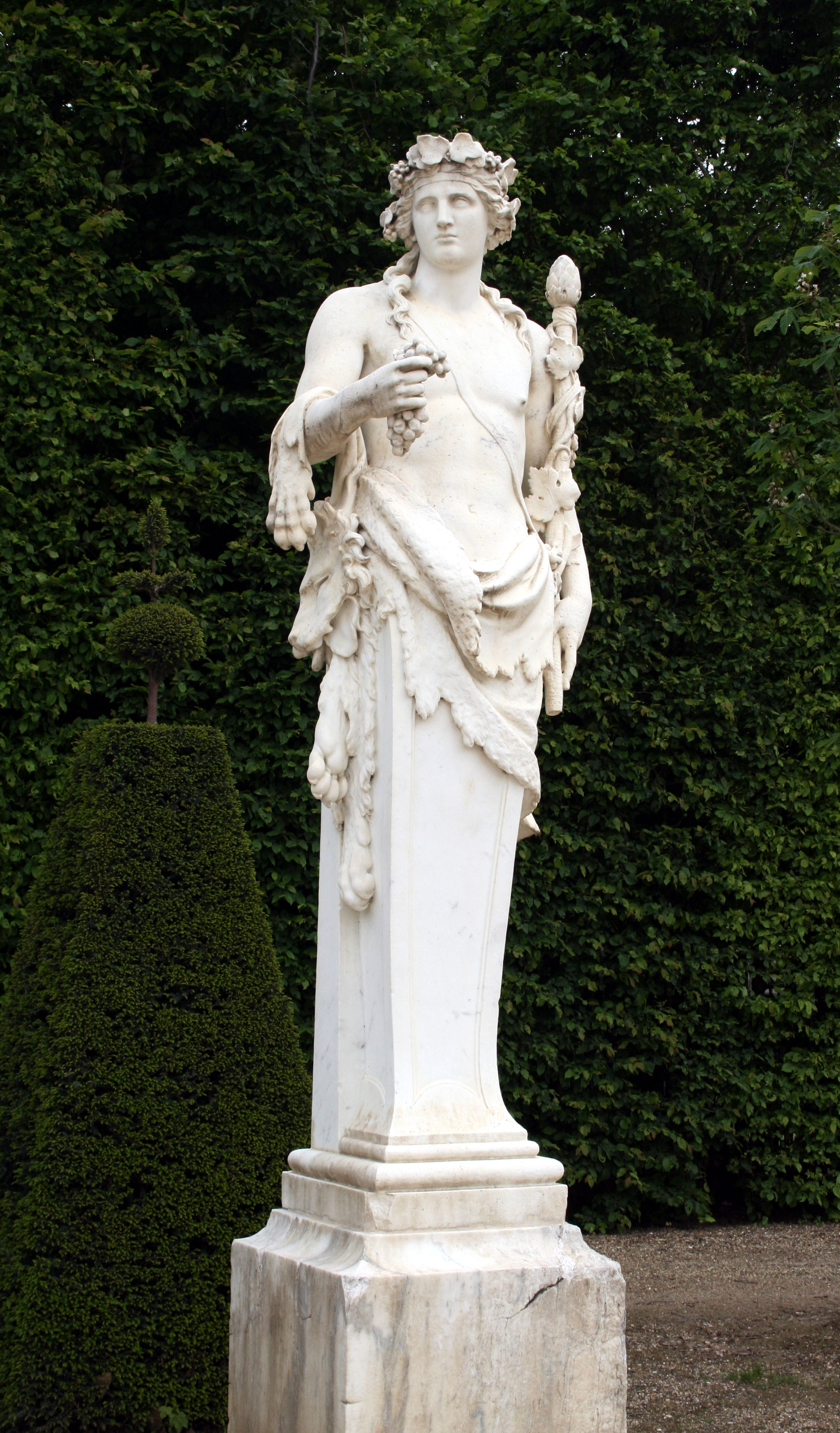
Bacchus
