= Alon Halevy =

Israeli-American computer scientist

Alon Y. Halevy
- אלון יצחק הלוי
- Born: Alon Yitzchack Levy
- Education: Stanford University
- Known for: Data integration
- Notable work: The Infinite Emotions of Coffee; Principles of Data Integration
- Awards: Fellow of the ACM, VLDB 10-year Best Paper Award (2006, 2018), Sloan Fellow, Presidential Early Career Award for Scientists and Engineers (2000), and SIGMOD Edgar F. Codd Innovations Award (2021)
- Scientific career
- Fields: Computer Science
- Workplaces: Google, Recruit Institute of Technology, Facebook AI, University of Washington
- Doctoral advisor: Richard Fikes, Edward Feigenbaum
- Notable students: Zachary G. Ives; Xin Luna Dong

Alon Yitzchack Halevy (until 2000: Levy; Hebrew: אלון יצחק הלוי) is an Israeli-American computer scientist and a researcher in the area of data integration. Since 2024, he is currently a Distinguished Engineer at Google Cloud. Previously, he was a Director at Meta AI, the founding CEO of Recruit Institute of Technology (later renamed Megagon Labs). He was a research scientist at Google from 2005 to 2015. Until 2006, he was a professor of computer science at the University of Washington, where his doctoral students included Xin Luna Dong and Zachary Ives. He received his PhD from Stanford University in 1993, under the joint supervision of Richard Fikes and Edward Feigenbaum.

In 2021, he received the SIGMOD Edgar F. Codd Innovations Award for his pioneering work on the foundations of data integration. He is a fellow of the ACM and a winner of the 2006 and 2018 VLDB 10-year best paper awards. He was a Sloan Fellow, and received the Presidential Early Career Award for Scientists and Engineers (PECASE) in 2000. He is the founder of two technology companies, Nimble Technology (now Actuate Corporation) and Transformic Inc (acquired by Google in 2005).

At Google he led the team that built Google Fusion Tables and WebTables. In recent years, he has worked on different aspects of building AI to enhance well-being.
