= Daniel S. Weld =

American computer scientist

Daniel Sabey Weld
- Born: September 13, 1960 (age 65); Boston
- Education: MIT; Yale University 1982
- Known for: automated planning and scheduling, software agents
- Scientific career
- Fields: Computer Science, Artificial Intelligence
- Workplaces: University of Washington
- Thesis: Theories of Comparative Analysis (1988)
- Doctoral advisor: Tomás Lozano-Pérez

Daniel Sabey Weld is an American computer scientist who is the Thomas J. Cable/WRF Professor of Computer Science and Engineering at the University of Washington, where he does research in automated planning and scheduling, software agents, and Internet information extraction. He is a venture partner at Madrona Venture Group, a Seattle-based venture capital firm.

Weld was born in 1960 in Boston. He attended high school at Phillips Academy, earned bachelor's degrees in Computer Science and Molecular Biophysics and Biochemistry (1982) from Yale University, and a master's degree (1984) and PhD (1988) in Computer Science from MIT. He is a Fellow of the Association for Computing Machinery and Association for the Advancement of Artificial Intelligence.

Weld co-founded Netbot Incorporated (1996), which was acquired by Excite; AdRelevance (1998), which was acquired by Media Metrix and then by Nielsen NetRatings; and Nimble Technology (1999), which was acquired by Actuate.
