= John Herbert Sleeman =

John Herbert Sleeman (4 February 1880, Bristol – 4 January 1963, Penzance) was a British classical scholar, co-author of Lexicon Plotinianum.

He was lecturer in Latin at Sheffield University (1909–15); then in Philosophy (1915–18); lecturer in classics at the Royal Holloway College for Women (1918–22); professor of classics at London University (1922–46).

== Writings ==
- (with Gilbert Pollet) Lexicon Plotinianum. 1980

=== School editions of classical authors ===
- Herodotus I. Clio. Edited with introduction and notes. Cambridge: CUP, 1909 (repr. 2002)
- Caesar in Britain and Belgium. Simplified text, with introductory, notes, exercises and vocabulary. 1912
- Cornelii Taciti De vita Iulii Agricolae, De origine et moribus Germanorum. Cambridge: CUP, 1914 (Pitt Press Series) digitized
