= Maxime de Redon des Chapelles =

Marquis Charles-François-Jean-Maxime de Redon des Chapelles was a theatrically-obsessed aristocrat under the French ancien régime, and a former French cavalry officer, who in Napoleon's France became one of the more prolific authors for the popular stage, writing melodramas and vaudevilles for the boulevard theatres.

== Career ==
Particularly in the earlier part of his dramatic career, he often worked in collaboration with others, many of them still obscure even now, including composers as well as writers: many of his dramas include songs and ensembles. Almost all survive in copies printed at the time. Maxime de Redon also wrote a small number of prose works, one of which touches on political themes. His dramatic career extended from 1805 until at least 1838, ending with a parody of Victor Hugo's Ruy Blas, but almost all details of de Redon's personal life are obscure. His initial successes as a dramatist came in the brief period of Napoleon's Consulate and then Empire, before the Emperor clamped down on plays, from 1807 severely restricting the number of licensed Parisian theatres.

After the fall of Napoleon in 1814 and the restoration of the Bourbon monarchy, de Redon appears to have become embroiled in the subsequent controversy surrounding the restitution of property and financial compensation to those émigrés who had suffered loss or expropriation under the Revolution - a controversy which in part contributed to the fall in 1830 of Louis XVIII. Redon's two pamphlets on the subject are a plea for such restitution; and in the lists of such payments issued by the Ministry of Finance the following year, his father Marquis Charles de Redon (briefly Colonel-in-Chief of the 25th Line Regiment of Infantry, previously the Régiment de Poitou) is listed as 'émigré' and Maxime de Redon as his 'fils et seul héritier.' Redon's sycophantic verses attached as a preface to one volume of the contemporary Annales de la littérature et des arts suggest that he was still, or had returned to being, a fervent supporter of the Bourbons.

== Dramatic works ==
with collaborators, and date and location of first performance, as given in subsequent publication

- Grimou, ou le Portrait à finir, with Pasquier (16 April 1805, Théâtre des Jeunes-Élèves)
- L'intrigue dans la rue, ou le Professeur de Montmartre, with Defrénoy (21 September 1805, Théâtre des Jeunes-Élèves)
- Réussirons-nous?, with Defrénoy (21 September 1805, Théâtre des Jeunes-Élèves)
- L'Amant instituteur, with Defrénoy (12 October 1805, Théâtre des Jeunes-Élèves)
- Avis aux pères, ou la Fille corrigée, with Defrénoy (16 May 1806, Théâtre des Jeunes-Artistes)
- Le Château mystérieux, ou le Crime commis et vengé (12 July 1806, Théâtre des Jeunes-Artistes)
- La Bavarde, with Defrénoy and Lesueur (2 August 1806, Théâtre des Jeunes-Artistes)
- Une espièglerie d'Arlequin, ou l'Enlèvement nocturne, with Defrénoy (21 August 1806, Théâtre des Jeunes-Artistes)
- Quatorze ans de souffrance, ou le Solitaire des Pyrénées, with Defrénoy (24 December 1806, Théâtre des Jeunes-Artistes)
- Les Illustres infortunés, ou la Souveraine vindictive, with Defrénoy (8 January 1807, Théâtre des Jeunes-Élèves)
- Le Pied de boeuf et la queue du chat, with Charrin (9 June 1807, Théâtre des Jeunes-Artistes)
- La Famille des guerriers (1 August 1807, Théâtre des Jeunes-Artistes)
- Confidence pour confidence, with Cantiran de Boirie (31 January 1811, Théâtre de l'Impératrice)
- Les écoliers (4 November 1823, Théâtre du Luxembourg)
- Le Souvenir et l'oubli, ou la Journée d'un bon maître (8 November 1825, Théâtre du Luxembourg)
- Les Princes d'Écosse, ou les Ruines de la forêt (27 December 1827, Théâtre du Luxembourg)
- La Boutique mystérieuse, ou les Deux voisins (22 October 1828, Théâtre du Luxembourg)
- La Muette (13 April 1828, Théâtre du Luxembourg)
- Le Jaloux, ou la Maison de santé (16 July 1828, Théâtre du Luxembourg)
- Le Faux ermite (29 August 1828, Théâtre du Luxembourg)
- La Journée aux évènements (13 March 1829, Théâtre du Luxembourg)
- L'Oreille du diable (28 September 1837, Théâtre Dorsay)
- Ruy-Brac (28 November 1838, theatre unknown)

== Theatres ==
Many of the lesser Parisian theatres underwent various changes of name during the Revolutionary and Napoleonic periods even if the physical building remained constant. Sometimes also theatre names disappeared, only to be re-used later. Thus one of the many popular theatres staging melodramas, vaudevilles, etc., the Theâtre du Luxembourg (see 1823 et seq.) which sometimes appears also as the Théâtre forain du Luxembourg, was situated in the 6th arrondissement of Paris, at no. 6 rue de Fleurus, just outside the Jardin du Luxembourg. It is not to be confused with the present-day marionette theatre within the Gardens themselves. Established in 1816 by the impresario-actor-clown-prompter-showman styling himself Bobino or Bobineau (real name: Saix), and thus sometimes also referred to as the Théâtre Bobino, the wooden building was demolished in 1868. In the years between 1823 and 1829, Maxime de Redon had several premières at this small theatre.

== Prose writings ==
- Entretiens sur les quatre premières règles de l'arithmétique (1812)
- Les hommes et les principes (1820)
- De l'émigration et des indemnités (n.d.)
- Réflexions sur l'émigration, l'indemnité et les circulaires ministérielles (1825)

== Verses and songs ==
- Voyage hors des barrières (1815)
- Chansons de M. le Marquis de Redon (1815)
