= Floridays =

Album by Jimmy Buffett

Studio album by Jimmy Buffett
- Released: June 1986
- Studio: New River (Fort Lauderdale); Ardent (Memphis); Village (Los Angeles)
- Genre: Country rock; Gulf and Western
- Length: 45:52
- Label: MCA; MCA-5730 (US, CD)
- Producer: Michael Utley

Jimmy Buffett chronology
Songs You Know by Heart (1985)	Floridays (1986)	Hot Water (1988)

Professional ratings
Review scores
Source	Rating
Allmusic	3.5/5 stars

Floridays is the fifteenth studio album by American popular music singer-songwriter Jimmy Buffett. It was released in June 1986 as MCA 5730 and was produced by Coral Reefer Band member Michael Utley and recorded and mixed by Jay Rifkin. The title of the album is taken from the 1941 poetry collection of the same name by Don Blanding. The album marks the end of Buffett's shift toward a more country sound that characterized his previous two releases and a return to a sound closer to that of his late 1970s and early 1980s output. The album features a wider variety of musical instruments than was typical for Buffett's previous works, notably several songs with strings and horns. His daughter Savannah Jane Buffett is credited for playing mini-conga on the album. It was also his last studio album to feature Jimmy Buffett's trademark mustache, before he shaved it off for the next album Hot Water in 1988.

== Songs ==
All of the album's songs were written or co-written by Buffett (with the title track and "First Look" being his first solo credits since One Particular Harbour) except for "If It All Falls Down" written by Coral Reefer Band member Matt Betton. "I Love The Now" was co-written with actress and author Carrie Fisher.

The songs "First Look" and "When the Coast is Clear" later appeared on the box set Boats, Beaches, Bars & Ballads, and "Creola" appeared on Meet Me in Margaritaville: The Ultimate Collection. Buffett rearranged the song "Floridays" for the 2006 film Hoot, in which he co-starred.

== Chart performance ==
Floridays reached No. 67 on the Billboard 200 album chart and No. 32 on the Billboard Top Country Albums chart. None of the album's three singles charted.

Chart (1986)	Peak position
U.S. Billboard Top Country Albums	32
U.S. Billboard 200	67
Canadian RPM Top Albums	91

== Track listing ==
Side One
No.	Title	Writer(s)	Length
1.	"I Love the Now"	Jimmy Buffett, Carrie Fisher	5:01
2.	"Creola"	Jimmy Buffett, Ralph MacDonald, William Salter	5:39 (LP), 7:03 (CD)
3.	"First Look"	Jimmy Buffett	3:59
4.	"Meet Me in Memphis"	Jimmy Buffett, Michael Utley	4:46
5.	"Nobody Speaks to the Captain No More"	Jimmy Buffett	5:07

Side Two
No.	Title	Writer(s)	Length
6.	"Floridays"	Jimmy Buffett	4:52
7.	"If It All Falls Down"	Matt Betton	4:45
8.	"No Plane on Sunday"	Jimmy Buffett, Michael Utley	4:16
9.	"When the Coast Is Clear"	Jimmy Buffett, Mac McAnally	2:56
10.	"You'll Never Work in Dis Bidness Again"	Jimmy Buffett, Michael Utley, Vince Melamed, Josh Leo, Willie Weeks, Matt Betton	3:10

== Personnel ==
The Coral Reefer Band:

- Jimmy Buffett – Acoustic guitar
- Reggie Young – Electric guitar
- Josh Leo – Electric and acoustic guitar
- Willie Weeks – Bass
- Michael Utley – Keyboards
- Vince Melamed – Keyboards
- Matt Betton – Drums
- Sam Clayton – Congas
- Robert Greenidge – Steel drums, timbales
- Ralph MacDonald – Bongos, congas, tambourine and other percussion
- Greg "Fingers" Taylor – Harmonica
- Savannah Jane Buffett – Mini-conga
- Josh Leo, Vince Melamed, Harry Stinson, Sam Clayton, Jimmy Buffett, Rita Coolidge, David Lasley, Cameron Grillo, Gene Van Buren, Phyllis Duncan, Deborah Hall, Helen Duncan Benard – background vocals

== Singles ==
- “I Love the Now” b/w “No Plane on Sunday” (Released on MCA 52849 in 1986)
- "Creola" b/w "You'll Never Work In Dis Bidness Again" (Released on MCA 52932 in September 1986)
- "Take It Back" b/w "Floridays" (Released on MCA 53035 in January 1987)

== Tour ==
1986 brought yet another summer tour, this time to promote the Floridays album, with all the usual stops.

=== 1986 Coral Reefer Band ===
- Jimmy Buffett: Vocals and guitar
- Josh Leo: Guitar (Summer Tour Dates)
- Tim Krekel: Guitar (Fall Tour Dates)
- George Porter: Bass (Summer Tour Dates)
- Tim Drummond: Bass (Fall Tour Dates)
- Matt Betton: Drums
- Greg “Fingers” Taylor: Harmonica and background vocals
- Michael Utley: Piano and organ (Summer Tour Dates)
- Vince Melamed: Keyboards and organ (Fall Tour Dates)
- Sam Clayton: Congas
- Robert Greenidge: Steel Drums
- Larry Lee: Percussion

=== Set list ===
The only set list from the tour that's been confirmed is that of the Convention Center Arena in Dallas. While the structure of Buffett's set lists generally remain the same in a given tour, the song selection varies from night to night; so it's more than likely that there were many changes to the set list as the tour progressed.

Convention Center Arena
Tuesday, August 12, 1986

1. "Coconut Telegraph"
2. "Ragtop Day"
3. "Grapefruit—Juicy Fruit"
4. "Boat Drinks"
5. "Meet Me in Memphis"
6. "Volcano"
7. "Havana Daydreamin'"
8. "If the Phone Doesn't Ring, It's Me"
9. "Why Don't We Get Drunk"
10. "Cheeseburger in Paradise"
11. "Creola"
12. "Fins"
13. "Changes in Latitudes, Changes in Attitudes"
  Intermission
14. "African Friend"
15. "If It All Falls Down"
16. "Pencil Thin Mustache" (solo acoustic)
17. "Son of a Son of a Sailor" (solo acoustic)
18. "Nobody Speaks to the Captain No More"
19. "Gypsies in the Palace"
20. "Come Monday"
21. "One Particular Harbour"
22. "A Pirate Looks at Forty"
  Encore:
23. "Margaritaville"
24. "I Love the Now"
  Encore 2:
25. "He Went to Paris" (solo acoustic)
