= Live by the Bay =

- Cover of the VHS release
- Directed by: Jack Cole
- Produced by: Tammara Wells
- Starring: Jimmy Buffett
- Music by: Jimmy Buffett
- Distributed by: MCA
- Release date: March 1, 1986
- Running time: 87 minutes
- Language: English

Live by the Bay is a 1986 direct-to-video concert film of American popular music singer-songwriter Jimmy Buffett and the Coral Reefer Band. It was released in 1986 by MCA Entertainment. The 87-minute film was recorded from back to back concerts in Miami, Florida on August 16 and 17, 1985, at Miami Marine Stadium and is the first concert video released by Buffett. Miami Vice star Don Johnson introduced Buffett to the crowd. A brief rain shower during the middle of the Friday night show prompted Buffett to retreat to his sailboat (docked by the stage) and caused a majority of the final video release to feature the Saturday night show. After the rain cleared on Friday, the band played Little Feat's "Dixie Chicken" to demonstrate the equipment still functioned before Buffett returned to the stage.

Live by the Bay opening titles with a shot of Miami Marine Stadium as the concert is beginning

The stadium was originally built for powerboat racing. It used a floating stage in front of the grandstand that allowed additional concertgoers to listen from their boats in the water behind the stage, as seen in video. The video introduction includes extended footage of "parrothead" fans on boats and in the water with "Gypsies in the Palace" playing in the background. Buffett returned to Miami Marine Stadium in 1987 for a concert with the Desperadoes Steel Orchestra, but the stadium was ultimately condemned after Hurricane Andrew in 1992 and remains an abandoned hulk to this day. In 2009, Buffett recorded a short video supporting efforts to restore the stadium.

Released on March 1, 1986, the video of Live by the Bay was directed by Jack Cole, produced by Tammara Wells, while the audio was recorded and mixed by Elliot Scheiner. The film was released on VHS, Betamax and LaserDisc. As of 2022, the video is out of print and has not been released on DVD. It was occasionally shown on television by the now-defunct VH1 Classic cable network as part of its Classic in Concert series.

At the time, reviewers called the concert video "an amiable mix of folk, rock, country and calypso that conjures up images of good times and tropical breezes" played before "thousands of fans, most of whom seem to have had one too many".

== Track list ==
Following are the tracks on the video:

1. Introduction / "Gypsies in the Palace"
2. "Door Number Three"
3. "Grapefruit-Juicy Fruit"
4. "We Are the People Our Parents Warned Us About"
5. "Stars on the Water"
6. "Coconut Telegraph"
7. "Come Monday"
8. "Ragtop Day"
9. "Who's the Blonde Stranger"
10. "Volcano"
11. "Changes in Latitudes, Changes in Attitudes"
12. Intermission / Interview
13. "One Particular Harbour"
14. "If The Phone Doesn't Ring, It's Me"
15. "Why Don't We Get Drunk and Screw"
16. "Cheeseburger in Paradise"
17. "Fins"
18. "Last Mango in Paris"
19. "A Pirate Looks at Forty"
20. "Margaritaville"
21. End titles / "Son of a Son of a Sailor"

== Actual set list ==
There were several songs deleted from the film.

1. The Great Filling Station Holdup*
2. Son of a Son of a Sailor**
3. Door Number Three
4. Grapefruit—Juicy Fruit
5. Pencil Thin Mustache*
6. We Are the People our Parents Warned us About
  Main Set
7. Stars on the Water
8. Coconut Telegraph
9. Come Monday
10. Ragtop Day
11. Who's the Blonde Stranger?
12. Volcano
13. Changes in Latitudes, Changes in Attitudes
  Intermission
14. One Particular Harbour
15. If the Phone Doesn't Ring, It's Me
16. Why Don't We Get Drunk
17. Let it Ride (Josh Leo)*
18. Dixie Chicken (Josh Leo)*
19. I Can't Tell You Why (Timothy B. Schmit)*
20. Medley:*
  1. Nautical Wheelers*
  2. Tin Cup Chalice*
  3. Boat Drinks*
  4. Banana Republics*
  5. The Captain and the Kid*
  6. Somewhere Over China*
  7. He Went to Paris*
  8. Cowboy in the Jungle*
21. Cheeseburger in Paradise
22. Fins
23. Last Mango in Paris
24. A Pirate looks at Forty
25. Margaritaville
  Encore
26. Gypsies in the Palace**
27. Brown Eyed Girl*

* = Not included on Live By the Bay
** = Abridged version appeared on Live By the Bay, not included on the track list and out of order
