= Escape to Margaritaville =

2018 musical featuring the music of Jimmy Buffett

- Music: Jimmy Buffett
- Lyrics: Jimmy Buffett
- Book: Greg Garcia and Mike O'Malley
- Setting: Present Day, The Caribbean & Ohio
- Premiere: May 17, 2017: San Diego
- Productions: 2017 La Jolla Playhouse; 2018 Broadway; 2019 National Tour

Escape to Margaritaville is a 2017 American jukebox musical by Greg Garcia and Mike O'Malley, based on the songs of Jimmy Buffett. The plot revolves around a part-time bartender and singer who falls for a career-minded tourist. The show's music consists of songs previously recorded by Buffett, and written by him and various other songwriters, with one exception, the original song "Three Chords".

Following try-out performances in La Jolla, New Orleans, Houston, and Chicago, the show premiered on Broadway in February 2018 at the Marriott Marquis Theatre. A national tour launched in 2019.

== Productions ==
The La Jolla Playhouse presented the musical in a limited engagement from May 9 until July 9, 2017. Following its run in La Jolla, the musical had limited runs in New Orleans, Louisiana from October 20 until October 28, Houston, Texas from October 31 until November 5 and in Chicago, Illinois from November 9 until December 2, 2017.

The musical premiered on Broadway at the Marquis Theatre on February 16, 2018, prior to a March 15, 2018 opening, directed by Christopher Ashley and choreographed by Kelly Devine. The musical closed on July 1 of the same year, after 29 previews and 124 regular performances. The musical performed on the PBS A Capitol Fourth TV special on July 4, 2018, in Washington, D.C.

Upon closing, Broadway Licensing acquired the rights for stock and amateur performance rights.

A non-Equity national tour launched in Providence, Rhode Island, in September 2019. The tour was suspended during the COVID-19 pandemic and resumed in September 2021.

== Synopsis ==
=== Act I ===
Tully Mars works as a singer for the bar at Margaritaville, a run down hotel on a small island in the Caribbean, along with Brick, the bartender, Jamal, the busboy, Marley, the owner, and J.D., a one eyed beach bum who spends his days at the bar. He regularly has affairs with female guests with no intention of continuing the fling beyond their time at the hotel ("License to Chill").

In Cincinnati, Ohio, Rachel and Tammy prepare to go on vacation at the Margaritaville before Tammy gets married. Her fiancé, Chadd, forces Tammy to go on a diet of carrot juice and sunflower seeds, so she can lose weight for the wedding, which infuriates Rachel. Chadd has Tammy promise not to cheat on him and his friends warn the two women of the land sharks. Tammy and Rachel laugh their warning off and travel to the hotel ("Fins").

Rachel is disappointed with the condition of the hotel, even though Tammy is just happy to be on vacation. Tully flirts with Rachel, who is more concerned about work, and has Brick bring tequila shots, to which Rachel questions if it's the appropriate time to start drinking. Tully, Brick, J.D., and the patrons insist that ("It's Five O'Clock Somewhere"). Tully and Brick take the women's bags to their room, along with some margaritas. Rachel insists going up to the volcano so she can obtain a soil sample. Brick offers to drive them up in his run down convertible ("Ragtop Day").

On the way to the volcano, the car breaks down, and the four search for another form of transportation. Brick and Tammy hit it off, while Tully continues to flirt with Rachel, where she informs him of her experiment to use potatoes as an alternative energy resource and how it takes up much of her time, leaving her no time to relax ("It's My Job"). Brick and Tammy rent bikes and the four continue their journey.

On the beach, J.D. tells guests stories about his life and his buried treasure, which Marley dismisses as lies. After being ordered to leave the guests alone, J.D. begins to sing a song that she disapproves of and invites the guests sing along ("Why Don't We Get Drunk").

At the volcano, Tully tries to get Rachel to relax and enjoy her time on the island. He breaks the ice between them by teaching her how to play guitar ("Three Chords"). Tammy and Brick discuss their childhoods and how their parents had very high expectations for them, finding amusement that they had become the people their parents frowned upon ("We Are The People Our Parents Warned Us About"). During the song Brick hallucinates zombie insurance salesmen. Brick and Tammy almost kiss before Tammy reveals that she is engaged. Later that night, Tully reveals to Rachel that he grew up in Maine, where his father wanted him to continue the family line of fisherman. He arrived at the island to get away from the cold weather, pollution, and irritations of society. Rachel, finding herself charmed, kisses him ("Son of a Son of a Sailor").

Back at the hotel, everyone is recovering from the previous night of drinking and partying ("My Head Hurts, My Feet Stink, and I Don't Love Jesus"). Tully and Rachel prepare to go snorkeling and Marley notices something different about Tully. He then admits to her that he thinks he's in love with Rachel. After swearing that she wouldn't tell anyone, she tells some guests, and word spreads around the hotel. Tully and Rachel spend the rest of the week in bed and on the beach, causing Tully to miss work. Brick tries to help keep Tammy from giving into her urge to sleep with him. On her last night on the island, he suggests they do something to distract her and the two decide to get tattoos, with Brick needing to be drunk due to his fear of needles. On their last night on the island, Rachel and Tammy discuss how the past week has changed their views of the future ("Medley: Coconut Telegraph/Last Mango in Paris/Changes in Latitudes, Changes in Attitudes").

Tully decides to tell Rachel how he feels, but she and Tammy leave before he can. Brick discovers that his tattoo on his stomach is of Tammy's face and admits to Tully that he has feelings for Tammy. The two lament about their failed romances, while J.D. looks for a salt shaker for his shrimp ("Margaritaville"). The guests feel tremors and realize the volcano is about to erupt. Everyone begins to panic, sending Margaritaville into chaos.

=== Act II ===
Jamal wonders where he will go after evacuating the island as the patrons panic, Marley tries to keep everyone calm, Tully and Brick pack the boat with whatever they can, and J.D. grabs a shovel ("Volcano"). After everyone is onboard of the evacuation boat, Marley notices J.D. is missing, and Jamal reveals that he saw him heading into the jungle. Tully and Brick go to find J.D., despite Brick's objections.

In the jungle, Tully tells Brick to think of things that make him happy in order to control his fear ("Grapefruit–Juicy Fruit"). During which Brick learns how to manage his hallucinations of zombies with a tap dance number. After which Tully and Brick find J.D., who is digging up his buried treasure. The two insist that the treasure isn't real, as they believe he just makes up his stories. The two are shocked when J.D. digs up a chest as Marley arrives, revealing she had to let the boat leave due to the guests panicking. J.D. has Marley take them to his plane, which she hid due to his pilot license being revoked. At the airport, Tammy and Rachel prepare to take off and Rachel learns that funding for her experiment has been denied, much to her dismay.

Up in the air, J.D. flies Marley, Tully, and Brick to safety. Tully and Brick go through J.D.'s treasure and find pictures and journals, learning that J.D. moved to Europe, married an actress, and had a son. His wife and son were killed when a bomb went off, while J.D. survived. J.D. tells the two that even though he's been through tragedy, he's had a good life ("He Went to Paris"). Tully reveals to J.D. that he hoped the treasure would be money that he could give to Rachel to help fund her experiment. J.D. tells Tully that the real treasure is what is in the heart and the memories of all the good times. He insists that Tully tell Rachel that he loves her, to which Tully has J.D. fly them to Cincinnati.

At a bar in Cincinnati, Tammy and Chadd's rehearsal dinner is underway. She prepares to go eat a cheeseburger, but Chadd has set up a vegetarian buffet for her, due to her diet. She fantasizes about eating a cheeseburger, when Brick enters and urges her to quit her diet ("Cheeseburger in Paradise"). Chadd sees them eating the burgers and tells Tammy that he can't love her if she's fat, causing Tammy to punch him and call the wedding off. J.D. and Marley discuss about the time they slept together ten years ago, and admit that they have feelings for each other. Tully enters and tells Rachel that he loves her, to which Rachel isn't sure how to respond. Tully plays a song to remind her of their time together on the island ("Tin Cup Chalice"). She admits that she has feelings for Tully, but they are too different and that a relationship probably won't last. She leaves and Tully is approached by Ted, a talent agent, who insists that Tully can become famous with his music.

Over the course of three years, Brick and Tammy get married and have a daughter; after being denied by numerous banks, Rachel finally gets funding for her research; J.D. and Marley become a couple, rebuild Margaritaville, and have a daughter; and Tully becomes an international music star ("Love and Luck"). Tully returns to Margaritaville to perform for the hotel's re-opening and notices Rachel in the crowd. The two catch up and realize they are still in love with each other ("Come Monday"). A year later, Brick and Tammy receive an invitation to Tully and Rachel's wedding and first class tickets. Tully, Rachel, Tammy, Brick, J.D. and Marley reflect on how much their lives have changed in the past few years as the wedding is being prepared and the guests arrive ("A Pirate Looks at Forty"). The two are married and everyone celebrates at Margaritaville ("One Particular Harbor").

== Musical numbers ==
Act I

- "License to Chill" – Tully, Company
- "Fins" – Rachel, Tammy, Chadd, Goons, Ensemble
- "It's Five O'Clock Somewhere" – Tully, Brick, J.D., Tammy, Company
- "Ragtop Day" – Brick, Tammy, Tully, Rachel
- "It's My Job" – Rachel
- "Why Don't We Get Drunk" – J.D., Ensemble
- "Three Chords" – Tully, Rachel
- "We Are the People Our Parents Warned Us About/The Natives Are Restless" – Brick, Tammy
- "Son of a Son of a Sailor" – Tully, Rachel
- "My Head Hurts, My Feet Stink and I Don't Love Jesus" – Marley, Jamal, JD, Ensemble
- "Medley: Coconut Telegraph/Last Mango in Paris/Changes in Latitudes, Changes in Attitudes" – Company
- "Margaritaville" – Tully, Brick, Company

Act II

- "Volcano" – Jamal, Ensemble
- "Grapefruit—Juicy Fruit" – Brick, Tully, J.D.
- "He Went to Paris" – Tully, Brick, J.D.
- "Cheeseburger in Paradise" – Brick, Tammy, Ensemble
- "Tin Cup Chalice" – Tully, Ensemble
- "Love and Luck" – Tully, Rachel, Ensemble
- "Come Monday" – Tully, Rachel
- "A Pirate Looks at Forty" – Company
- "One Particular Harbor" – Company

== Characters and original cast ==
Character	La Jolla Playhouse (2017)	Broadway (2018)	1st National Tour
Tully Mars	Paul Alexander Nolan	Paul Alexander Nolan	Chris Clark
Rachel	Alison Luff	Alison Luff	Sarah Hinrichsen
Tammy	Lisa Howard	Lisa Howard	Shelly Lynn Walsh / Emily Qualmann
Brick	Charlie Pollock	Eric Petersen	Peter Michael Jordan
Marley	Rema Webb	Rema Webb	Rachel Lyn Fobbs
J.D.	Don Sparks	Don Sparks	Patrick Cogan
Jamal/Ted	Andre Ward	Andre Ward	Matthew James
Jesus	Mike Millan	Mike Millan	Diego Alejando González
Chadd	Alex Michael Stoll	Ian Michael Stuart	Noah Bridgestock / Kyle Southern

== Critical reception ==
The show's 2018 Broadway debut received generally negative reviews. Jesse Green, writing for The New York Times began by saying, "If ever there were a time to be drunk in the theater, this is it," and The Washington Post called it "insufferably dumb." NJ.com praised the main actors as they "do their best" with the story, but also called the musical "an unfortunate mishmash of Buffett staples" and "a handful of tepid new compositions." It said the first act was a "garishly-colored explosion of randomness and kitsch that you (almost) start to root for," before devolving into a second act that is "merely terrible." It also noted that a romance plot with two chorus members "inexplicably upstaged" the leads, proving distracting.

Bloomberg gave it a very negative review, calling it a "bland ode to wastin' away." It said it "blends the greatest hits of Jimmy Buffett, a set of cheery cardboard characters, and a simple—if occasionally demented—plot into a concoction syrupy enough to taste sort of like a Broadway show. But like the worst versions of its namesake beverage, it's too watered-down to be much fun." The cast was described as talented, and "carries the show as best it can." Vulture also gave it a negative review, calling it an "empty shell" instead of fun.

However, it also received a handful of positive reviews, with praise for the cast. Entertainment Weekly said it would give audiences "a light buzz." Newsday said it was a "delightful, energetic frothy drink of a show" which would have been appropriate for a beach-side theater. Calling the writing clever for its incorporation of Buffett songs, it said it was enjoyable for audience members who "don’t expect too much." The Hollywood Reporter was of the opinion that Buffett fans would enjoy the musical, noting that at the showing, many fans "enthusiastically" shouted lyrics. Attributing a "distinct sitcom-style sensibility" to the "rudimentary" book (dialogue and script) by Greg Garcia and Mike O'Malley, the review said the show "exudes an affable likability that's hard to entirely resist." It praised "clever staging" by Christopher Ashley and "exuberant" choreography. The leads were also praised for "charm and charisma."
