= Meet Me in Margaritaville: The Ultimate Collection =

Greatest hits album by Jimmy Buffett
- Released: April 15, 2003
- Genres: Country rock; Gulf and Western
- Length: 2:29:46
- Label: UTV/MCA/Mailboat

Jimmy Buffett chronology
Far Side of the World (2002)	Meet Me in Margaritaville: The Ultimate Collection (2003)	Live in Auburn, WA (2003)

Professional ratings
Review scores
Source	Rating
Allmusic	4/5 stars

Meet Me in Margaritaville: The Ultimate Collection is a Jimmy Buffett greatest hits compilation album consisting of 2 compact discs and 38 songs. The album is notable for several newly recorded and updated versions of songs considered as classics in his repertoire. It includes every track from Songs You Know By Heart except for "Boat Drinks".

This collection presents 12 new recordings. As this is a career retrospective and aimed at a more casual audience, the album met criticism due to a quarter of the material being new recordings rather than focus on the original incarnations of the songs.

The following six songs are re-recordings of previously released songs: "The Captain and the Kid", "He Went to Paris", "In the Shelter", "Knees of My Heart", "Saxophones", and "Son of a Son of a Sailor". The new version of "Son of a Son of a Sailor" is a duet with Nadirah Shakoor. The following four songs are new live recordings: "Desperation Samba (Halloween in Tijuana)", "Holiday", "The Pascagoula Run" and "A Pirate Looks at Forty". Buffett also newly recorded two covers: ""Everybody's Talkin'" by Fred Neil (but made famous in a recording by Harry Nilsson) and The Beach Boys' "Sail On Sailor". Despite being included as the original studio version, "Volcano"'s fourth verse has been rewritten and overdubbed.

== Track listing ==
All tracks are written by Jimmy Buffett unless otherwise noted.

Disc one
No.	Title	Writer(s)	Length
1.	"Margaritaville"		4:10
2.	"Migration"		4:14
3.	"Growing Older but Not Up"		3:26
4.	"Holiday" (Recorded live on 2/10/2001 in Sunrise, FL)	Jimmy Buffett; Ralph MacDonald; William Salter; Bill Eaton	5:24
5.	"Come Monday"		3:09
6.	"We Are the People Our Parents Warned Us About"		3:21
7.	"Fruitcakes"	Jimmy Buffett; Amy Lee	7:39
8.	"Cheeseburger in Paradise"		2:50
9.	"Jolly Mon Sing"	Jimmy Buffett; Will Jennings; Michael Utley	3:15
10.	"The Pascagoula Run" (Recorded live on 2/5/2003 in Columbia, SC)	Buffett, Oliver	4:00
11.	"Tin Cup Chalice"		3:37
12.	"Pencil Thin Moustache"		2:51
13.	"Grapefruit/Juicy Fruit"		2:57
14.	"Coconut Telegraph"		2:59
15.	"Changes in Latitudes, Changes in Attitudes"		3:17
16.	"Last Mango in Paris"	Jimmy Buffett; Marshall Chapman; Will Jennings; Michael Utley	3:16
17.	"Fins"	Jimmy Buffett; Barry Chance; Deborah McColl; Tom Corcoran	3:26
18.	"Why Don't We Get Drunk"	Gardens	2:43
19.	"Brown Eyed Girl"	Van Morrison	3:54
20.	"One Particular Harbour"	Jimmy Buffett; Bobby Holcomb	5:30
Total length:			1:15:58

Disc two
No.	Title	Writer(s)	Length
1.	"School Boy Heart"	Jimmy Buffett; Matt Betton	4:33
2.	"Everybody's Talkin'"	Neil	3:00
3.	"Volcano" (Partially Re-Recorded with New Overdubbed Fourth Verse)	Jimmy Buffett; Keith Sykes; Harry Dailey	3:38
4.	"Son of a Son of a Sailor" (duet with Nadirah Shakoor; Exclusive Re-Recording)		4:46
5.	"Take Another Road"	Jimmy Buffett; Roger Guth; Jay Oliver	3:41
6.	"Knees of My Heart" (Exclusive Re-Recording)	Jimmy Buffett; Will Jennings; Michael Utley	3:03
7.	"In the Shelter" (Exclusive Re-Recording)		4:01
8.	"Havana Daydreamin'"		3:39
9.	"Desperation Samba (Halloween in Tijuana)" (Recorded live on 9/29/2001 in Tinley Park, IL)	Jimmy Buffett; Will Jennings; Timothy B. Schmit	4:17
10.	"Barefoot Children"	Jimmy Buffett; Roger Guth; Russ Kunkel; Peter Mayer; Jay Oliver	4:53
11.	"Saxophones" (Exclusive Re-Recording)		3:48
12.	"Cowboy in the Jungle"		5:08
13.	"He Went to Paris" (Exclusive Re-Recording)		3:56
14.	"Creola"	Jimmy Buffett; William Salter; Ralph MacDonald	7:01
15.	"Bob Robert's Society Band"	Jimmy Buffett; Amy Lee	3:43
16.	"A Pirate Looks at Forty" (Recorded live on 8/20/2002 in Burgettstown, PA)		4:33
17.	"Sail On, Sailor"	Ray Kennedy; Van Dyke Parks; Brian Wilson; Tandyn Almer; Jack Rieley	2:44
18.	"The Captain and the Kid" (Exclusive Re-Recording)		3:24
Total length:			1:13:46
