= The Great Filling Station Holdup =

Single by Jimmy Buffett

from the album A White Sport Coat and a Pink Crustacean
- A-side: "The Great Filling Station Holdup"
- B-side: "Why Don't We Get Drunk"
- Released: 1973
- Recorded: 1973
- Studio: Glaser Sound (Nashville, Tennessee)
- Genre: Country
- Length: 3:02
- Label: Dunhill; D-4385 (US, 7")
- Songwriter(s): Jimmy Buffett
- Producer(s): Don Gant

Jimmy Buffett singles chronology
"Captain America" (1970)	"The Great Filling Station Holdup" (1973)	"They Don't Dance Like Carmen No More" (1973)

"The Great Filling Station Hold Up" is a song written and performed by American popular music singer-songwriter Jimmy Buffett. It was first released on his 1973 album A White Sport Coat and a Pink Crustacean and was his first single from that album. The single reached No. 58 on the US Country chart in 1973.

The song appears on Live at Fenway Park, a live album that opened with an acoustic set consisting of "Changes in Latitudes, Changes in Attitudes", "The Great Filling Station Holdup" and "Pencil Thin Mustache".

== History ==
The song is about two robbers holding up a filling station and the aftermath of getting caught shortly after the robbery in a honky tonk, where both robbers are drunk on beer they bought with the cash they stole. Buffett got the idea to write the song after finding amusement in a newspaper article about recovered property from a holdup.

Soon after the release of the single, with "Why Don't We Get Drunk" as its B-side, it was reported that it had sold over 50,000 copies just to jukebox operators, according to B.J. McElvee, country promotion manager for ABC-Dunhill Records. Billboard magazine reported that only the A-side was promoted to country radio, because the word "screw" (repeatedly used in "Why Don't We Get Drunk") was not generally acceptable in country radio programming at the time; however, "Why Don't We Get Drunk" was played by some "underground" stations on FM radio. "Why Don't We Get Drunk" was identified by Billboard as a "jukebox favorite" more than three years after its original release.

== Chart performance ==
Chart (1973)	Peak position
U.S. Hot Country Songs	58
