= Songs You Know by Heart =

Greatest hits album by Jimmy Buffett
- Released: October 28, 1985
- Genre: Country rock; Gulf and Western
- Length: 42:44
- Label: MCA
- Producer: Don Gant, Norbert Putnam

Jimmy Buffett chronology
Last Mango in Paris (1985)	Songs You Know by Heart (1985)	Floridays (1986)

Alternative cover
- CD release cover art

Professional ratings
Review scores
Source	Rating
Allmusic	4.5/5 stars

Songs You Know by Heart: Jimmy Buffett's Greatest Hit(s) is the 18th album and the first greatest hits compilation by American singer-songwriter Jimmy Buffett. It was released in 1985. The parenthetical "s" in the subtitle alludes to the status at the time of "Margaritaville" as Buffett's single large chart hit.

Despite its 1985 release date, the album only includes songs from 1973 to 1979. Aside from 1976's Havaña Daydreamin', this compilation includes at least one song from each of Buffett's ABC Records/MCA Records albums released between 1973 and 1979.

== Commercial performance ==
The album reached No. 100 on the Billboard 200. The album however has continued to sell, and it was certified Gold by the RIAA on December 12, 1989, and 7× Platinum on November 21, 2005, which made it Buffett's most commercially successful. It has sold 5,646,300 copies in the United States as of October 2019. Following Buffett's death in September 2023, Songs You Know By Heart re-entered the Billboard 200 at a new peak position of No. 4.

== Track listing ==
Side 1
No.	Title	Writer(s)	Original album	Length
1.	"Cheeseburger in Paradise"	Jimmy Buffett	Son of a Son of a Sailor	2:53
2.	"He Went to Paris"	Buffett	A White Sport Coat and a Pink Crustacean	3:31
3.	"Fins"	Buffett, Deborah McColl, Barry Chance, Tom Corcoran	Volcano	3:27
4.	"Son of a Son of a Sailor"	Buffett	Son of a Son of a Sailor	3:25
5.	"A Pirate Looks at Forty"	Buffett	A1A	3:55
6.	"Margaritaville"	Buffett	Changes in Latitudes, Changes in Attitudes	4:11

Side 2
No.	Title	Writer(s)	Original album	Length
7.	"Come Monday"	Buffett	Living and Dying in 3/4 Time	3:11
8.	"Changes in Latitudes, Changes in Attitudes"	Buffett	Changes in Latitudes, Changes in Attitudes	3:18
9.	"Why Don't We Get Drunk"	Marvin Gardens	A White Sport Coat and a Pink Crustacean	2:44
10.	"Pencil Thin Mustache"	Buffett	Living and Dying in 3/4 Time	2:52
11.	"Grapefruit—Juicy Fruit"	Buffett	A White Sport Coat and a Pink Crustacean	2:58
12.	"Boat Drinks"	Buffett	Volcano	2:38
13.	"Volcano"	Buffett, Keith Sykes, Harry Dailey	Volcano	3:38

== Charts ==
=== Weekly charts ===
1985 chart performance for Songs You Know by Heart
Chart (1985)	Peak position
US Top Country Albums (Billboard)	27
US Billboard 200	100

2023 chart performance for Songs You Know by Heart
Chart (2023)	Peak position
Canadian Albums (Billboard)	44
US Billboard 200	4

=== Year-end charts ===
Year-end chart performance for Songs You Know by Heart
Chart (2018)	Position
US Top Country Albums (Billboard)	95
