= Don't Stop the Carnival =

Don't Stop the Carnival may refer to:

- Don't Stop the Carnival (novel), a 1965 novel by American writer Herman Wouk
- Don't Stop the Carnival (Jimmy Buffett album), 1998
- Don't Stop the Carnival (Sonny Rollins album), 1978
- "Don't Stop the Carnival" (song), a song by the Alan Price Set from 1968
