= A White Sport Coat and a Pink Crustacean =

Studio album by Jimmy Buffett
- Released: June 4, 1973 (LP); October 26, 1987 (CD)
- Studios: Glaser Sound (Nashville, Tennessee)
- Genres: Country; Gulf and Western
- Length: 36:06
- Label: Dunhill
- Producer: Don Gant

Jimmy Buffett chronology
High Cumberland Jubilee (1971)	A White Sport Coat and a Pink Crustacean (1973)	Living and Dying in 3/4 Time (1974)

Singles from A White Sport Coat and a Pink Crustacean
- 1. "The Great Filling Station Holdup" b/w "Why Don't We Get Drunk" Released: April 1973; 2. "Grapefruit-Juicy Fruit" b/w "I Have Found Me a Home"" Released: July 1973; 3. "He Went to Paris" b/w "Peanut Butter Conspiracy" Released: October 1973

A White Sport Coat and a Pink Crustacean is the third studio album by American singer-songwriter Jimmy Buffett. It was released on June 4, 1973, as his first album for Dunhill.

The title of the album is a play on the country song "A White Sport Coat and a Pink Carnation" by Marty Robbins, and it contains several of what later became Buffett's most popular songs. The album was recorded at outlaw country singer Tompall Glaser's recording studio in Nashville, Tennessee. It marks the first reference to Buffett's backup band as "The Coral Reefer Band" and is the first album on which long-time Coral Reefers Michael Utley and Greg "Fingers" Taylor play.

== Chart performance ==
The album reached number 43 on the Billboard Top Country Albums chart, but did not make the Billboard 200 album chart, his last major release not to make that chart. The single of "The Great Filling Station Holdup" reached number 58 on the Billboard Hot Country Singles chart and "Grapefruit Juicy Fruit" was number 23 on the Billboard Easy Listening chart.

== Songs ==
All of the songs on A White Sport Coat and a Pink Crustacean were written or co-written by Buffett.

The most well-known song of the album, the novelty "Why Don't We Get Drunk (and Screw)", was originally released as a B-side, backing the single "The Great Filling Station Holdup", and inspired some controversy at the time due to its lyrics. Buffett wrote "Why Don't We Get Drunk", but is credited under the pseudonym Marvin Gardens, derived from a property on the original Atlantic City version of the Monopoly game board.

"He Went to Paris", inspired by musician Eddie Balchowsky, is a perennial fan-favorite ballad, appearing on most of Buffett's greatest-hits collections. It was covered by Waylon Jennings in 1980 and Doug Supernaw in 1994. Buffett re-recorded it for his 2003 compilation Meet Me in Margaritaville: The Ultimate Collection.

Buffett and Jerry Jeff Walker co-wrote "Railroad Lady". Walker recorded the song a year earlier than Buffett, and it was later further popularized by Lefty Frizzell, Merle Haggard, and Willie Nelson.

== Critical reception ==
Professional ratings
Review scores
Source	Rating
AllMusic	4/5 stars
Billboard	(positive)
Christgau's Record Guide	B
The Rolling Stone Record Guide	3/5 stars

Although it was not successful commercially at the time of its release, A White Sport Coat and a Pink Crustacean is generally considered one of Buffett's better albums. Johnny Loftus of AllMusic argues that "while it still lies much closer to Nashville than Key West," the album "does begin to delineate the blowsy, good-timin' Key West persona that would lead him to summer tour stardom" and is "highly recommended for Buffett completists and those interested in his more introspective side."

== Track listing ==
=== LP record and compact disc ===
All tracks written by Jimmy Buffett, except where noted.

Side A:
No.	Title	Writer(s)	Length
1.	"The Great Filling Station Holdup"		3:02
2.	"Railroad Lady"	Buffett; Jerry Jeff Walker	2:46
3.	"He Went to Paris"		3:29
4.	"Grapefruit—Juicy Fruit"		2:57
5.	"Cuban Crime of Passion"	Buffett; Tom Corcoran	3:42
6.	"Why Don't We Get Drunk"	Marvin Gardens	2:43

Side B:
No.	Title	Length
1.	"Peanut Butter Conspiracy"	3:43
2.	"They Don't Dance Like Carmen No More"	2:57
3.	"I Have Found Me a Home"	3:58
4.	"My Lovely Lady"	3:10
5.	"Death of an Unpopular Poet"	3:39

=== Compact cassette ===
Side A:
No.	Title	Writer(s)	Length
1.	"The Great Filling Station Holdup"	Buffett	3:02
2.	"Cuban Crime of Passion"	Buffett; Corcoran	3:42
3.	"I Have Found Me a Home"	Buffett	3:58
4.	"Death of an Unpopular Poet"	Buffett	3:39
5.	"Peanut Butter Conspiracy"	Buffett	3:43

Side B:
No.	Title	Writer(s)	Length
1.	"Railroad Lady"	Buffett; Walker	2:46
2.	"He Went to Paris"	Buffett	3:29
3.	"Why Don't We Get Drunk"	Marvin Gardens	2:43
4.	"Grapefruit—Juicy Fruit"	Buffett	2:57
5.	"They Don't Dance Like Carmen No More"	Buffett	2:57
6.	"My Lovely Lady"	Buffett	3:10

== Personnel ==
The Coral Reefer Band:

- Jimmy Buffett – lead vocals, acoustic rhythm guitar
- Steve Goodman – acoustic lead guitar
- Reggie Young – electric lead guitar
- Doyle Grisham – pedal steel guitar
- Ed "Lump" Williams – bass guitar
- Mike Utley – piano
- Greg "Fingers" Taylor – harmonica
- Sammy Creason – drums
- Phil Royster – congas
- Johnny Gimble – fiddle
- Shane Keister – Moog synthesizer
- Vassar Clements – fiddle
- Ferrell Morris – percussion
- Marvin Gardens – maracas and beer cans
- Sand Key Chorale (Jimmy Buffett, Don Gant, Buzz Cason) – background voices
- The Buffetts, Carol Montgomery, and Diane Harris – background voices

== Singles ==
- "The Great Filling Station Holdup" b/w "Why Don't We Get Drunk" (Released on Dunhill D-4348 in April 1973)
- "Grapefruit Juicy Fruit" b/w "I Have Found Me a Home" (Released on Dunhill D-4359 in July 1973)
- "He Went to Paris" b/w "Peanut Butter Conspiracy" (Released on Dunhill D-4372 in October 1973)
