= Christmas Island (Jimmy Buffett album) =

Studio album by Jimmy Buffett
- Released: October 8, 1996
- Recorded: June–August 1996
- Studio: Javelina (Nashville, Tennessee)
- Genre: Country rock; Christmas; Gulf and Western
- Length: 43:31
- Label: Margaritaville Records, MCA; MCAD-11489 (U.S., CD)
- Producer: Michael Utley; Russ Kunkel

Jimmy Buffett chronology
Banana Wind (1996)	Christmas Island (1996)	Don't Stop the Carnival (1998)

Christmas Island is Jimmy Buffett's first Christmas album and is his twenty-first studio album overall. It features covers of popular Christmas songs in Buffett's musical stylings as well as two tracks which Buffett wrote for the album. "Twas the Night Before Christmas" is a hidden track. It was his last release with MCA Records.

== Critical reception ==
Reviews tend to be mixed for the album. In a positive review, a reviewer states that "Christmas Island will have you on your feet all through the holidays." Rob O'Connor states that "this may not be the traditional Christmas fare of chestnuts roasting on an open fire, but for those who enjoy ocean breezes and 'wasting away' to this most successful beach bum, Christmas Island is exactly what the cruise director ordered." Thom Owens presents a more negative view of the album, describing Buffett as being "relaxed and entertaining" even though, "few of his new Christmas songs are remarkable and his rearrangements of classic carols are rather forced." However, several tracks remain very popular around the Christmas season. "Ho Ho Ho & a Bottle of Rum" was the track chosen to be played live for promoting the album when first released, and seems to remain the most popular off the album. Although no singles were released, "Jingle Bells", "Mele Kalikimaka", "Ho Ho Ho & a Bottle of Rhum", "Merry Christmas, Alabama (Never Far from Home)" and the title track get considerable amount of radio airplay during the season.

== Track listing ==
No.	Title	Writer(s)	Length
1.	"Christmas Island"	Lyle Moraine	2:55
2.	"Jingle Bells"	James Pierpont	3:50
3.	"A Sailor's Christmas"	Jimmy Buffett; Roger Guth	5:05
4.	"Happy Xmas (War Is Over)"	John Lennon	5:35
5.	"Up on the House Top"	Traditional	3:35
6.	"Mele Kalikimaka"	Robert Alexander Anderson	2:57
7.	"Run Rudolph Run"	Johnny Marks; Marvin Brodie	2:33
8.	"Ho Ho Ho & a Bottle of Rhum"	Roger Guth; Peter Hagen Mayer; Jimmy Buffett; Russ Kunkel	4:05
9.	"I'll Be Home for Christmas"	Kim Gannon; Walter Kent; Buck Ram	4:01
10.	"Merry Christmas, Alabama (Never Far from Home)"	Buffett; Matt Betton	4:08

Hidden track (begins at 5:07 of track 10)
No.	Title	Writer(s)	Length
11.	"A Visit from St. Nicholas"	Clement Clarke Moore	3:14
Total length:			41:58

== Personnel ==
Adapted from AllMusic.

Vocals and musicians

- Jimmy Buffett – lead vocals, guitar; backing vocals (uncertain)
- Melanie Prestidge – backing vocals
- Claudia Cummings – backing vocals
- Tina Gullickson – backing vocals
- Nadirah Shakoor – backing vocals
- Robert Greenidge – steelpan, percussion
- Roger Guth – drums
- Ralph MacDonald – percussion
- Jim Mayer – bass, upright bass
- Peter Mayer – backing vocals, guitar, ukulele
- Tom Mitchell – saxophone
- Greg "Fingers" Taylor – harmonica
- Michael Utley – keyboards

Production and design

- Alvin Booth – photography
- Jimmy Buffett – arranger
- Milton Dean – photography
- Rob Eaton – engineer, Audio mixing|mixing
- Joe Hayden – second engineer
- Abi Hodes – photography
- Ted Jensen – mastering
- Russ Kunkel – producer
- Joe Lizzi – second engineer
- John Lovell – horn arrangements
- Tom Mitchell – horn arrangements
- Jean Pagliuso – photography
- Michael Ramos – production coordination
- Sunshine Smith – coordination
- Michael Utley – arrangements, producer, string arrangements
- Brad Wilson – photography

== Charts ==
=== Weekly charts ===
Chart (1996–97)	Peak position
US Billboard 200	27
US Top Catalog Albums (Billboard)	12
US Top Holiday Albums (Billboard)	4

=== Year-end charts ===
Chart (1997)	Position
US Billboard 200	183
