= Eddie Balchowsky =

American poet

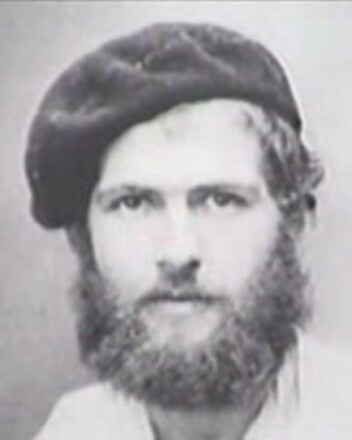
- Born: Edward Ross Balchowsky; February 16, 1916; Frankfort, Illinois, U.S.
- Died: November 27, 1989 (aged 73); Chicago, Illinois, U.S.
- Burial place: Forest Home Cemetery, Forest Park, Illinois
- Occupations: Poet, artist, musician, composer
- Known for: Veteran of the Abraham Lincoln Brigade
- Children: Elizabeth, Reana
- Military career
- Allegiance: Spanish Republic
- Branch: International Brigades
- Service years: 1937–1938
- Unit: The "Abraham Lincoln" XV International Brigade
- Conflicts: Spanish Civil War (WIA)

Edward "Eddie" Ross Balchowsky (February 16, 1916 – November 27, 1989) was an American poet, artist, musician and composer who served in the Abraham Lincoln Brigade during the Spanish Civil War. He was an important figure in the Chicago arts scene, and five well-known singer-songwriters wrote songs inspired by him – Jimmy Buffett, Loudon Wainwright III, Utah Phillips, Skip Haynes and Dion DiMucci.

== Early life ==
Balchowsky was born in 1916 in Frankfort, Illinois, a community located 30 miles south of Chicago that was largely settled by individuals from a German ethnic background. His parents emigrated to the United States from their native Lithuania prior to World War I and opened a grocery.

His was the only Jewish family in Frankfort and during World War I they faced hostility from many of the town's largely German residents due to their open support of American forces fighting against Germany. Balchowsky was bullied by schoolmates and others for being Jewish, which he later stated was one of his primary reasons for volunteering to fight against fascism in Spain.

After graduating from high school, Balchowsky attended the University of Illinois and The Art Institute of Chicago, intending to become a professional concert pianist. During his college years, he made friends with political leftists who made him aware of growing fascism and antisemitism in Germany and Spain. He took an interest in leftist politics on campus, but denied being political and rejected political parties and ideological labels.

== Volunteer in Spain ==
After Spanish general Francisco Franco led a fascist military coup against the left-wing Republican government of Spain, the Republicans sought foreign volunteers to join their fight. Balchowsky felt a kinship to the Spanish people, likening the antisemitic bullying he experienced as a child to the oppression they would face if Franco prevailed. As a result, he joined the American contingent of the International Brigades, known as the Abraham Lincoln Brigade (ALB) or the “Lincolns” for short.

Once in Spain, Balchowsky joined the Republican Cultural Committee producing Republican radio broadcasts from Madrid. During this period, he met and came to admire a number of British volunteers who were lending their talents as writers, artists and musicians. He told author Studs Terkel that he chose to spend most of his time in Spain with the British units because he admired and respected the creativity of the members.

While serving with the British Battalion, Balchowsky served as a reconnaissance scout and an observer along the Ebro River. In September 1937, a fascist sniper shot him in the right wrist, a wound that would necessitate amputating his right hand and most of his forearm. He continued to serve as a reconnaissance scout following his injury.

As 1938 ended, the Republic was losing the war and sought to negotiate an armistice with the nationalists. As part of that effort, it ordered the international brigades to be sent home. Balchowsky sailed aboard the SS Harding and arrived back in the States on December 31, 1938.

== Chicago bohemian lifestyle ==
Balchowsky's return to civilian life in Chicago was challenging. His amputation ended his dreams of becoming a concert pianist, and the cause he fought for in Spain had been soundly defeated. Balchowsky also experienced phantom pain from his missing hand and forearm, and he self-medicated with alcohol and opiates.

Despite his injury, he continued to play the piano. He re-learned to play with only one hand, and he was able to arrange songs, including classical works by Chopin and Beethoven, so he could play them one-handed. He also adapted his own one-handed versions of international leftist anthems. In addition to playing the piano, Balchowsky wrote poetry, drew, painted. He helped make ends meet by selling his paintings and drawings, as well as performing with other musicians. Balchowsky was a friend and collaborator to many of the writers and artists who lived in Chicago or passed through, especially those who frequented or performed at the Quiet Knight, a folk music club where Balchowsky got a job as a janitor so that he would have access to their grand piano.

His lifestyle led to multiple arrests by the Chicago Police Department on minor charges, but a serious drug charge led to a conviction and a two-year prison sentence. While incarcerated, Balchowsky befriended Paul Crump, a Black man who had been sentenced to death for killing a security guard in the armed robbery of a Chicago meatpacking plant in 1953. Crump was a fledgling author, and Balchowsky helped Crump edit his writing and led a successful campaign, through the prison newsletter, to convince the warden to provide Crump with a typewriter. Crump would release the semi-autobiographical best-selling novel Burn, Killer, Burn in 1962. That book helped convince Illinois Gov. Otto Kerner to commute Crump's sentence and ultimately led to his release on parole in 1993.

In 1984 Balchowsky was featured in the film documentary The Good Fight: The Abraham Lincoln Brigade in the Spanish Civil War (1984).

In 1986, Balchowsky and other veterans of the Abraham Lincoln Brigade gathered for a reunion in Spain. He gave a speech to the assembled about his reasons for volunteering to fight and the pride he felt in his service to Spanish democracy. He stated, "Though I went home with one hand, I gained much more than I lost.”

In 1988 Balchowsky published a memoir, As You Pass Each Fence and Door. Interviews with him were also included in multiple films about Americans who had served in Spain. Diane Weyermann produced in 1989 a mini-documentary about Balchowsky, entitled Peat Bog Soldier.

Balchowsky was a charismatic and influential figure. Folk singer Utah Phillips wrote "Eddy's Song" about Balchowsky, and Jimmy Buffett said Balchowsky was an inspiration to him, in general, and specifically inspired the song "He Went to Paris".

== Death ==
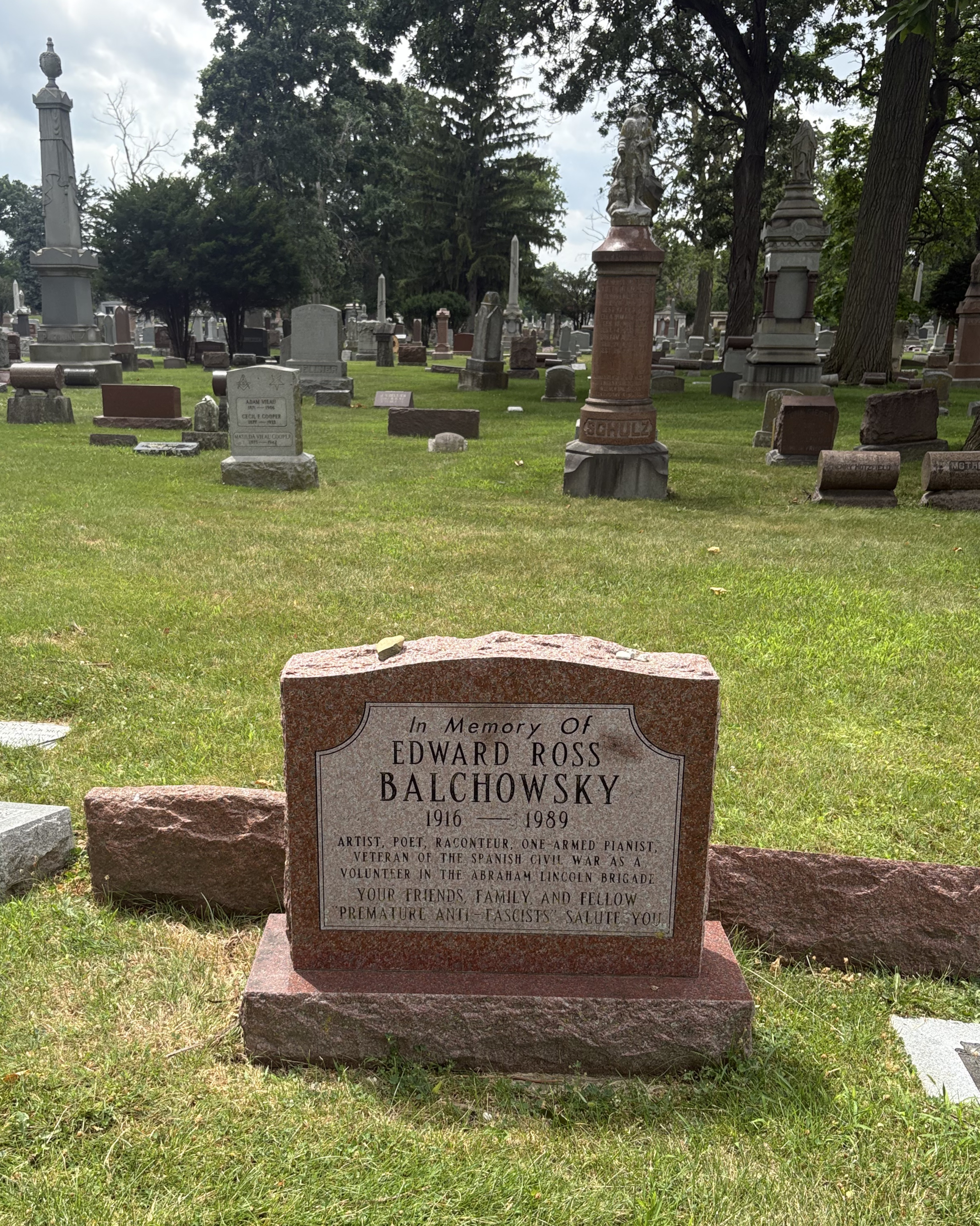
Balchowsky's grave at Forest Home Cemetery

Balchowsky died in 1989 in Chicago after being hit by a CTA subway train in what some have speculated was a suicide. He was survived by two daughters, Elizabeth and Reana, and three grandchildren. He was 73.

The Associated Press quoted Terkel as saying when Balchowsky died, "To me, he was Lazarus. Eddie had lived about seven different lives. A number of times we thought he had died and he'd show up again, usually with younger and younger girls."

Balchowsky is buried in Forest Home Cemetery near Chicago. He was initially buried without a grave marker, but his cousin Jeff Balch and the Chicago Friends of The Abraham Lincoln Brigade raised money to buy one.
