= Foltx =

Vitamin supplement

Foltx is a vitamin supplement containing a combination of vitamin B6 (pyridoxine), vitamin B12 (cyanocobalamin), and folic acid (folacin). It may be used to treat hyperhomocysteinemia, a medical condition.
