= Savannah Buffett =

American radio personality (born 1979)

Savannah Jane Buffett (born June 1, 1979, in Aspen, Colorado) is an American radio personality.

== Early life ==
Savannah is the eldest daughter of Jimmy Buffett. When she was eight years old, Savannah wrote two children's books along with her father. In 1990, she was one of her father's back-up singers in his 1990 music video "Jamaica Farewell". She attended Pitzer College, then moved to Los Angeles to launch a career in music. There, she lived with members of Maroon 5 and Phantom Planet.

== Career ==
In 2006, Buffett was the musical supervisor for the motion picture Hoot, for which her father wrote the soundtrack.

Buffett hosts the "Savannah Daydreamin" radio show broadcast online and on SiriusXM as of 2021, part of Radio Margaritaville.

She also runs her own apparel brand, A1A, inspired by her father's 1974 album by the same name.

== Personal life ==
In November 2021, she sold her house on Belle Meade Island in Upper Eastside, Miami, for $2.85 million; she bought the home in 2006 for $1.375 million. She is married to Joshua.
