= Don't Stop the Carnival (novel) =

Book by Herman Wouk

- First edition
- Author: Herman Wouk
- Cover artist: Janet Gasson
- Language: English
- Publisher: Doubleday
- Publication date: 1965
- Publication place: United States
- Pages: 395
- OCLC: 25632993

Don't Stop the Carnival is a 1965 novel by American writer Herman Wouk. It is a satirical comedy about escaping from New York and a middle-age crisis to an idyllic island in the Caribbean, a heaven that quickly turns into a hell for the main character. The novel was turned into a short-lived musical and later an album by Jimmy Buffett (1997).

== Plot ==
Don't Stop the Carnival revolves around the lead character, Norman Paperman. He is a middle-aged New York City press agent who leaves the noise and narrowly focused life of the big city and runs away to a (fictional) Caribbean island to reinvent himself as a hotel keeper. The result is a satirical tale of naivety, financial ineptitude, disaster and disillusionment.

The novel takes place on the fictional island of Amerigo. According to the opening of the musical (a paraphrased excerpt from the novel):

Kinja was the name of the island when it was British. The actual name was King George III Island, but the islanders shortened that to Kinja. Now the names in the maps and guidebooks is Amerigo, but everybody who lives there still calls it Kinja. The United States acquired the island peacefully in 1940 as part of the shuffling of old destroyers and Caribbean real estate that went on between Mr. Roosevelt and Mr. Churchill. The details of the transaction were, and are, vague to the inhabitants. The West Indian is not exactly hostile to change, but he's not much inclined to believe in it. Meantime, in a fashion, Amerigo was getting American-ized; the inflow of cash was making everybody more prosperous. Most Kinjans go along cheerily with this explosion of American energy in the Caribbean. To them, it seems a new, harmless, and apparently endless carnival.

== Background ==
This book is based on Herman Wouk's experiences in the Virgin Islands in the early 1960s in Saint Thomas, U.S. Virgin Islands. The story centers around the fictional experiences of a New York advertising executive, not Wouk himself. The hotel referred to in the book was the Royal Mail Inn on Hassel Island, located in Charlotte Amalie Harbour. In this novel, Wouk relates stories of happenings, some perhaps fictional and some actual, that he observed while living on St. Thomas, "where the carnival never stops".

== Adaptations ==
The novel was turned into a short-lived musical, and later an album by Jimmy Buffett in 1997. Buffett referred to the development of the musical in his memoir of an aeronautical circumnavigation of the Caribbean shortly after his fiftieth birthday, A Pirate Looks at Fifty.
