= Jimmy Buffett =

American singer-songwriter (1946–2023)

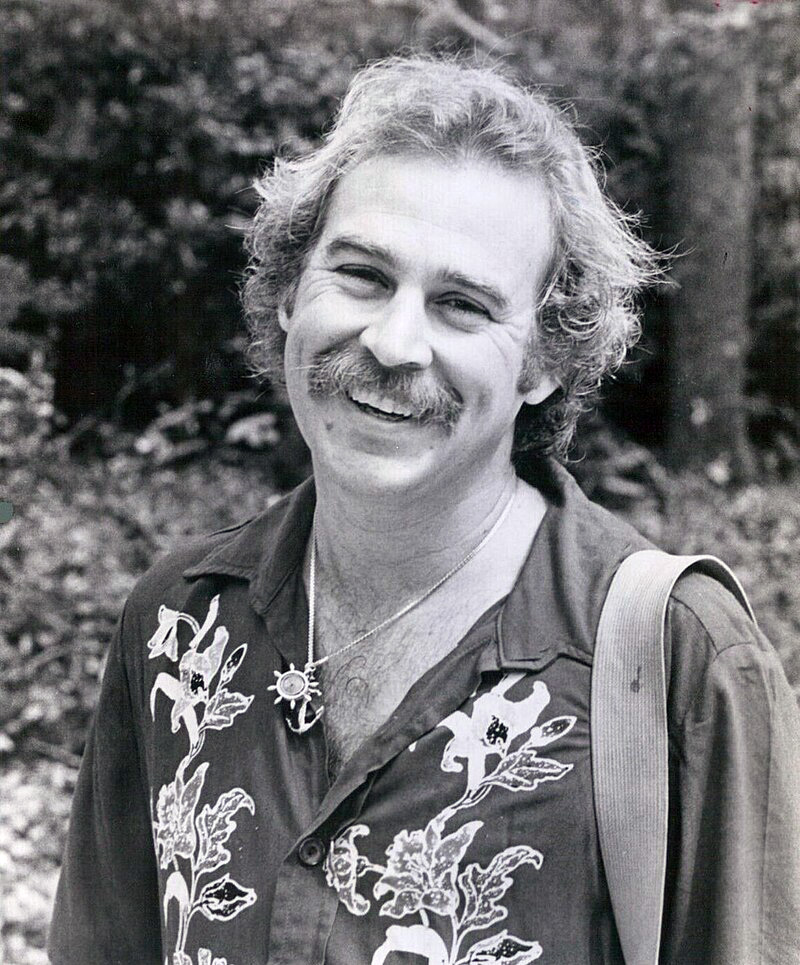
- Buffett in 1980
- Born: James William Buffett; December 25, 1946; Pascagoula, Mississippi, U.S.
- Died: September 1, 2023 (aged 76); Sag Harbor, New York, U.S.
- Education: University of Southern Mississippi (BA)
- Occupations: Singer-songwriter; musician; author; businessman
- Years active: 1961–2023
- Spouses: Margie Washichek (m. 1969; div. 1972); Jane Slagsvol (m. 1977)
- Children: 3, (Note: 1 adopted) including Savannah
- Musical career
- Origin: Nashville, Tennessee, U.S.
- Genres: Gulf and Western; country; country rock; folk rock; calypso; easy listening; pop
- Instruments: Vocals; guitar; ukulele; trombone; keyboards; harmonica
- Works: Jimmy Buffett discography
- Labels: Barnaby; ABC; Dunhill; MCA; Margaritaville; Island Def Jam; PolyGram; Mailboat
- Website: jimmybuffett.com

James William Buffett (December 25, 1946 – September 1, 2023) was an American singer-songwriter, author, and businessman. He was known for his tropical music sound blending country, rock, folk, calypso, and his persona, which often portrayed a lifestyle described as "island escapism." It promoted enjoying life and following passions. Buffett recorded many hit songs, including those known as "The Big 8": "Margaritaville" (1977), which is ranked 234th on the Recording Industry Association of America's list of "Songs of the Century"; "Come Monday" (1974); "Fins" (1979); "Volcano" (1979); "A Pirate Looks at Forty" (1974); "Cheeseburger in Paradise" (1978); "Why Don't We Get Drunk" (1973); and "Changes in Latitudes, Changes in Attitudes" (1977). His other popular songs include "Son of a Son of a Sailor" (1978), "One Particular Harbour" (1983), and "It's Five O'Clock Somewhere" with Alan Jackson (2003). Buffett formed the Coral Reefer Band in 1975.

Of over 30 albums released by Buffett, eight are certified gold and nine others are certified platinum or multi-platinum by the RIAA. He sold over 20 million certified records worldwide. In addition to two Grammy Award nominations, Buffett was posthumously inducted into the Rock and Roll Hall of Fame in Cleveland, Ohio in the Musical Excellence category in 2024.

Buffett parlayed the "island escapism" lifestyle of his music into several business ventures including the Jimmy Buffett's Margaritaville restaurant chain, the Cheeseburger in Paradise restaurant chain which is defunct, and ventures in hotels, casinos, liquor, and retirement communities. He was a bestselling author. Buffett's estate was estimated to be worth $275 million. His devoted fans are known as "Parrotheads".

== Early life ==
Buffett was born on December 25, 1946, in Pascagoula, Mississippi and lived for part of his childhood in Mobile and Fairhope, Alabama. He was the son of Mary Lorraine (née Peets; died September 25, 2003) and James Delaney Buffett Jr. (died May 1, 2003), who worked for the United States Army Corps of Engineers. He had two younger sisters, Laurie (born 1948) and Lucy (born 1953). As a child, he was exposed to sailing: his grandfather, James Delaney Buffett, was a steamship captain from Newfoundland, and his father was a marine engineer and sailor—these experiences later influenced his music. He was educated by Jesuits as a Catholic and served as an altar boy.

In 1961, after seeing a folk music ensemble perform in Biloxi, Mississippi, Buffett realized that he wanted to be a musician. His first performance was a month later at a hootenanny, where he played a Stella guitar. He attended St. Ignatius Catholic School in Mobile, where he played the trombone in the school band at eight in the 1950s. He graduated from McGill Institute (a high school) in the city in 1964.

Buffett enrolled at Auburn University in Auburn, Alabama and was taught how to play guitar by a Sigma Pi fraternity brother to "garner attention from girls". He flunked out of Auburn after a year, in April 1966, "unable to balance his newfound interests in music and girls with his college classes". In 1966, Buffett played acid rock in a band called the Upstairs Alliance which attempted to emulate the sound of Jefferson Airplane. He continued college at Pearl River Community College in Poplarville, Mississippi and the University of Southern Mississippi in Hattiesburg and earned a bachelor's degree in history in 1969, where during his time there he also joined the Kappa Sigma fraternity. In college, Buffett worked in a shipyard as an electrician and welder. He avoided serving in the Vietnam War due to a college deferment, and a failed physical exam.

== Music career ==
After graduating in 1969, Buffett moved to New Orleans and often held street performances for tourists on Decatur Street. Additionally, he played for drunken crowds in the former Bayou Room nightclub on Bourbon Street. In 1970, he moved to Nashville to further his country music career. Buffett did not have much luck with music jobs but found work as an editorial assistant for Billboard, where he was the first to report that the bluegrass duo Flatt and Scruggs had disbanded. He signed a two-album contract with Barnaby Records. He released his first album, the country-tinged folk rock record Down to Earth, in August 1970; it sold 324 copies. The masters of his second album, High Cumberland Jubilee, were recorded in 1971 in Berry Hill, Tennessee. They were allegedly lost by the label before the album was released, although they were found in 1976, after Buffett became popular.

In the fall of 1971, after an impromptu audition, Buffett was hired by the Exit/In, a Nashville club, as the opening act for recording artist Dianne Davidson. Unhappy with the business climate in Nashville and with his first marriage heading for divorce, Buffett accepted an offer by fellow country singer Jerry Jeff Walker, whom he had met while working as a journalist in Nashville, for lodging in his house in Coconut Grove. In November 1971, they went to Key West on a busking expedition; Buffett liked it so much that he moved there in the spring of 1972. There, Buffett got involved in the literary scene, meeting writers Thomas McGuane (who married Buffett's sister), Jim Harrison, Tom Corcoran, and Truman Capote; sex and drugs were plentiful. Buffett was hired by David Wolkowsky, playing for drinks at the Chart Room Bar in the Pier House Motel. There, Buffett met his second wife. From a connection he made there, Buffett was hired as the first mate on the yacht of industrialist Foster Talge, heir to The Rival Company, which became his day job. In 1973, Buffett signed a recording contract with ABC/Dunhill Records, then run by Don Gant. After Jim Croce died in a plane crash in September 1973, Dunhill promoted Buffett as a replacement.

Buffett's second release and his first on ABC/Dunhill was A White Sport Coat and a Pink Crustacean, recorded at Tompall Glaser's Glaser Sound recording studio on Music Row and released in June 1973. The album featured the hit singles "Grapefruit—Juicy Fruit" and "Why Don't We Get Drunk" as well as "I Have Found Me a Home", written about his experiences in Key West. Buffett used the money he made from the album to buy his first boat. Living & Dying in 3/4 Time, recorded in October 1973 and released in February 1974, deviated from the island-theme of Buffett's other albums. It included "Come Monday", written for his then-girlfriend and future wife, his first single to place on the Billboard Hot 100. A1A, released in December 1974, included "A Pirate Looks at Forty", written about a drug smuggler. In 1975, Buffett formed the Coral Reefer Band. He credits his future wife for cleaning up their look, replacing their ripped Levi jeans and collarless shirts. The band was the opening act for the Eagles in August 1975.

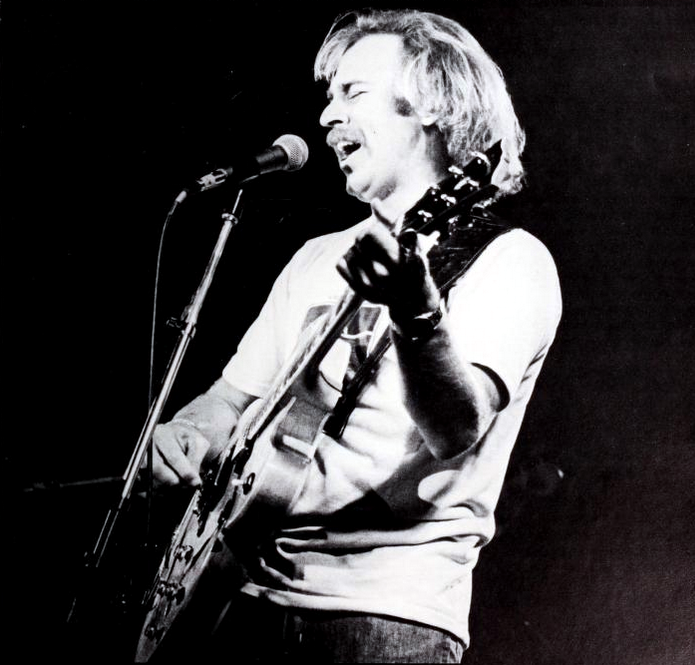
Buffett performing at Clemson University in 1977

Havana Daydreamin', produced by Don Gant, was released in January 1976. In January 1977, Buffett released Changes in Latitudes, Changes in Attitudes, which, in addition to the title track, featured his breakthrough hit song "Margaritaville". Buffett claims that he wrote most of the song in six minutes. Ironically, while it attempts to negatively portray tourists in Key West, it led to an increase in tourism to the city. That year, Buffett sublet his apartment in Key West to Hunter S. Thompson.

Buffett first traveled to Saint Barthélemy in 1978 and moved there shortly thereafter, where he got the inspiration for songs and characters in his books. In March 1978, Buffett released Son of a Son of a Sailor. In addition to the title track, it featured "Cheeseburger in Paradise", which reached number 32 on the Hot 100. In August 1979, he released Volcano, which included "Fins" and the title track.

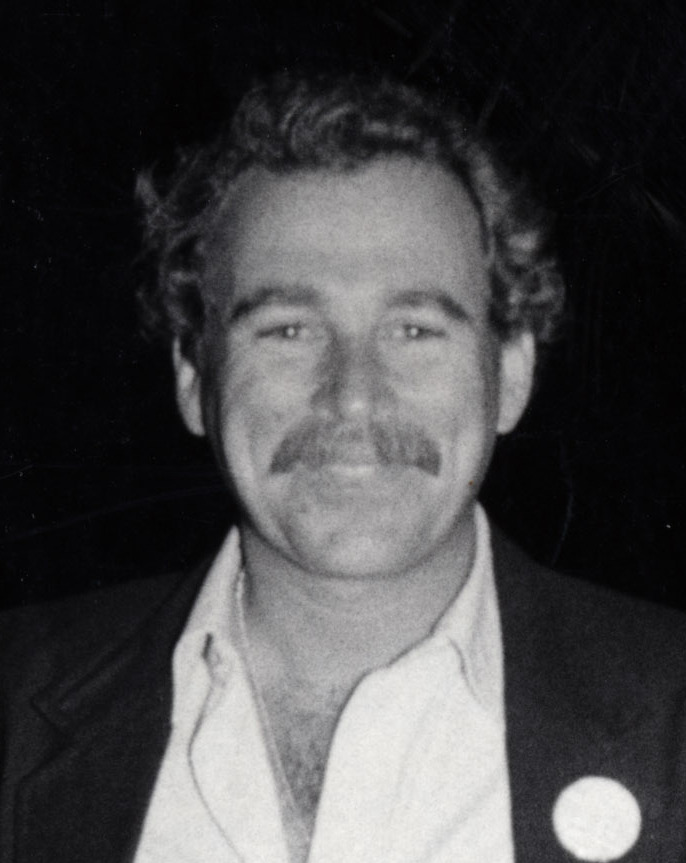
Buffett in 1980

In 1983, Buffett filed and won a lawsuit against Chi-Chi's for attempting to trademark "Margaritaville" as a drink special. In October 1985, he released the compilation album Songs You Know By Heart, which included all of the "Big Eight" songs and was his best-selling album, selling over 7 million copies by 2005. In 1994, Buffett duetted with Frank Sinatra on a cover of "Mack the Knife" on Sinatra's final studio album, Duets II. In 1996, Buffett penned the song "Jamaica Mistaica" for his Banana Wind album based on a January 1996 incident in which Buffett's Grumman HU-16 airplane named Hemisphere Dancer was shot at by Jamaican police, who believed the craft to be smuggling marijuana. The aircraft sustained minimal damage. The plane was carrying Buffett as well as Bono of U2, Bono's wife and two children, Island Records producer Chris Blackwell, and co-pilot Bill Dindy. The Jamaican government acknowledged the mistake and apologized to Buffett.

In April 1998, Buffett released an album of songs from a musical theatre production he co-created based on Herman Wouk's novel, Don't Stop the Carnival; the album was certified gold. After Frank Sinatra died the following month, he attended his funeral. Buffett's song "Math Suks", released in May 1999, was condemned by the U.S. National Council of Teachers of Mathematics and the National Education Association for its alleged negative effect on children's education. Comedian Jon Stewart also jokingly criticized the song on The Daily Show during a segment called "Math Is Quite Pleasant".

By 1999, Buffett had shifted to a more relaxed concert schedule of around 20–30 dates per year, with infrequent back-to-back nights, preferring to play only on Tuesdays, Thursdays, and Saturdays. This schedule provided the title of his 1999 live album. In 2003, Buffett partnered in a partial duet with Alan Jackson for the song "It's Five O'Clock Somewhere", which spent a then record eight weeks atop the Hot Country Songs charts. This song won the 2003 Country Music Association Award for Vocal Event of the Year, Buffett's first award in his 30-year recording career. Buffett's album License to Chill, released on July 13, 2004, sold 238,500 copies in its first week of release according to Nielsen Soundscan. With the album, Buffett topped the U.S. pop albums chart for the first time in his career.

In May 2005, Buffett signed an agreement with Sirius Satellite Radio to broadcast Radio Margaritaville, which, from its founding in 1998, was broadcast only online. The channel broadcasts from the Margaritaville Resort Orlando in Kissimmee, Florida. In August 2006, Buffett released the album Take the Weather with You, which hit number 1 on the country chart. The album included "Breathe In, Breathe Out, Move On", written in honor of the survivors of Hurricane Katrina. In August 2007, Buffett was nominated at the Country Music Association Awards for the Event of the Year Award for his song "Hey Good Lookin'" which also features Alan Jackson and George Strait. Also in August 2007, Buffett received a star on the Mohegan Sun Walk of Fame.

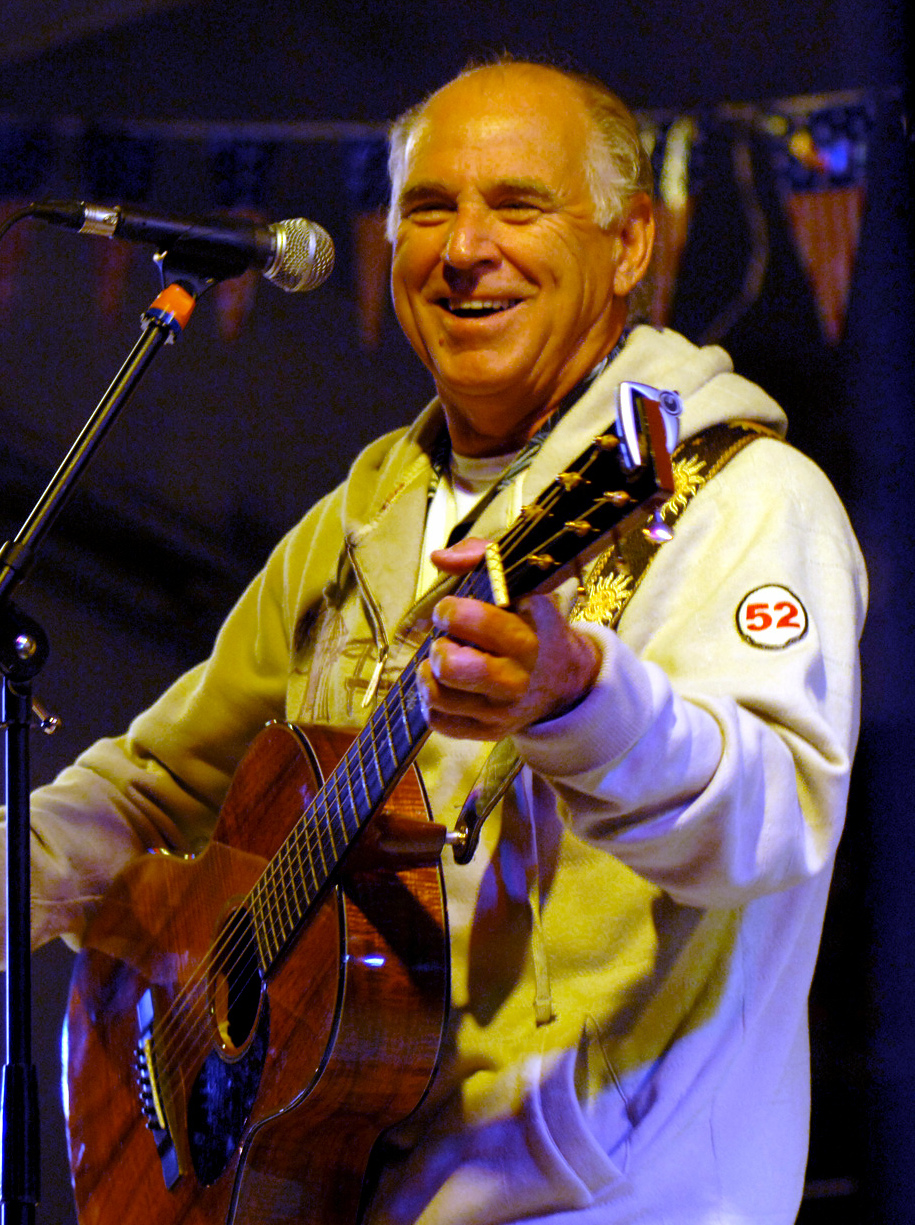
Buffett performing in January 2008

In April 2010, a double CD of performances recorded during the 2008 and 2009 tours called Encores was released exclusively at Walmart, Walmart.com, and Margaritaville.com. In 2010, Buffett was named the tenth biggest touring artist of the decade, with 4.5 million ticket sales over the previous 10 years. Since Wyatt Durrette, co-writer of the song "Knee Deep", was a fan of Buffett's, Buffett partnered on the song with the Zac Brown Band, which was released on Brown's 2010 album You Get What You Give. The single was certified platinum in September 2017.

In November 2011, Buffett voiced Huckleberry Finn on Mark Twain: Words & Music, a benefit for the Mark Twain Boyhood Home & Museum, which was released on Mailboat Records. In August 2013, Buffett released Songs from St. Somewhere; many of the songs were recorded at Eden Rock, St Barths.

In 2020, Buffett released Songs You Don't Know by Heart, a fan-curated collection of his lesser-known songs rerecorded on his collection of notable guitars. Buffett performed his final full concert at Snapdragon Stadium in San Diego on May 6, 2023. He made two further concert appearances, as an unannounced guest at concerts by Coral Reefer Band members, in Amagansett, New York, on June 11 and in Portsmouth, Rhode Island, on July 2, his final live performance before his death. Equal Strain on All Parts was released posthumously in November 2023. Buffett got the idea for the album title from his grandfather's description of a nap. Buffett was posthumously selected for induction into the Rock and Roll Hall of Fame in 2024 in the musical excellence category.

=== Musical style ===
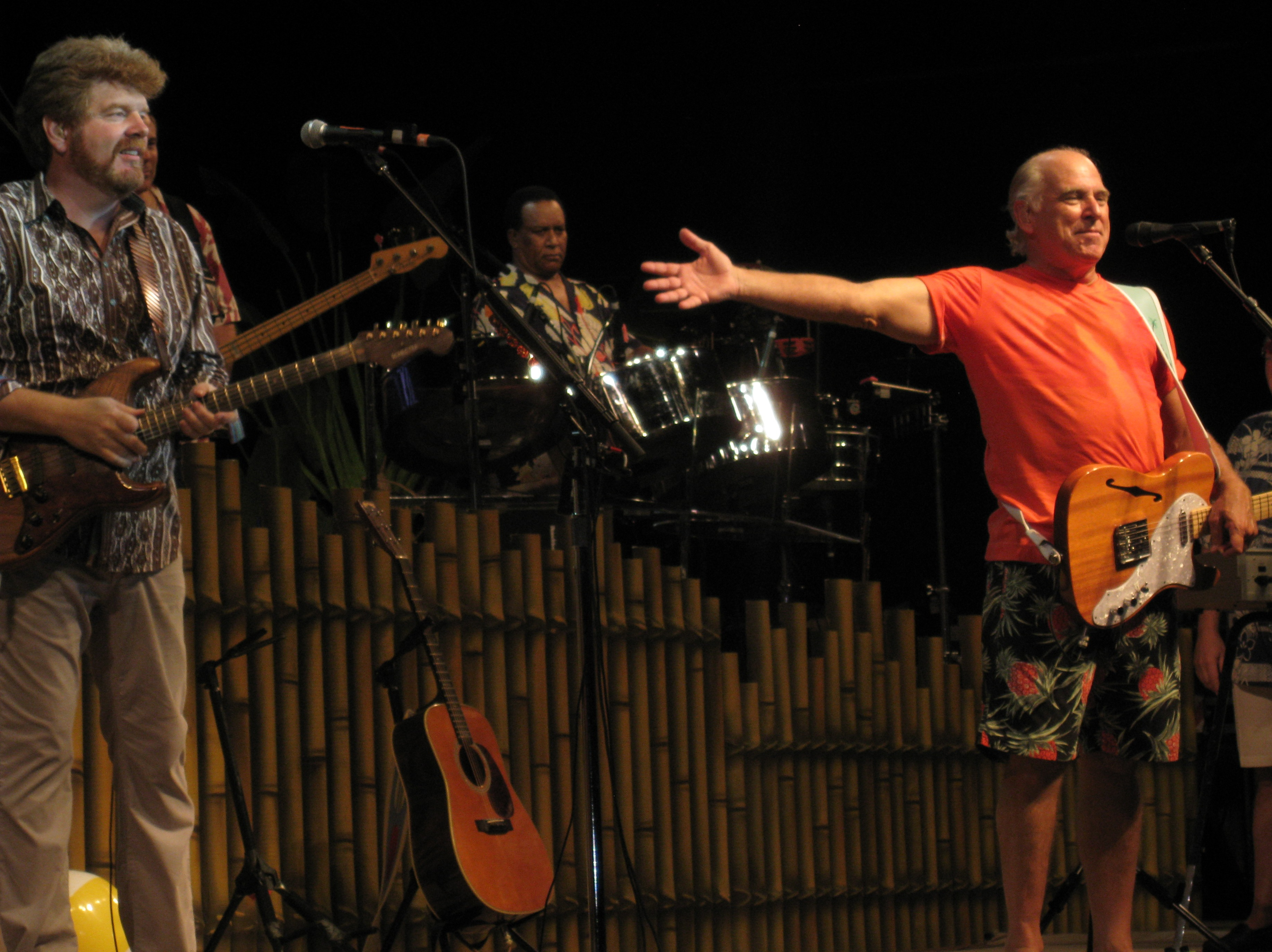
Buffett (right) performing in 2009

Buffett's music combined country, rock, folk, calypso, and pop music with coastal as well as tropical lyrical themes for a sound sometimes called "gulf and western”.

Buffett said his music is "drunken Caribbean rock 'n' roll". He has also described his music as follows:

It's pure escapism is all it is...I'm not the first one to do it, nor shall I probably be the last. But I think it's really a part of the human condition that you've got to have some fun. You've got to get away from whatever you do to make a living or other parts of life that stress you out. I try to make it at least 50/50 fun to work and so far it's worked out.

In 1989, a music critic in The Washington Post described Buffett's music as a combination of "tropical languor with country funkiness into what some [have] called the Key West sound, or Gulf-and-western." The name "Gulf-and-western" derives from elements in Buffett's early music including musical influence from country, along with lyrical themes from the coast of the Gulf of Mexico. It is a play on the form of "Country & Western" and Gulf+Western is the former parent company of Paramount Pictures.

In 2020, The Associated Press described Buffett's sound as a "special Gulf Coast blend of country, pop, folk and rock, topped by Buffett's swaying voice. Few can mix steelpans, trombones and pedal steel guitar so effortlessly."

=== Musical legacy ===
Musicians that have cited Buffett as a musical influence include Greg "Fingers" Taylor, a former member of Buffett's Coral Reefer Band, as well as musicians that have "latched on to his seaside-and-booze themes" such as Kenny Chesney, Alan Jackson, and Zac Brown.

=== "Parrot Head" fans ===
Parrot Head or parrothead is a commonly used nickname for Buffett fans, with "parakeets" or "keets" used for younger fans, or children of Parrotheads. At a 1985 Jimmy Buffett concert at the Timberwolf Amphitheater at Kings Island in Mason, Ohio, Buffett commented about everyone wearing Hawaiian shirts and parrot hats and how they kept coming back to see his shows, just like Deadheads. Timothy B. Schmit, then a member of the Coral Reefer Band, coined the term "Parrot Head" to describe them. In 1989, the first Parrothead club was founded in Atlanta. The annual Meeting of the Minds in Key West, Florida is a five-day festival held after Fantasy Fest that attracts approximately 5,000 Parrotheads. The Pikes Peak Hash House Harriers and Harriettes have an annual Parrot Head Hash weekend hosted by Yeastee Boy and Bread Box. Buffett's fanbase is composed mostly of baby boomers. His concerts were known for tailgate parties and alcohol consumption.

== Writing ==
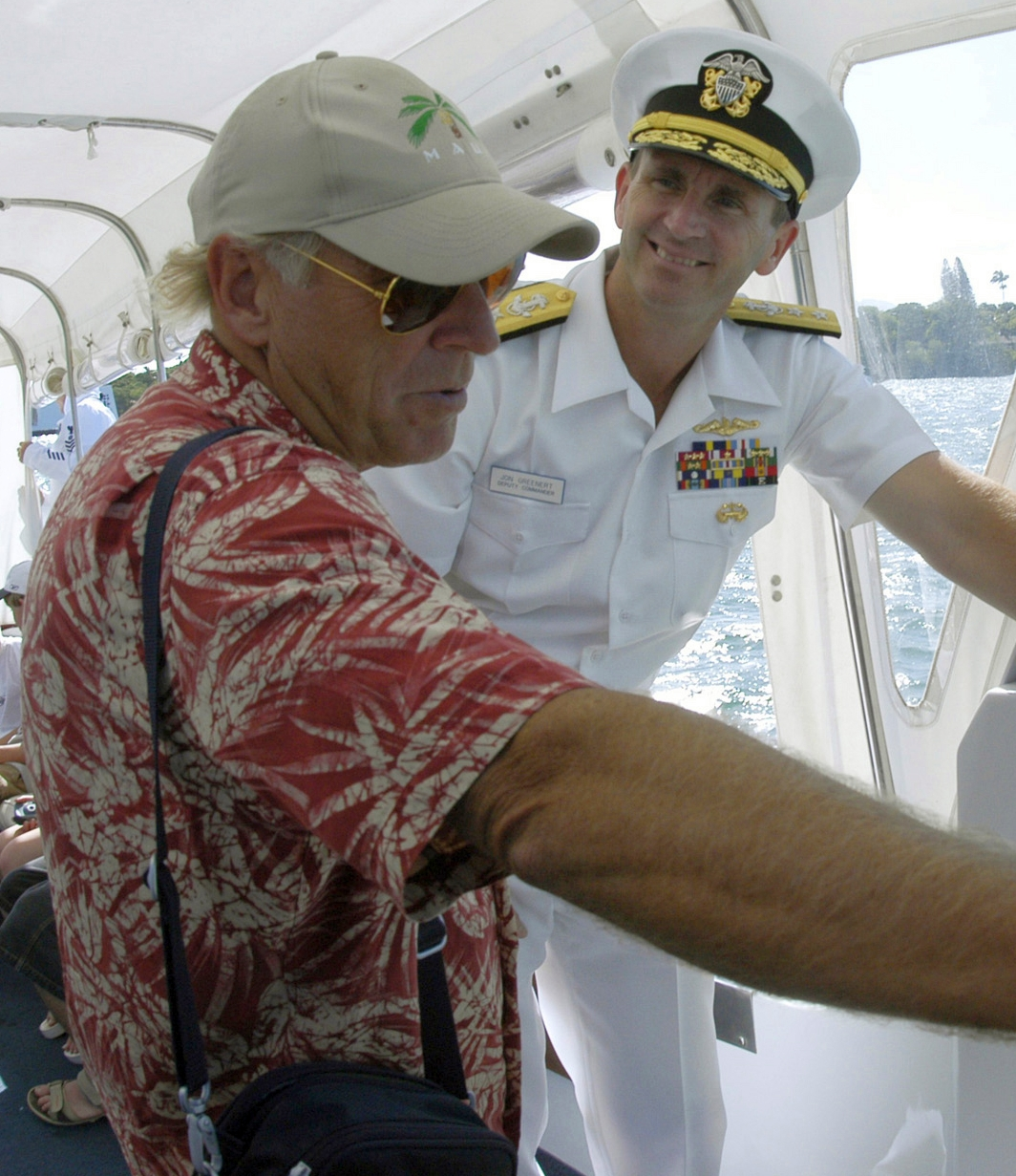
Buffett in Hawaii in June 2003

Buffett wrote three books, all of which placed on The New York Times Best Seller list. Tales from Margaritaville and Where Is Joe Merchant? both spent over seven months on The New York Times Best Seller fiction list. His memoir A Pirate Looks at Fifty, published in 1998, went straight to number one on the New York Times Best Seller nonfiction list, making him one of the few authors to have reached number one on both the fiction and nonfiction lists.

Buffett also co-wrote two children's books, The Jolly Mon and Trouble Dolls, with his eldest daughter, Savannah Buffett. The original hardcover release of The Jolly Mon included a cassette tape recording of the two reading the story accompanied by an original score written by Michael Utley.

Buffett's novel A Salty Piece of Land was released on November 30, 2004, and the first edition of the book included a CD single of the song "A Salty Piece of Land." The book was a New York Times best seller soon after its release.

Buffett's last title, Swine Not?, was released on May 13, 2008.

== Film and television ==
=== Soundtracks ===
Buffett wrote the soundtrack for, co-produced, and played a role in, the 2006 film Hoot, directed by Wil Shriner and based on the book by Carl Hiaasen, which focused on issues important to Buffett, such as conservation. The film was not a critical or commercial success.

In 1990 he contributed the song, "Don't Bug Me" to the Arachnophobia soundtrack. Among his other film music credits are the theme song to the short-lived 1993 CBS television series Johnny Bago; "Turning Around" for the 1985 film Summer Rental starring John Candy; "I Don't Know (Spicoli's Theme)" for the 1982 film Fast Times at Ridgemont High; "Hello, Texas" for the 1980 John Travolta film Urban Cowboy; and "If I'm Gonna Eat Somebody (It Might As Well Be You)" for the animated film FernGully: The Last Rainforest, which was sung in the film by rap artist Tone Loc.

=== Cameo appearances ===
Buffett made cameo appearances in Repo Man, Hook, Cobb, Hoot, Congo, and From the Earth to the Moon. He also made cameo appearances as himself in Rancho Deluxe (for which he also wrote the music) and in FM.

Buffett appeared on the Sesame Street special, Elmopalooza, singing "Caribbean Amphibian" with Kermit the Frog.

Buffett portrayed helicopter pilot Frank Bama in seven episodes of the 2010 reboot of Hawaii Five-0, from 2011 to 2020.

Buffett made a cameo in the 2015 film Jurassic World, where he is seen holding two margaritas while the dinosaurs are set loose in the park.

In 2017, Buffett was the musical guest on the NCIS: New Orleans episode "Rogue Nation", playing the song "I Will Play for Gumbo" in Dwayne Pride's (Scott Bakula) newly rebuilt bar. His final TV appearance saw him busking the same tune on a New Orleans sidewalk to Beth (Amy Schumer) and her fiancée in the 2024 Life & Beth episode "Who Dat?"

In 2019, Buffett had an extended cameo playing himself in the Harmony Korine film The Beach Bum.

Buffett portrayed both himself and a con artist pretending to be him, in an episode of the CBS police procedural series Blue Bloods, which aired in January 2022.

== Theater ==
In 1994, Buffett began developing a musical based on Herman Wouk's 1965 novel, Don't Stop the Carnival. Buffett wrote the music and lyrics and Wouk wrote the book for the show. Don't Stop the Carnival debuted in Miami, Florida, in 1997 to negative reviews from critics. The show ran only for six weeks in Miami.

Escape to Margaritaville, a musical, ran at the La Jolla Playhouse in San Diego from May 2017 to July 2017. The show then performed limited runs in New Orleans, Houston, and Chicago, and was well received by critics. The show features a book by Greg Garcia and Mike O'Malley and uses Buffett's classic songs, some of which he rewrote the lyrics to in order to better fit in the context of the story. The show began previews at the Marquis Theatre on Broadway on February 16, 2018, and officially opened on March 15 under the direction of Tony winner Christopher Ashley. The Broadway production received mixed reviews from New York critics and closed on July 1 after 29 previews and 124 regular performances. A national tour launched in Providence, Rhode Island, in the fall of 2019.

== Business ventures ==
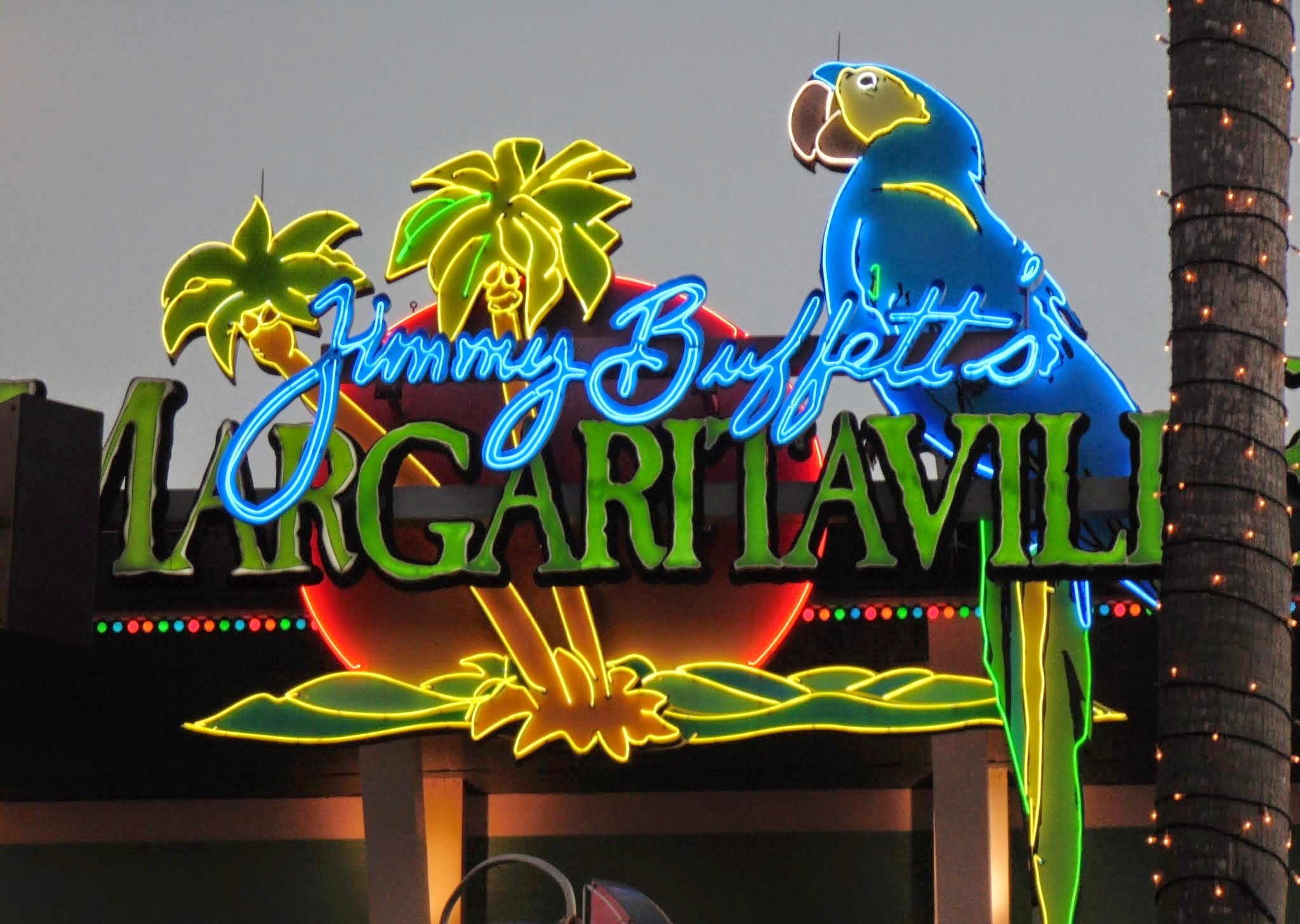
The outside of a Margaritaville restaurant in Orlando, Florida

Buffett took advantage of the tropical "island escapism" lifestyle that fans of his music sought by launching several business ventures to sell this lifestyle to his fans. Through his Margaritaville brand, Buffett licensed hotels, casinos, cruise experiences, restaurants and bars, packaged foods, beverages, spirits, outdoor furniture, home goods, appliances, and apparel and accessories.

=== Restaurants ===
In 1984, Buffett and a friend opened a T-shirt shop and expanded it into the first Margaritaville Cafe, in Gulf Shores, Alabama. After it failed, in 1985, they tried again in Key West, expanding it to what became Jimmy Buffett's Margaritaville in 1987. The chain opened restaurants under the Margaritaville and LandShark Bar & Grill names in locations including Atlantic City, New Orleans, Nashville, the Cayman Islands, The Bahamas, Turks and Caicos, Las Vegas, Jamaica, Orlando, and Baltimore. The Margaritaville cafe on the Las Vegas strip was possibly the highest grossing restaurant in the U.S.

Buffett previously owned the Cheeseburger in Paradise Restaurant chain, founded in 2002 in partnership with Bloomin' Brands; it was sold to Luby's for $11 million in 2012 and shut down in 2020.

=== Record labels ===
In 1992, Buffett launched Margaritaville Records, with distribution through MCA Records. His MCA record deal ended in 1996. In 1999, he started Mailboat Records to release live albums.

=== Beer ===
Buffett sought and received a concert sponsorship from Corona; the partnership was credited for increasing sales of the brand. After deciding that he wanted his own beer brand, Buffett partnered with Anheuser-Busch in 2006 to brew Landshark Lager, now one of the Anheuser-Busch brands.

=== Casinos ===
In 2013, Buffett partnered with the Resorts Casino Hotel in Atlantic City, New Jersey, to open the $35 million Jimmy Buffett Margaritaville-themed entertainment complex at the hotel, which included a Margaritaville Restaurant with a giant blender and tiki bar, a Landshark Bar and Grill, the 5 O'Clock Somewhere Bar, a coffee shop, a retail store, and a gaming area with 12 Margaritaville-themed table games and 160 slot machines.

The Margaritaville Casino and Restaurant in Biloxi, Mississippi, licensed the name from Buffett; it was in operation from May 2012 to September 2014. Plans to bring a Buffett-themed casino to Biloxi had been in process since 2000.

=== Sports ===
From May 8, 2009, through January 5, 2010, the home stadium of the Miami Dolphins, now called Hard Rock Stadium, was named LandShark Stadium pursuant to an eight-month naming rights deal. Buffett also wrote new lyrics for the team to his 1979 song "Fins", which is played during Dolphins home games.

As a baseball fan, Buffett was part-owner of two minor-league teams: the Miami/Fort Myers Miracle (1989–2014) and the Madison Black Wolf (1996–2000).

=== Video games ===
In 2012, a "Margaritaville Online" game was released by THQ for Facebook. The game was discontinued two years later. In 2016, Buffett partnered with FunPlus to develop a new Margaritaville game.

=== Retirement communities ===
In 2017, Latitude Margaritaville, a 3,900-home $1 billion retirement village near Interstate 95 in Daytona Beach, Florida, was announced by Buffett in partnership with Minto Group. The partnership announced similar retirement communities on Hilton Head Island, South Carolina, also in 2017 and in Panama City Beach, Florida, in 2021.

=== Cannabis ===
In September 2018, Buffett teamed with Wrigley Company heir William Wrigley Jr. II's Surterra Holdings to license "Coral Reefer" brand marijuana; it launched in April 2019. The brand licensing ended in April 2023.

=== Berkshire Hathaway ===
In the 1980s, Buffett became friends with Warren Buffett and a shareholder in Berkshire Hathaway, increasing his stake over the years. They called each other "Cousin Jimmy" and "Uncle Warren" though they were not related.

== Charity work ==
=== Environmental conservation ===
In 1981, the Save the Manatee Club, a 501(c)(3) organization, was founded by Buffett and former Florida governor Bob Graham. In 1986, Buffett began work to introduce the "Save the Manatee" license plate, featuring an image of a West Indian manatee, with proceeds going to the Save the Manatee Club. Buffett was also a major donor to the Gulf Specimen Marine Laboratory.

In 1987, Buffett lobbied for the reauthorization of the Endangered Species Act of 1973.

=== Charity performances ===
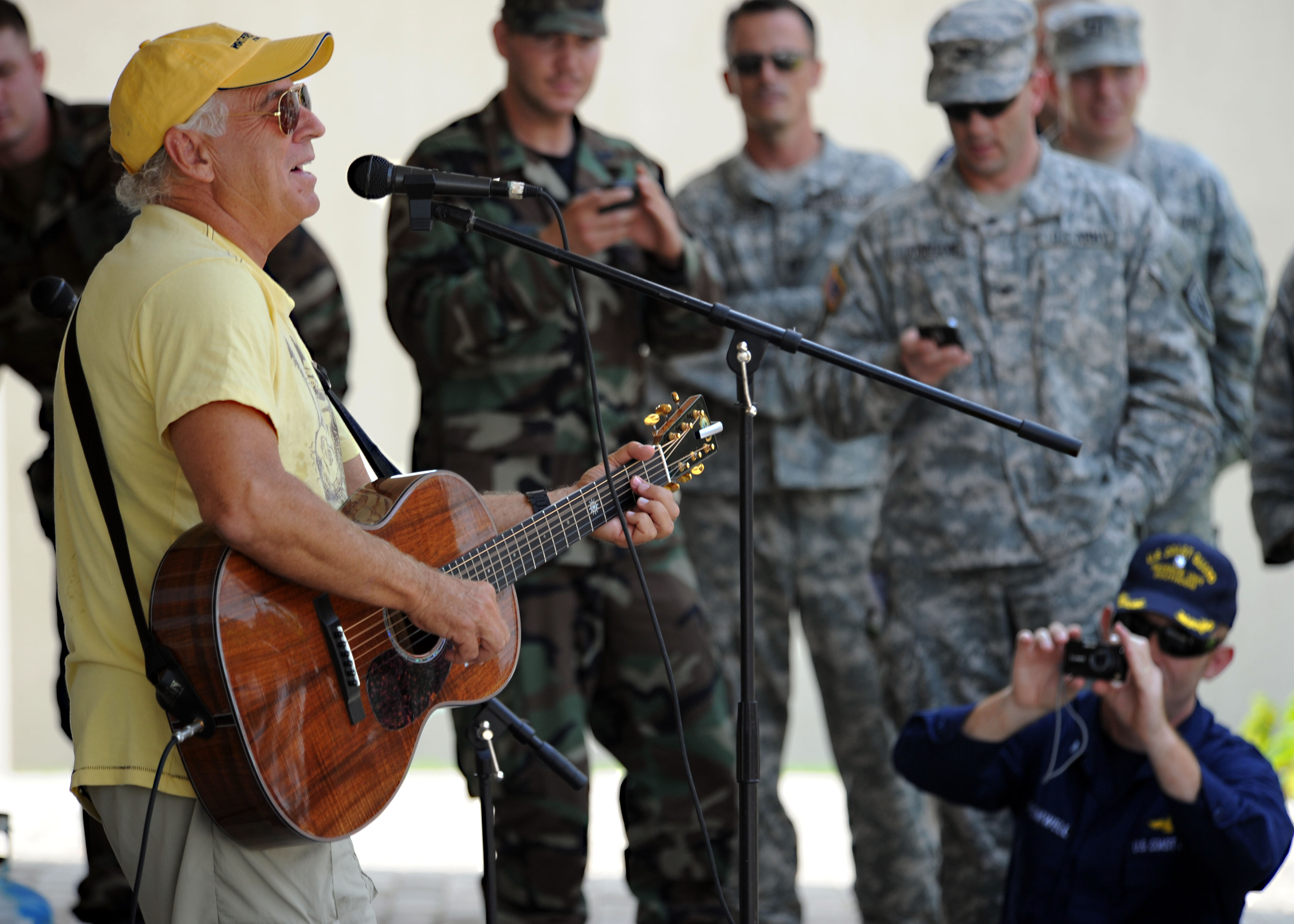
Buffett performing for members of the Joint Task Force Haiti behind the U.S. Embassy in Port-au-Prince following the 2010 Haiti earthquake

Buffett enjoyed playing for U.S. troops; he played at the Guantanamo Bay Naval Base in 2002.

Buffett performed at several hurricane relief concerts including the Surviving the Storm hurricane relief concert in November 2004, which raised funds to support relief efforts for the four major hurricanes that year: Hurricane Charley, Hurricane Frances, Hurricane Ivan, and Hurricane Jeanne and a hurricane relief concert in November 2017 with Kenny Chesney and Toby Keith.

In January 2008, Buffett performed a concert in Hong Kong that raised funds for the Foreign Correspondents' Club Charity Fund to support needy children.

On July 11, 2010, along with Jesse Winchester and Allen Toussaint, Buffett, a Gulf Coast native, performed a free concert for 35,000 people on the beach in Gulf Shores, Alabama to draw tourism to the area in the aftermath of the Deepwater Horizon oil spill. Buffett changed some of the lyrics of his songs to reference the environmental disaster.

=== Disaster relief ===
After the 2010 Haiti earthquake, Buffett brought tents via his seaplane to donate to those that lost their homes.

In the aftermath of Hurricane Irma, Buffett sent private planes to help ferry supplies and gave a benefit concert in Gustavia, Saint Barthélemy.

== Personal life ==
Buffett married Margie Washichek in 1969; they divorced in 1972. Buffett met his second wife, Jane (née Slagsvol), then a student at the University of South Carolina, at the Chart Room bar while she was visiting Key West on spring break; she never returned to the university. They were married in 1977 in Aspen, Colorado. The Eagles, for whom Buffett was the opening act in 1975, played at their wedding. The couple had two daughters, radio personality Savannah Buffett (born 1979) and filmmaker Sarah Delaney (born 1992), and an adopted son, Cameron Marley (born 1994). They split in the early 1980s due to their partying lifestyle but reconciled in 1991 after she became sober.

Buffett resided in a waterfront estate in Sag Harbor, New York. In September 1998, he sold his properties in Key West for $900,000. In 2010, Buffett sold his house in Palm Beach, Florida, to Jon Stryker for $18.5 million; he had bought the house in 1994 for $4.4 million. At that time, he also owned a 2-unit property in the area, which he purchased in 2002 for $802,000. In 2013, Buffett purchased another house in Palm Beach, with 3,100 square feet, for $1.3 million. In April 2014, he bought a 4,322 square foot house in Beverly Hills, California for $8.25 million. In 2020, Buffett sold a 4,783-square-foot house in Palm Beach for $6.9 million; he had paid $4.95 million for it in 2011. Buffett also owned a home in Saint Barthélemy, where he lived on and off in the early 1980s. There, Buffett was part owner of the Autour de Rocher hotel and restaurant. It was closed by local police and burned down shortly after (the story of the hotel is chronicled in the song "Autour Du Rocher" on Buffett's 2002 Far Side of the World album). He also owned an apartment in the Deutsche Bank Center in New York City.

Buffett was an avid pilot and owned a Dassault Falcon 900 jet that he often used while on concert tours and during his travels. At various points, he also owned a Boeing Stearman, Cessna Citation, Lake Amphibian, Pilatus PC-12, and Grumman Albatross. While attempting to take off on August 25, 1994, around 3:00 p.m. Eastern time, Buffett crashed his Grumman G-44 Widgeon into the waters off Nantucket, Massachusetts. The airplane nosed over, and Buffett was able to swim to safety, sustaining only minor injuries.

While Buffett was raised Catholic, he did not practice the religion later in life, though it is speculated to have influenced some of his songwriting.

=== Sports ===
Buffett was a devoted New Orleans Saints fan, having attended the team's first game at Tulane Stadium in 1967. On April 1, 2012, he had Saints head coach Sean Payton serve as an honorary member of the Coral Reefer Band at a concert in New Orleans in protest of Payton's suspension by the National Football League as a result of the New Orleans Saints bounty scandal.

On February 4, 2001, Buffett was ejected from the American Airlines Arena (now the Kaseya Center) in Miami during a basketball game between the Miami Heat and the New York Knicks for cursing. The referee who ejected Buffett apparently did not know who he was, and got upset at Heat coach Pat Riley because he thought Riley—who was trying to explain to him who Buffett was—was insulting him by asking if he had ever been a "Parrothead", the nickname for Buffett fans.

=== Legal issues ===
On October 6, 2006, Buffett was detained by French customs officials in Saint Tropez for allegedly carrying over 100 pills of ecstasy. Buffett's luggage was searched after his Dassault Falcon 900 private jet landed at Toulon-Hyères International Airport. He paid a fine of $300 and was released. A spokesperson for Buffett stated the pills in question were prescription drugs but declined to name the drug or the health problem for which he was being treated. Buffett released a statement that the "ecstasy" was in fact a B-vitamin supplement known as Foltx.

=== Health ===
At a performance by Buffett on January 26, 2011 (Australia Day) at Sydney's Hordern Pavilion, he fell off the stage after an encore and lost consciousness. Coincidentally, Gordian Fulde, a trauma surgeon, was at the concert and close to the stage; Fulde treated Buffett at the scene. Buffett regained consciousness within a few minutes, and was then transported to St. Vincent's Hospital Emergency Centre for treatment and was discharged the next day. Buffett returned to Australia in 2012 for two shows in Brisbane and Melbourne, and made fun of the incident during those shows.

By 2017, Buffett's diet did not include sugar or carbohydrates, except on Sundays, and he no longer smoked marijuana.

=== Politics ===
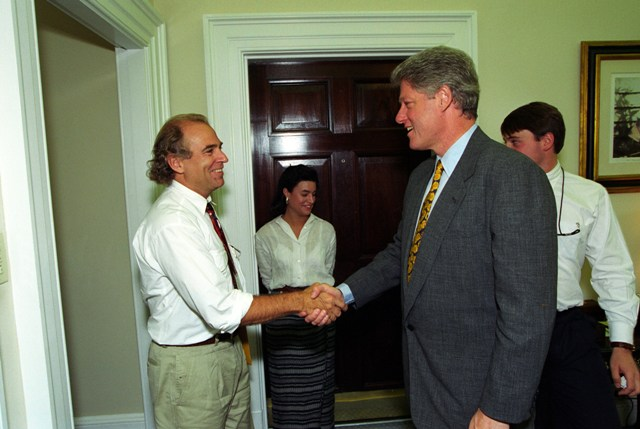
Buffett with US President Bill Clinton in 1993

Buffett was a supporter of the Democratic Party. He sang in Florida for the Bill Clinton 1992 presidential campaign and again for Bill Clinton in the White House in August 2000. Buffett hosted fundraisers for Democratic politicians, including one for Obama in 2008, several for Hillary Clinton in 2016. In 2018, Buffett hosted a concert to support Gwen Graham, daughter of Bob Graham, in the Democratic primary of the 2018 Florida gubernatorial election. In November 2018, he hosted a rally for Florida Democratic candidates Andrew Gillum and Bill Nelson in West Palm Beach, Florida, changing the lyrics of some of his songs to disparage the policies of Rick Scott and Donald Trump. The rally faced some backlash from conservative fans.

=== Illness and death ===
Buffett was diagnosed with Merkel-cell carcinoma, a rare and aggressive skin cancer, in 2019, but kept his illness private and continued to tour while undergoing treatment.

In May 2023, Buffett was hospitalized to "address some issues that needed immediate attention" and rescheduled tour dates. In late August, he entered hospice care and had a final meeting with family and friends.

Buffett died on the evening of September 1, 2023, at age 76, at his home in Sag Harbor, New York. Buffett's estate was estimated to be worth $275 million.

President Joe Biden called Buffett a "music icon". A tribute concert was held at the Hollywood Bowl in April 2024, featuring Paul McCartney, Eagles, Snoop Dogg, Harrison Ford, and Pitbull among others.

In 2025, Buffett's widow, Jane Buffett, sued her co-trustee of the trust that owned her husband's assets for mismanagement.

== Honors ==
In 2015, Buffett spoke at the University of Miami's graduation ceremony and received an honorary doctorate in music. Wearing aviator sunglasses, he told graduates, from a line in his song "The Pascagoula Run", that "it's time to see the world, time to kiss a girl, and time to cross the wild meridian." Also in 2015, Buffett's hometown of Pascagoula, Mississippi named a bridge in his honor, Buffett Bridge.

A species of crustacean discovered in 2023, Gnathia jimmybuffetti, was named after Buffett.

In 2024, the Florida legislature declared August 30 Jimmy Buffett Day, renamed State Road A1A as the Jimmy Buffett Memorial Highway, and issued a commemorative Florida and Margaritaville-themed license plate, to benefit Buffett's charity SFC Charitable Foundation Inc., also known as Singing for Change.

The City of Hattiesburg unveiled their 57th mural in October 2024, titled "Parrots in Paradise." The mural is on Hardy Street and was painted by Gulfport artist Lucinda L'Enfant.

In 2024, Jimmy Buffett was posthumously inducted into the Rock and Roll Hall of Fame. The honor was bestowed by James Taylor, who also sang Buffett's 1974 hit "Come Monday" along with Kenny Chesney and Coral Reefer Band member Mac McAnally. Dave Matthews also performed "A Pirate Looks at Forty".

In 2025, Florida Governor Ron DeSantis posthumously awarded Buffett the Florida Governor's Medal of Freedom, one of the highest civilian honors in the state.

== Discography ==
- Down to Earth (1970)
- High Cumberland Jubilee (1971)
- A White Sport Coat and a Pink Crustacean (1973)
- Living and Dying in 3/4 Time (1974)
- A1A (1974)
- Havana Daydreamin' (1976)
- Changes in Latitudes, Changes in Attitudes (1977)
- Son of a Son of a Sailor (1978)
- Volcano (1979)
- Coconut Telegraph (1981)
- Somewhere over China (1982)
- One Particular Harbour (1983)
- Riddles in the Sand (1984)
- Last Mango in Paris (1985)
- Songs You Know by Heart (1985)
- Floridays (1986)
- Hot Water (1988)
- Off to See the Lizard (1989)
- Boats, Beaches, Bars & Ballads (1992)
- Before the Beach (recorded 1970-71, released 1993)
- Fruitcakes (1994)
- Barometer Soup (1995)
- Banana Wind (1996)
- Christmas Island (1996)
- Don't Stop the Carnival (1998)
- Beach House on the Moon (1999)
- Far Side of the World (2002)
- Meet Me in Margaritaville: The Ultimate Collection (2003)
- License to Chill (2004)
- Take the Weather with You (2006)
- Buffet Hotel (2009)
- Songs from St. Somewhere (2013)
- 'Tis the SeaSon (2016)
- Life on the Flip Side (2020)
- Songs You Don't Know by Heart (2020)
- Equal Strain on All Parts (2023)

== Filmography ==
=== Film ===
Film work by Jimmy Buffett
Year	Title	Role	Notes
1973	Introducing Jimmy Buffett	Himself	Documentary; Short film
1973	Tarpon	Himself	Documentary
1975	Rancho Deluxe	Himself	Also composer
1978	FM	Himself	Cameo appearance
1984	Repo Man	Additional Blond Agent	Cameo appearance
1986	Live by the Bay	Himself	Concert film Also executive producer Direct-to-video
1991	Hook	Shoe-Stealing Pirate	Cameo appearance Uncredited
1994	Cobb	The Armless Guy / Heckler	Double role
1995	Congo	727 Pilot	Cameo appearance
2005	The Aristocrats	Himself	Documentary
2006	Hoot	Mr. Ryan	Also producer and composer
2006	Sun Dogs	—N/a	Documentary; Also producer
2008	Gonzo: The Life and Work of Dr. Hunter S. Thompson	Himself	Documentary
2015	Jurassic World	Running Park Visitor with Margarita Drinks / Himself	Cameo appearance Uncredited
2018	Billionaire Boys Club	Police Captain	Video on demand Limited release
2018	The Wall's Embrace	Himself	Documentary; Short film
2019	The Beach Bum	Himself	Cameo appearance Final film role in appearance
2020	Jimmy Carter: Rock & Roll President	Himself	Documentary
2021	Under the Volcano	Himself	Documentary

=== Television ===
Television work by Jimmy Buffett
Year	Title	Role	Notes
1974	Your Hit Parade	Himself	Episode: "August 9, 1974"
1978	Saturday Night Live	Himself	Episode: "Richard Dreyfuss/Jimmy Buffett, Gary Tigerman"
1981; 1992	The Tonight Show Starring Johnny Carson	Himself	8 episodes
1981	Fridays	Himself	Episode: "2.25"
1982	SCTV Network	Himself	Episode: "Rome, Italian Style"
1977; 1984	Austin City Limits	Himself	3 episodes
1983; 1985	Late Night with David Letterman	Himself	3 episodes
1984	Nashville Now	Himself	Episode: "April 1, 1984"
1989; 2020	Today	Himself	8 episodes
1991	Voices That Care	Himself	Television special
1993	Johnny Bago	—N/a	8 episodes Theme music composer
1994 2008	Late Show with David Letterman	Himself	5 episodes
1995; 2003	The Tonight Show with Jay Leno	Himself	6 episodes
1997	Music for Montserrat	Himself	Television concert special
1998; 2005	Late Night with Conan O'Brien	Himself	3 episodes
1998	Elmopalooza	Himself	Television special
1998	Brian Wilson's Imagination	Himself	Television documentary
1998	From the Earth to the Moon	First Journalist	Unknown episodes
2004; 2005	60 Minutes	Himself	3 episodes
2004; 2006	Live! with Regis and Kelly	Himself	3 episodes
2005; 2013	The Ellen DeGeneres Show	Himself	2 episodes
2009	Late Night with Jimmy Fallon	Himself	Episode: "1.90"
2010	CMT Crossroads	Himself	Episode: "Jimmy Buffett & Zac Brown Band"
2011; 2020	Hawaii Five-0	Frank Bama	Recurring guest star 7 episodes
2014; 2022	The Tonight Show Starring Jimmy Fallon	Himself	3 episodes
2017	NCIS: New Orleans	Himself	Episode: "Rogue Nation"
2017	Magnificent Mile Lights Festival	Himself	Television special
2018	CBS News Sunday Morning	Himself	Episode: "Cheating Hearts/On Broadway/A Moveable Feast/The Envelope Please: Willem Dafoe"
2018	The View	Himself	Episode: "Guest Co-Hostess Ana Navarro/Jimmy Buffett"
2018	Megyn Kelly Today	Himself	Episode: "1.114"
2018	Watch What Happens Live with Andy Cohen	Himself	Episode: "Carol Kane & Jimmy Buffet"
2019	The Late Late Show with James Corden	Himself	Episode: "Matthew McConaughey/Reba McEntire/Jimmy Buffett"
2019	Wheel of Fortune	Himself	3 episodes
2020	Celebrity Page	Himself	Episode: "7.136"
2022	Blue Bloods	Dickie Delaney; Himself	Episode: "On the Arm"
2024	Life & Beth	Street Busker	Episode: "Who Dat?"

== Bibliography ==
Jimmy Buffett was the author of the following books:

- The Jolly Mon (1993), children's book (written with Savannah Jane Buffett, illustrations by Lambert Davis)
- Trouble Dolls (1997), children's book (written with Savannah Jane Buffett, illustrations by Lambert Davis)
- A Pirate Looks at Fifty (2000), memoir
- Tales from Margaritaville (2002), short stories
- Where Is Joe Merchant? (2003), novel
- A Salty Piece of Land (2005), novel
- Swine Not? (2008), novel

== Tours ==
- A Pink Crustacean Tour (1976)
- Changes in Latitudes, Changes in Attitudes Tour (1977)
- Cheeseburger in Paradise Tour (1978)
- You Had to Be There Tour / Volcano Tour (1979)
- A Hot Dog & A Road Map Tour (1980)
- Coconut Telegraph Tour (1981)
- Somewhere over China Tour (with broken leg) (1982)
- Homecoming Tour (1982)
- The Six-Stop American Tour (1983)
- Feeding Frenzy Tour (1984)
- Last Mango in Paris Tour (1985)
- Floridays Tour / World Tour of Florida (1986)
- A Parrot Looks at Forty Tour (1987)
- Cheap Vacation Tour / Hot Water Tour (1988)
- Off to See the Lizard Tour / Buffett Does Ballads Tour (1989)
- Jimmy's Jump Up Tour (1990)
- Outpost Tour (1991)
- Recession Recess Tour (1992)
- Chameleon Caravan Tour (1993)
- Fruitcakes Tour (1994)
- Domino College Tour (1995)
- Banana Wind Tour (1996)
- Havana Daydreamin' Tour (1997)
- Don't Stop the Carnival Tour (1998)
- Beach House on the Moon Tour (1999)
- Tuesdays, Thursdays, Saturdays Tour (2000)
- A Beach Odyssey Tour (2001)
- Far Side of the World Tour (2002)
- Tiki Time Tour (2003)
- License to Chill Tour (2004)
- A Salty Piece of Land Tour (2005)
- Party at the End of the World Tour (2006)
- Bama Breeze Tour (2007)
- Year of Still Here Tour (2008)
- Summerzcool Tour (2009)
- Under the Big Top Tour (2010)
- Welcome to Fin Land Tour (2011)
- Lounging at the Lagoon Tour (2012–13)
- Songs from St. Somewhere Tour (2013–14)
- This One's for You Tour (2014–15)
- Workin' n' Playin' Tour (2015–16)
- I Don't Know Tour (2016–18)
- Son of a Son of a Sailor Tour (2018–19)
- Life on the Flip Side Tour (2021–22)
- Second Wind Tour (2023)
