= Don't Stop the Carnival (Jimmy Buffett album) =

Studio album by Jimmy Buffett
- Released: April 28, 1998
- Recorded: 1:05:32
- Genre: Country rock; Gulf and Western
- Label: Margaritaville; Island
- Producer: Michael Utley

Jimmy Buffett chronology
Christmas Island (1996)	Don't Stop the Carnival (1998)	Beach House on the Moon (1999)

Professional ratings
Review scores
Source	Rating
Allmusic	3/5 stars

Don't Stop the Carnival is the twenty-second studio album by American singer-songwriter Jimmy Buffett. It was released on Margaritaville Records and Island Records on April 28, 1998. It is based on the 1965 novel of the same name written by Herman Wouk. Wouk also worked with Buffett to produce the stage play that lasted only for a short run in Miami, Florida in 1997. The album contains 20 compositions to promote the stage play. It reached #15 in the Billboard 200 albums chart. This was Buffett's first album for Island Records since parting ways with MCA Records in 1996.

== Track listing ==
All tracks are written by Jimmy Buffett.

Track list
No.	Title	Length
1.	"Intro: The Legend of Norman Paperman/Kinja"	7:01
2.	"Public Relations"	3:57
3.	"Calaloo"	3:15
4.	"Island Fever"	4:34
5.	"Sheila Says"	3:55
6.	"Just an Old Truth Teller"	3:34
7.	"Henny's Song: The Key to My Man"	3:10
8.	"Kinja Rules"	3:48
9.	"A Thousand Steps to Nowhere"	5:24
10.	"It’s All About the Water"	2:21
11.	"Champagne Sí, Agua No"	1:44
12.	"Public Relations (Reprise)"	1:25
13.	"The Handiest Frenchmen in the Caribbean"	:50
14.	"Hippolyte's Habitat (Qui Moun' Qui)"	3:10
15.	"Who Are We Trying to Fool?"	4:35
16.	"Fat Person Man"	3:28
17.	"Up on the Hill"	4:10
18.	"Domicile"	0:37
19.	"Funeral Dance"	0:51
20.	"Time to Go Home"	3:33
