= Son of a Son of a Sailor (song) =

Song by Jimmy Buffett

from the album Son of a Son of a Sailor
- Released: March 1978
- Recorded: 1977
- Genre: Country rock; Gulf and Western
- Length: 3:23
- Label: ABC
- Songwriter(s): J. Buffett
- Producer(s): Norbert Putnam

"Son of a Son of a Sailor" is a song written and performed by American popular music singer-songwriter Jimmy Buffett. It is the opening track of the 1978 album of the same name. The song is a fan favorite, although it was not a concert staple until the 2005 Salty Piece of Land tour.

== Live performances ==
Although Buffett had excluded this song at many shows (especially in the mid and late 90s), it has gone through several changes during live performances.

=== You Had to Be There (1978) ===
Buffett's first live album, You Had to Be There opened with an upbeat version of the song. The opening riff was extended about thirty seconds while introductions were being made. The line at the end of the song, "The sea's in my veins, my tradition remains, I'm just glad I don't live in a trailer" was changed to "This cast is no blast, but it's comin' off fast, and I feel like I'm pullin' a trailer". This is a reference to having a broken knee during his performance. Buffett also makes several references to his broken leg throughout the album.

=== Saturday Night Live ===
Buffett and the Coral Reefers chose to play this song during their only appearance on Saturday Night Live. Actor Richard Dreyfuss hosted the show on May 13, 1978. During the performance, Buffett's leg was still broken. He sat on a chair, while his leg cast rested on a boat. This is the same rendition of the version that appears on You Had to Be There.

=== Live By the Bay (1985) ===
Although the track listing doesn't include it, the first two verses of the song was included on the VHS Live By the Bay. This was also done with "Gypsies in the Palace". After performing the final song, "Margaritaville", the band leaves then returns (Buffett with a beer) and starts to play "Son of a Son of a Sailor". Live By the Bay was edited to make the song appear as an encore, but it was actually performed at the beginning of the show between "Door Number 3" and "Grapefruit—Juicy Fruit".

=== Buffett Live: Tuesdays, Thursdays, Saturdays (1999) ===
While the song was performed during the tour that his second live album Feeding Frenzy was featured, the song was excluded from that album. However, a live version was included on the following live release Buffett Live: Tuesdays, Thursdays, Saturdays. The performance was slowed down, having a much closer sound to the studio recording. While it's in the same key, the arrangement was changed significantly, with vocalist Nadirah Shakoor singing the second half of the second verse and couple of corners being cut, particularly the final chorus and outro. Buffett used this arrangement for the rest of his career, and it was featured on the re-recording on Meet Me in Margaritaville: The Ultimate Collection and subsequent live albums.
