= He Went to Paris =

Single by Jimmy Buffett

from the album A White Sport Coat and a Pink Crustacean
- A-side: "He Went to Paris"
- B-side: "The Great Peanut Butter Conspiracy"
- Released: 1973
- Recorded: 1973
- Studio: Glaser Sound (Nashville, Tennessee)
- Genre: Country; Gulf and Western
- Length: 3:27
- Label: Dunhill; D-4385 (US, 7")
- Songwriter: Jimmy Buffett
- Producer: Don Gant

Jimmy Buffett singles chronology
""Grapefruit—Juicy Fruit""	"He Went to Paris"	""Saxophones""

"He Went to Paris" is a song written and performed by American singer-songwriter Jimmy Buffett. It was first released on his 1973 album A White Sport Coat and a Pink Crustacean and was his fourth and final single from that album. Although it never placed on the charts, it became one of his most popular songs, having appeared on several of his greatest hits compilations.

Buffett was inspired to write the song after meeting musician Eddie Balchowsky, a one-armed veteran of the Spanish Civil War he met while playing in Chicago. On the live album You Had to Be There, Buffett mentions this as a favorite song he wrote.

The song appears on Songs You Know By Heart, a greatest hits compilation that includes Buffett's concert favorites ranging from 1973 to 1979. However, "He Went to Paris" was the only song off that album that Buffett rarely played live, until he found out that Bob Dylan likes the song and decided to start playing it on a more frequent basis. Buffett included a live version, recorded in Paris, France in 2009, on his album "Encores".

Outlaw country singer Waylon Jennings covered the song on his 1980 album Music Man.

Country singer Doug Supernaw covered the song on his 1994 album Deep Thoughts From a Shallow Mind.

New Zealand singer Jamie McDell covered the song on her 2018 EP Tori.
