= Margaritaville =

1977 single by Jimmy Buffett

- Cover of the West German 7 " single

Single by Jimmy Buffett

from the album Changes in Latitudes, Changes in Attitudes
- B-side: "Miss You So Badly"
- Released: February 14, 1977
- Recorded: November 1976
- Studio: Criteria (Miami); Quadrafonic Sound (Nashville)
- Genre: Tropical rock; country rock; folk rock; soft rock
- Length: 4:09 (album); 3:20 (single)
- Label: ABC
- Songwriter: Jimmy Buffett
- Producer: Norbert Putnam

Jimmy Buffett singles chronology
"Woman Goin' Crazy on Caroline Street" (1976)	"Margaritaville" (1977)	"Changes in Latitudes, Changes in Attitudes" (1977)

Alternative cover
- 1977 Italian single picture sleeve

Audio sample
- file; help

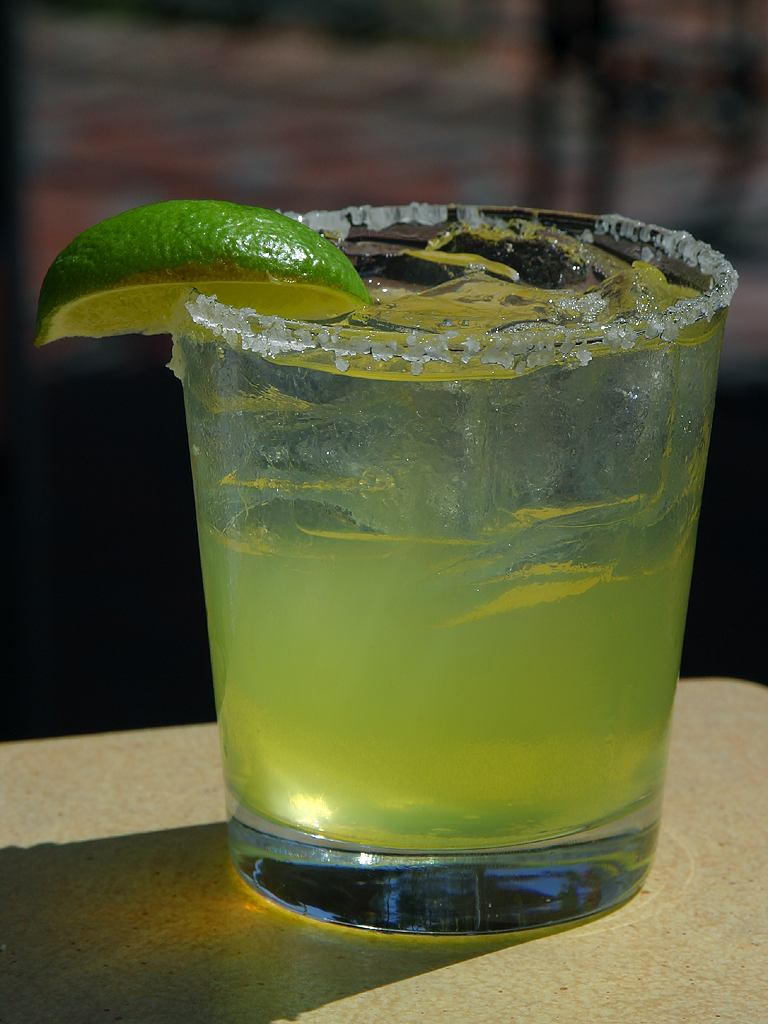
A margarita cocktail: the inspiration for "Margaritaville"

"Margaritaville" is a 1977 song by American singer-songwriter Jimmy Buffett, released on his seventh album, Changes in Latitudes, Changes in Attitudes. In the United States, "Margaritaville" reached number eight on the Billboard Hot 100 chart, and went to number one on the Easy Listening chart, also peaking at No. 13 on the Hot Country Songs chart. Billboard ranked it number 14 on its 1977 Pop Singles year-end chart. It was Buffett's highest charting solo single, and his only top 10 on the Hot 100. After Buffett’s death on September 1, 2023, the song re-entered the Top 40 for the week ending September 16, 2023.

Named for the cocktail margarita, with lyrics reflecting a laid-back lifestyle in a tropical climate, "Margaritaville" has come to define Buffett's music and career. The relative importance of the song to Buffett's career is referred to obliquely in a parenthetical plural in the title of a Buffett greatest hits compilation album, Songs You Know by Heart: Jimmy Buffett's Greatest Hit(s). The name was used in the title of other Buffett compilation albums including Meet Me in Margaritaville: The Ultimate Collection and is also the name of several commercial products licensed by Buffett. The song also lent its name to the 2017 musical Escape to Margaritaville, in which it is featured alongside other Buffett songs. Continued popular culture references to and covers of it throughout the years attest to the song's continuing popularity. The song was mentioned in Alan Jackson's 2003 single "It's Five O'Clock Somewhere", on which Buffett is a featured artist, and in Blake Shelton's 2004 single "Some Beach".

"Margaritaville" has been inducted into the 2016 Grammy Hall of Fame for its cultural and historic significance. In 2023, the song was selected for preservation in the United States National Recording Registry by the Library of Congress as being "culturally, historically, or aesthetically significant." Buffett maintained a resort chain by the same name.

== Origins ==
In an interview with Sound on Sound magazine, producer Norbert Putnam stated Buffett approached him with the concept of an album of light, carefree songs about life by the beach. Putnam encouraged Buffett to record the album at Criteria Studios in Miami, rather than Buffett's usual studio in Nashville, in order to take inspiration from Miami's easygoing beachfront lifestyle. One day during recording, Buffett complained about a bad day he recently had on the beach, which included losing one of his flip-flops on his way home from a bar, cutting his foot on a beer can pop top, and running out of salt for his margarita. Buffett was already working on a set of lyrics about the incident, to which Putnam told him, "That's a terrible idea for a song." A few days later, Buffett played a rough version of the song, then called "Wasted Away Again in Margaritaville," and Putnam and others at the studio realized it had potential as a hit.

== Content ==
The song is about a man spending an entire season at a beach resort community, with three verses that describe his day-to-day activities. In the first verse, he passes his time playing guitar on his front porch and watching tourists sunbathe, all the while eating sponge cake and waiting for a pot of shrimp to boil. In the second verse, he has nothing to show for his time except a tattoo of a woman that he cannot remember getting. In the third and final verse, he steps on a discarded detachable pull-tab, cutting his heel and ruining the flip-flops he is wearing, then returns home to ease his pain with a fresh batch of margaritas. In live performances, Buffet sang "I broke my leg twice, I had to limp on back home".

The three choruses indicate that the narrator is pondering his recent failed romance, and his friends are telling him that his former girlfriend is at fault. The last line of each shows his shifting attitude toward the situation: first "it's nobody's fault," then "hell, it could be my fault," and finally "it's my own damn fault."

Buffett revealed during the recording of an episode of CMT's Crossroads with the Zac Brown Band that "Margaritaville" was actually supposed to be recorded by Elvis Presley, but Presley died the same year the song was released (he declined the offer before the song could be recorded).

=== Lyric confusion ===
There is some confusion as to whether Buffett sings "Wasted away" or "Wastin’ away" in the chorus of the song. The original unedited lyrics, that appear on the record sleeve to the Changes in Latitudes, Changes in Attitudes LP, read "Waistin'" [sic]. Also, most guitar tablature and sheet music read "Wastin'." Buffett never made a statement on the issue. However, he was also known to use "wasted" in some performances, as well as in the video game re-recording for Rock Band.

== Critical reception ==
Record World said that "Buffett turns in a melodic performance that could give him his first big hit." In June 2026, CBS News included the song in its list of the 250 essential American songs of the past 250 years.

== Charts ==
=== Weekly charts ===
1977 weekly chart performance for "Margaritaville"
Chart (1977)	Peak position
Australia (Kent Music Report)	98
Canada Top Singles (RPM)	4
Canada Adult Contemporary (RPM)	1
Canada Country Singles (RPM)	8
New Zealand RIANZ Chart	33
US Billboard Hot 100	8
US Adult Contemporary (Billboard)	1
US Hot Country Songs (Billboard)	13
US Cash Box Top 100	7

2023 weekly chart performance for "Margaritaville"
Chart (2023)	Peak position
Global 200 (Billboard)	114
US Billboard Hot 100	38
US Hot Country Songs (Billboard)	14
US Hot Rock & Alternative Songs (Billboard)	9

=== Year-end charts ===
Year-end chart performance for "Margaritaville"
Chart (1977)	Rank
Canada RPM Top Singles	56
US Billboard Hot 100	14
US Cash Box	24

== Other versions ==
=== Single edit ===
When "Margaritaville" was released to radio stations in 1977, the single edit ran for 3:20, cutting out the instrumental break, and the section during the third chorus and final refrain. Thus, the song structure changed to "riff-verse-chorus-verse-chorus-verse-chorus-riff", and the track itself was sped up at half-step. The original recording in the key of D would be E-flat.

=== Cover versions ===
"Margaritaville"

Song by Alan Jackson with Jimmy Buffett

from the album Under the Influence
- Released: October 26, 1999
- Genre: Country
- Length: 4:15
- Label: Arista Nashville
- Songwriter: Jimmy Buffett
- Producer: Keith Stegall

In 1999, American country singer Alan Jackson covered the song on his album Under the Influence. The cover featured Buffett singing along on the third and final verse; it also peaked at No. 63 after receiving play as an album cut.

American singer Toby Keith covered it as a duet with Sammy Hagar in 2013 for his album Drinks After Work. It appeared only on the deluxe edition of the LP. This version was also included on the Sammy Hagar & Friends album, also from 2013.

Jimmy Buffett also re-recorded this song as well as "Cheeseburger in Paradise" and "Volcano" specifically for Rock Band as downloadable content.

=== Parodies ===
In 1991, comedian Mark Eddie wrote a parody of the song titled "Marijuanaville". The song appeared on the album Rock n' Roll Comedy Cuts Part II (1998).

In 2006, Kenan Thompson did a parody of the song during the Weekend Update segment on Saturday Night Live, where he plays a soldier who found out he was going to the U.S.-Mexico border, rather than Baghdad. When Amy Poehler asks him what his reaction was when he discovered he was going to the border, he is shown in the next shot with a Corona banner above him and a sombrero on his head, swaying a Corona beer bottle and singing, "Wasting away again not in Iraq."

In 2013, a parody aired on the John Boy & Billy Big Show titled "Martinsville", referencing Martinsville Speedway.

== See also ==
- List of number-one adult contemporary singles of 1977 (U.S.)
