= Grapefruit—Juicy Fruit =

Single by Jimmy Buffett

from the album A White Sport Coat and a Pink Crustacean
- A-side: "Grapefruit—Juicy Fruit"
- B-side: "I Have Found Me a Home"
- Released: 1973
- Recorded: 1973
- Studio: Glaser Sound (Nashville, Tennessee)
- Length: 2:57
- Label: Dunhill; D-4385 (US, 7")
- Songwriter: Jimmy Buffett
- Producer: Don Gant

Jimmy Buffett singles chronology
"They Don't Dance Like Carmen No More" (1973)	"Grapefruit—Juicy Fruit" (1973)	"He Went to Paris" (1973)

"Grapefruit—Juicy Fruit" is a song written and performed by American singer-songwriter Jimmy Buffett. It was first released on his 1973 album A White Sport Coat and a Pink Crustacean and was his third single from that album. The single reached No. 23 on the Billboard Easy Listening chart in September 1973.

The song appears on Songs You Know By Heart, a greatest hits compilation that includes Buffett's concert favorites ranging from 1973 to 1979. It was often played live, but was not considered a concert staple.

== History ==
Buffett wrote the song in Key West, Florida at a time when he would play in a bar called Howie's Lounge in the afternoon and work on a fishing boat at night. He would meet young tourist girls riding the Conch Tour Train and take them to the Islander drive-in theater. They would have some purple passion mixed up in a jug, and if mixed correctly the dates would claim they couldn't taste any alcohol, to which Buffett would reply, "That's the point."

On the live album You Had to Be There, Buffett mentions that one of the movies he took a date to see was Payday.

In "The Parrot Head Handbook," which accompanies the box set Boats, Beaches, Bars & Ballads, Buffett says of the origin of the song: "The place was the Islander Drive-In theatre, and the movie was Payday starring Rip Torn. The girl was from St. Petersburg, Florida, and she was running away from a bad boyfriend. The popcorn was salty, and the beer was cold."

== Charts ==
Chart (1973)	Peak position
U.S. Billboard Easy Listening	23
Canadian RPM Adult Contemporary	47
