= Why Don't We Get Drunk =

Single by Jimmy Buffett

from the album A White Sport Coat and a Pink Crustacean
- A-side: "The Great Filling Station Holdup"
- Released: April 1973
- Studio: Glaser Sound (Nashville, Tennessee)
- Genre: Country
- Length: 2:43
- Label: Dunhill
- Songwriter: Marvin Gardens (pseudonym of Jimmy Buffett)
- Producer: Don Gant

Audio sample
- file; help

"Why Don't We Get Drunk" is a novelty song written and performed by American singer-songwriter Jimmy Buffett. It was a B-side to "The Great Filling Station Holdup", the first single from his 1973 album A White Sport Coat and a Pink Crustacean. A fan favorite, the song was almost always performed at Buffett's live concerts until the 2007 Bama Breeze tour, after which it was only performed occasionally.

Buffett wrote the song under the pseudonym Marvin Gardens, derived from a property on the original Atlantic City version of the Monopoly game board.

== Description ==
The song is a parody of standard country music love songs. Buffett states that he made the song "as a total satire [and] wasn't even going to put it on the album. We did it foolin' around in one take. But immediately that song became controversial, and there were jukebox sales." Buffett further notes, "I was hearing a lot of very suggestive country songs—in particular, Norma Jean's "Let's Go All the Way". I figured I would write a song that would leave no doubt in anybody's mind. I thought back to a late night in an Atlanta diner where I was eating and watching this out-of-focus businessman trying to pick up a hooker. That's all the inspiration I needed."

== Single release ==
Soon after the release of the single "The Great Filling Station Holdup"/"Why Don't We Get Drunk", it had sold over 50,000 copies just to jukebox operators, according to B.J. McElvee, country promotion manager for ABC-Dunhill Records. Billboard magazine reported that only the A-side, "The Great Filling Station Holdup," was promoted to country radio, because the explicit content in the latter song was not generally acceptable in country radio programming at the time; however, "Why Don't We Get Drunk" was played by some underground stations on FM radio. "Why Don't We Get Drunk" was identified by Billboard as a "jukebox favorite" more than three years after its original release.

== History ==
In the 1970s and 1980s, Buffett frequently sang the song in concert with one of the choruses replaced with "why don't we get stoned and screw." This can be heard on the 1978 live album release You Had to Be There, where Buffett declares, "I just found a little good Colombian herb and we'll smoke it all, me and you."

In the 1990s, though, Buffett modified the lyrics to include references to using condoms and getting a designated driver if necessary. He was quoted as saying, "It's my way of saying this is the '90s and that I don't want any of the fans to get drunk and drive, and to remind them about using a condom. By sticking the message in the song, it's a way to get the point across subtly, using some humor."
