= Changes in Latitudes, Changes in Attitudes (song) =

Single by Jimmy Buffett

from the album Changes in Latitudes, Changes in Attitudes
- B-side: "Landfall"
- Released: August 1977
- Recorded: November 1976
- Genre: Folk rock; Gulf and Western
- Length: 3:15
- Label: ABC Dunhill
- Songwriter: Jimmy Buffett
- Producer: Norbert Putnam

Jimmy Buffett singles chronology
"Margaritaville" (1977)	"Changes in Latitudes, Changes in Attitudes" (1977)	"Cheeseburger in Paradise" (1978)

Audio sample
- file; help

"Changes in Latitudes, Changes in Attitudes" is a song written and recorded by American popular music singer-songwriter Jimmy Buffett. It was released as a single (b/w "Landfall") on ABC Dunhill 12305 in August 1977.

== Background ==
It was first released on his 1977 album Changes in Latitudes, Changes in Attitudes. It reached number 37 on the Billboard Hot 100, number 24 on the Hot Country Songs chart, and number 11 on the Easy Listening chart.

This song begins with an instrumental introduction which initially resembles the chorus of "Yellow Bird" (originally a 19th-century Haitian song, which gained popularity in the U.S. through a Hawaiian-flavored instrumental by the Arthur Lyman group in 1961), and then it evolves into the distinctive chorus of this song itself. Billboard described the song as using "sailing and sun -drenched island imagery" and "catchy, Caribbean instrumentation" while having a "more serious tone" than Buffett's previous single "Margaritaville."

The phrase "and son of a bitches" was edited out of the single version of the song, replaced by "some bruises, some stitches". American Top 40 did play the original unedited version only once when it debuted at No. 38 on 10/22/77.

Cash Box compared it with "Margaritaville" saying that "the instrumental embellishments here are carried by harmonica rather than flute, while the lyrics are philosophical without quite so heavy an emphasis on alcohol." Record World said that "it's lighthearted and ironic and makes a fine commentary on Buffett's new-found pop stardom."

"Changes in Latitudes, Changes in Attitudes" was one of Buffett's more popular songs with fans, and was part of "The Big 8" that he played at almost all of his concerts. Recorded live versions of the song appear on You Had to Be There, and the video Live by the Bay.

== Chart performance ==
Chart (1977)	Peak position
U.S. Billboard Hot 100	37
U.S. Billboard Hot Adult Contemporary Tracks	11
U.S. Billboard Hot Country Singles	24
Canadian RPM Top Singles	34
Canadian RPM Adult Contemporary Tracks	6
Canadian RPM Country Tracks	21
