= Tompall & the Glaser Brothers =

American country music group

Tompall & The Glaser Brothers
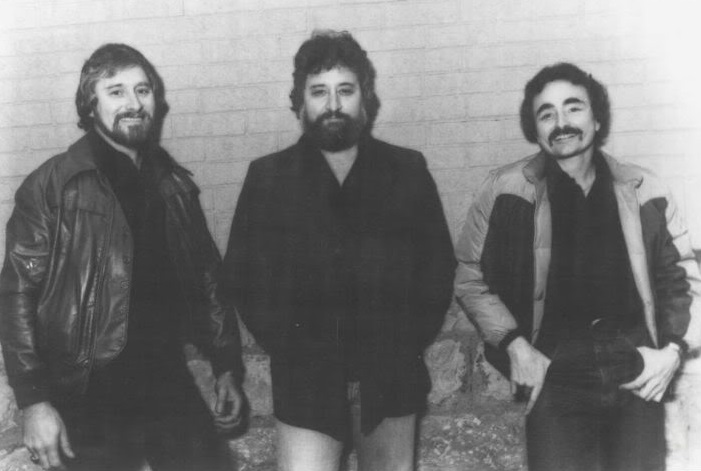
- Tompall & the Glaser Brothers in 1980: L-R: Chuck, Tompall, Jim

Background information
- Origin: Spalding, Nebraska, United States
- Genres: Country
- Years active: 1950s–1973, 1979–1982
- Labels: Decca, Vocalion, MGM/Curb, Elektra
- Past members: Chuck Glaser; Jim Glaser; Tompall Glaser

Tompall & the Glaser Brothers were an American country music group composed of three brothers: Chuck (February 27, 1936 – June 10, 2019), Jim (December 16, 1937 – April 6, 2019), and Tompall (September 3, 1933 – August 13, 2013) Glaser. The Glaser brothers started singing together at country fairs and contests in and around the Spalding, Nebraska, area when they were preteens. In 1957, the group got their big break when they appeared on Arthur Godfrey's Talent Show and attracted the attention of several well-known country stars, including Marty Robbins.

== Biography ==
Between 1960 and 1975, the trio recorded 10 studio albums and charted nine singles on the Billboard Hot Country Singles charts. (Their material for Bravo Records was released under the name the Charleston Trio.) The Glasers became members of the Grand Ole Opry in the 1960s. The group took a hiatus from 1973 to 1978, when each brother pursued individual interests. They reunited in 1979 and released several singles and two albums, including, Loving Her Was Easier, which reached number two on the Billboard charts.

In 1962, the Glaser brothers started a publishing company and began to take on songwriters whom other name-brand studios had chosen to ignore. One of those songwriters was John Hartford, who wrote "Gentle on My Mind", a song that has been recorded by over 300 artists, including Glen Campbell, Elvis Presley, and Johnny Cash. The popularity of the song is enormous; it has been performed live over 6 million times.

In 1970, the brothers opened their own studio at 916 19th Ave. South in Nashville. The new studio, Glaser Sound, was often referred to as Hillbilly Central because it was a haven for artists who wanted to have more artistic control over their own music and careers. The studio included a publishing company, production company, talent agency, and design services for album covers. In that venue, creative experimentation thrived as new opportunities for songwriters and artists became commonplace.

On the day that the publishing company was sold in 1975, Chuck was rushed to the hospital with a stroke. Following his recovery, which also included relearning how to sing, Chuck began to explore other lucrative business ventures, including producing a syndicated television show and a children’s album, among others . Tompall and Jim continued with their musical careers, both achieving success as solo artists.

In 1990, the brothers were asked to reunite for one final Grand Ole Opry show in a tribute to Hank Snow. Out of respect for Snow, they accepted the offer.

In 2013, a documentary titled From Nebraska Ranchers to Nashville Rebels: The Story of the Glaser Brothers was released. Produced by Newshound Productions, the film provided new information about the brothers as individuals and as a group. The sources for the documentary came from family, friends, and music industry insiders. The documentary features comments by Jim Glaser, Chuck Glaser, Cowboy Jack Clement, Bobby Bare, Kinky Friedman, Ronny Robbins, Robert K. Oermann, Marshall Chapman, Gordon Stoker, Willis Hoover, Bill Holmes, Doyle Grisham and others.

Tompall died on August 13, 2013, at the age of 79, leaving behind his widow, June Johnson Glaser. His funeral service was conducted at the Cathedral of the Incarnation in Nashville, Tennessee, on August 16, 2013. The private family service was conducted by Father Edward Steiner, senior pastor at the cathedral. Jim died on April 6, 2019, aged 81. Chuck died on June 10, 2019, aged 83.

== Discography ==
=== Albums ===
Year	Album	US Country
1960	This Land - Folk Songs	—
1967	Country Folks	—
1967	Tompall & the Glaser Brothers	41
1968	Through the Eyes of Love	18
1968	The Wonderful World of the Glaser Brothers	—
1969	Now Country	—
1970	Soundtrack From "...tick...tick...tick..."	42
1971	The Award Winners	—
1972	Rings and Things	33
1972	Sing Great Hits from 2 Decades	—
1973	Charlie	—
1974	Greatest Hits	—
1975	Vocal Group of the Decade	—
1981	Lovin' Her Was Easier	36
1982	After All These Years	54
2002	The Best of Tompall Glaser & the Glaser Brothers	—

=== Singles ===
Year	Single	Chart Positions		Album
Year	Single	US Country	CAN Country	Album
1959	"She Loves the Love I Give Her"	—	—	This Land - Folk Songs
1966	"Gone, On the Other Hand"	24	—	Tompall & the Glaser Brothers
1967	"Through the Eyes of Love"	27	—	Through the Eyes of Love
1968	"The Moods of Mary"	42	—	Through the Eyes of Love
1968	"One of These Days"	36	—	The Wonderful World of the Glaser Brothers
1969	"California Girl (And the Tennessee Square)"^{A}	11	—	Now Country
1969	"Wicked California"	24	—	Now Country
1969	"Walk Unashamed"	30	—	Now Country
1970	"All That Keeps Ya Goin'"	33	—	Now Country
1970	"Gone Girl"	23	—	single only
1971	"Faded Love" (with Leon McAuliffe and the Cimarron Boys)	22	—	The Award Winners
1971	"Rings"	7	21	Rings and Things
1972	"Sweet, Love Me Good Woman"	23	41	Rings and Things
1972	"Ain't It All Worth Living For" (with The Nashville Studio Band)	15	—	singles only
1973	"A Girl Like You"	46	—	singles only
1973	"Charlie"	47	85	Charlie
1980	"Weight of My Chains"	43	—	single only
1980	"Sweet City Woman"	34	39	single only
1981	"Lovin' Her Was Easier (Than Anything I'll Ever Do Again)"	2	2	Lovin' Her Was Easier
1981	"Just One Time"	17	—	Lovin' Her Was Easier
1982	"It'll Be Her"	19	—	Lovin' Her Was Easier
1982	"I Still Love You (After All These Years)"	28	—	After All These Years
1982	"Maria Consuela"	88	—	After All These Years

- ^{A}Peaked at No. 92 on Billboard Hot 100.
