= Fruitcakes (album) =

Album by Jimmy Buffett

Studio album by Jimmy Buffett
- Released: May 24, 1994
- Genre: Country rock; Gulf and Western
- Length: 61:51
- Label: Margaritaville Records/MCA/ MCAD-11043 (US, CD)
- Producer: Russell Kunkel; Jimmy Buffett

Jimmy Buffett chronology
Off to See the Lizard (1989)	Fruitcakes (1994)	Barometer Soup (1995)

Fruitcakes is the eighteenth studio album by American singer-songwriter Jimmy Buffett. Initially to be called Quietly Making Noise, the album was released in May 1994. It was Buffett's first studio recording since Off to See the Lizard (1989), with its five-year gap being the longest between two albums in his career. Buffett had used the hiatus to focus on writing books such as Tales from Margaritaville (1989) and Where Is Joe Merchant? (1992).

== Chart performance ==
Fruitcakes reached #5 on the Billboard 200 album chart, making it Buffett's first top five album. The album was also certified "Platinum" by the RIAA on December 19, 2004.

The first single from the album, "Fruitcakes," charted at No. 29 on the Billboard Adult Contemporary chart. The second single, "Frenchman for the Night," did not chart.

== Songs ==
Several of the songs on this album are covers of other recording artists. The first of these is Grateful Dead's "Uncle John's Band". "Sunny Afternoon" is a song by The Kinks. "She's Got You" is a famous Country/Pop song written by Hank Cochran and first recorded and released as a single by Patsy Cline.

== Track listing ==
No.	Title	Writer(s)	Length
1.	"Everybody's Got a Cousin in Miami"	Jimmy Buffett; Michael Tschudin	7:19
2.	"Fruitcakes"	Buffett; Amy Lee	7:40
3.	"Lone Palm"	Buffett	4:28
4.	"Six String Music"	Buffett; G.E. Smith	3:25
5.	"Uncle John's Band"	Jerry Garcia; Robert Hunter	4:30
6.	"Love in the Library"	Buffett; Mac McAnally	4:40
7.	"Quietly Making Noise"	Buffett; Tschudin	5:51
8.	"Frenchman for the Night"	Buffett; Roger Guth	4:30
9.	"Sunny Afternoon"	Ray Davies	4:12
10.	"Vampires, Mummies and the Holy Ghost"	Buffett; Guth, Peter Mayer; Jim Mayer	4:53
11.	"She's Got You"	Hank Cochran	2:46
12.	"Delaney Talks to Statues"	Buffett; McAnally; Lee	3:41
13.	"Apocalypso"	Matt Betton	3:56

== Personnel ==
The Coral Reefer Band:

- Jimmy Buffett – guitar, vocals
- Michael Utley – keyboards
- Greg "Fingers" Taylor – harmonica
- Robert Greenidge – steel drums, percussion
- Roger Guth – drums
- Peter Mayer – guitars, vocals
- Jim Mayer – bass, vocals
- Amy Lee – saxophone
- Johnny Padilla – saxophone
- John Lovell – trumpet
- Angel Quinones – congas, percussion
- Michael Tschudin – keyboards, mallet kat
- Nicky Yarling – violin, vocals
- Mac McAnally – guitar, vocals
- G.E. Smith – guitar
- Claudia Cummings, Mary Harris, Nicolette Larson – background singers
