= Changes in Latitudes, Changes in Attitudes =

Studio album by Jimmy Buffett
- Released: January 20, 1977
- Recorded: November 1976
- Studio: Criteria (Miami); Quadrafonic Sound (Nashville)
- Genre: Country rock; folk; Gulf and Western
- Length: 41:28
- Label: ABC; AB-990 (US, 12"), MCA (Reissues)
- Producer: Norbert Putnam

Jimmy Buffett chronology
Havaña Daydreamin' (1976)	Changes in Latitudes, Changes in Attitudes (1977)	Son of a Son of a Sailor (1978)

Singles from Changes in Latitudes, Changes in Attitudes
- 1. "Margaritaville" b/w "Miss You So Badly" Released: February 14, 1977; 2. "Changes in Latitudes, Changes in Attitudes" b/w "Landfall" Released: August 1977

Changes in Latitudes, Changes in Attitudes is the seventh studio album by American popular music singer-songwriter Jimmy Buffett. This is his breakthrough album, which remains the best-selling studio album of Buffett's career, and contains his biggest single, "Margaritaville". It was initially released in January 1977 as ABC AB-990 and rereleased on its successor label, MCA.

Changes was very popular and critically well-received and was a transitional album on several levels for Buffett. In a commercial sense, it ushered in Buffett's greatest period of chart and airplay popularity – changing him from an FM cult favorite and minor hitmaker to a top-draw touring artist whose albums sold in the millions, receiving regular AM airplay at the time. Changes would be followed by equally popular and more grandiose expressions of Buffett's "Caribbean Soul" on Son of a Son of a Sailor (1978) and Volcano (1979). All of these albums would combine pop, bar-band rock, country, folk, and reggae influences with the professional production of Norbert Putnam.

== Chart performance ==
Changes in Latitudes, Changes in Attitudes reached No. 12 on the Billboard 200 album chart and No. 2 on the Billboard Top Country Albums chart. The album was also certified "Platinum" by the RIAA.

Two singles from the album charted including "Margaritaville" (#8 on the Billboard Hot 100; No. 13 on the Billboard Hot Country Singles chart; No. 1 on the Billboard Easy Listening chart) and "Changes in Latitudes, Changes in Attitudes" (#37 Hot 100; No. 24 Country; No. 11 Easy Listening).

== Songs ==
The songs on the album were written or co-written by Buffett except for three covers: Steve Goodman's "Banana Republics", Jonathan Baham's “Lovely Cruise” and Jesse Winchester's "Biloxi."

Two of the songs on the album had also previously been recorded by Buffett. The original version of "Wonder Why We Ever Go Home" appeared on the Rancho Deluxe soundtrack under the title "Wonder Why You Ever Go Home" and a different version of "In The Shelter" was originally released in 1971 on High Cumberland Jubilee. "In the Shelter" was re-recorded for the album Changes In Latitudes, Changes In Attitudes in 1977. But then re-recorded yet again for the compilation album in 2002's Meet Me in Margaritaville: The Ultimate Collection making it (with "The Captain and the Kid") one of only two Buffett songs with three different studio versions.

Aside from "Biloxi", all songs appear at least once on a live album, making Changes in Latitudes, Changes in Attitudes the LP with the most live appearances.

The title track begins with an instrumental introduction which initially resembles "Yellow Bird" (originally a 19th-century Haitian song, which gained popularity in the U.S. through a Hawaiian-flavored instrumental by the Arthur Lyman group in 1961), and then it gradually evolves into the distinctive chorus of the song itself. In the song, the line "good times and riches and son-of-a-bitches, I've seen more than I can recall" was replaced with "good times and riches, some bruises and stitches, I've seen more than I can recall" for the radio edit single release of the title-track, with rather crude (and obvious) editing, although American Top 40 did play the original unedited version only once when it debuted at No. 38 on October 22, 1977.

Some later MCA repressings of the LP feature a roughly 30-second acoustic reprise of "Changes in Latitudes, Changes in Attitudes" at the end of the album following "Landfall".

== Critical reception ==
Professional ratings
Review scores
Source	Rating
AllMusic	4/5 stars
Christgau's Record Guide	B+
Rolling Stone	3/5 stars

The Richmond Times-Dispatch wrote that "Buffett combines the voice and instrumentation of a West Coast country rocker with the attitude of an undergraduate who prematurely retired to Barbados."

== Track listing ==
All tracks written by Jimmy Buffett, except where noted.

Side one
No.	Title	Writer(s)	Length
1.	"Changes in Latitudes, Changes in Attitudes"		3:15
2.	"Wonder Why We Ever Go Home"		3:51
3.	"Banana Republics"	Burgh, Steve Goodman, Rothermel	5:11
4.	"Tampico Trauma"		4:35
5.	"Lovely Cruise"	Jonathan Baham	3:54

Side two
No.	Title	Writer(s)	Length
6.	"Margaritaville"		4:09
7.	"In the Shelter"		4:00
8.	"Miss You So Badly"	Buffett, Greg "Fingers" Taylor	3:41
9.	"Biloxi"	Jesse Winchester	5:38
10.	"Landfall"		3:14

== Personnel ==
Credits from album liner notes.

The Coral Reefer Band:

- Jimmy Buffett – lead and backing vocals, acoustic guitar
- Michael Jeffry – backing vocals, lead guitar
- Roger Bartlett – lead guitar on "In the Shelter"
- Harry Dailey – backing vocals, bass
- Michael Utley – organ, piano
- Michael Gardner – drums (except “Landfall,” “Biloxi,” and “Margaritaville”)
- Kenneth "Barfullo" Buttrey – congas; drums on "Landfall", "Biloxi," and "Margaritaville"
- Greg "Fingers" Taylor – harmonica; “one line” of vocals on "Lovely Cruise"
- Farrell Morris – percussion
- Billy Puett – recorders and flutes on "Margaritaville"
- Shelly Kurland – concertmaster
- David Bryant – backing vocals

Technical

- Norbert Putnam – producer; string arrangements on "Changes in Latitudes, Changes in Attitudes" and "Biloxi"
- Norbert Putnam, Michael Utley – string arrangements on "Tampico Trauma" and "Banana Republics"
- Michael Utley – flutes and recorders arrangements on "Margaritaville", composed poolside in Miami
- Marty Lewis – engineer
- Alex Sadkin – assistant engineer
- Glenn Meadows – mastering
- Mike "Wheezer" Wheeler – road manager

== Singles ==
- "Margaritaville" b/w "Miss You So Badly" (Released on ABC Dunhill 12254 on February 14, 1977)
- "Changes in Latitudes, Changes in Attitudes" b/w "Landfall" (Released on ABC Dunhill 12305 in August 1977)

== Tour ==
1977 saw Buffett catch a big wave as he opened for the Eagles for several dates in March and a few in July. "Margaritaville" flew up the charts in the summer, helping the summer tour grow to the amphitheaters that Buffett played until his passing in 2023. Amazing Rhythm Aces opened for a few shows in California in May, while the Little River Band was picked up in June to open. Jennifer Warnes also opened some shows. In late June, Buffett added new drummer Kenneth Buttrey to the band, and they rehearsed for three nights in Sarasota, FL before embarking on a tour of the south that included a couple of shows opening for the Eagles again in Florida and Texas. The August 2 show in New York was broadcast along the east coast on the radio, Buffett's first broadcast since 1975. A special show was played in September as Buffett opened for Fleetwood Mac at County Stadium in Milwaukee, WI. For the fall, Buffett drafted Jesse Winchester to open shows throughout the south and along the east coast.

=== 1977 Coral Reefer Band ===
- Jimmy Buffett: Vocals and guitar
- Tim Krekel: Guitar and Background Vocals
- Harry Dailey: Bass and Background Vocals
- Jay Spell: Piano
- Greg "Fingers" Taylor: Harmonica and Background Vocals
- Michael Utley: Keyboards
- Kenneth Buttrey: Drums

=== Set list ===
Setlists changed nightly, mainly during an acoustic set that took place between "Makin' Music for Money" and "Margaritaville", but the structure was pretty consistent. The shows typically opened with the title track and ended with "Tampico Trauma". "This Hotel Room" (Steve Goodman cover) and "Dixie Diner" (Larry Raspberry and the Highsteppers cover) were played during the encore, with the band occasionally coming back out on stage after "Dixie Diner" to perform "Lovely Cruise" as a second encore.

An average setlist:

1. "Changes in Latitudes, Changes in Attitudes"
2. "Pencil Thin Mustache"
3. "Wonder Why We Ever Go Home"
4. "Landfall"
5. "Banana Republics" (Steve Goodman cover)
6. "Makin' Music for Money"
7. "God's Own Drunk" (Richard Buckley cover) (acoustic)
8. "Margaritaville"
9. "A Pirate Looks at Forty"
10. "Come Monday"
11. "Why Don't We Get Drunk"
12. "Biloxi" (Jesse Winchester cover)
13. "Tampico Trauma"
  Encore:
14. "This Hotel Room" (Steve Goodman cover)
15. "Dixie Diner" (Larry Raspberry And The Highsteppers cover)
  Encore 2:
16. "Lovely Cruise"
