= Rancho Deluxe (soundtrack) =

Soundtrack album by Jimmy Buffett
- Released: 1975
- Recorded: 1975
- Genre: Country
- Length: 28:27
- Label: United Artists; UA 466G (US, 12")
- Producer: Andrea Troolin, Jeff Rougvie (re-release producers)

Jimmy Buffett chronology
A1A (1974)	Rancho Deluxe (1975)	Havana Daydreamin' (1976)

Alternative cover
- Cover of 1998 Rykodisc re-release

Professional ratings
Review scores
Source	Rating
AllMusic	4/5 stars

Rancho Deluxe is the soundtrack from the film Rancho Deluxe starring Jeff Bridges and Sam Waterston. It is the sixth album by American singer-songwriter Jimmy Buffett. It was initially released in 1975 as United Artists Records UA 466G and later re-released on labels licensed by Metro-Goldwyn-Mayer (who owns the soundtrack's rights) including Capitol and Rykodisc.

== Alternative versions ==
The 1998 Rykodisc re-release of Rancho Deluxe includes four tracks of movie dialogue that were not present on the original soundtrack.

== Songs ==
The soundtrack album contains songs and instrumental incidental music, all written by Buffett. "Wonder Why We Ever Go Home" and "Livingston Saturday Night" were subsequently re-recorded by Buffett and released on Changes in Latitudes, Changes in Attitudes and Son of a Son of a Sailor respectively. Both of the remakes are significantly different than the Rancho Deluxe originals. "Livingston Saturday Night" is a monaural recording and has significant lyrical changes (e.g., "sixteen may get you twenty" becomes "fifteen may get you twenty") and "Wonder Why We Ever Go Home" is extended to become a full-length song.

Unlike the music of his previous three albums, Rancho Deluxe is a heavily country album with none of the "Gulf and Western" feel that has typified most of Buffett's career. It is his only album that contains a song that Buffett himself does not sing on, "Left Me with A Nail to Drive" with vocals by Coral Reefer Band member Roger Bartlett.

There were no singles released from the album.

A one-sided 33 rpm 7" Radio Spots record was released by United Artists UAC 222 to advertise the movie. The advertisement jingle was not by Jimmy Buffett.

== Track listing ==
=== Original release ===
All tracks are written by and composed by Jimmy Buffett.

Side One
No.	Title	Length
1.	"Rancho Deluxe (Main Title)"	2:12
2.	"Ridin' in Style"	1:05
3.	"Left Me with a Nail to Drive"	1:33
4.	"Cattle Truckin'" (instrumental)	1:27
5.	"Countin' the Cows Ev'ry Day"	2:23
6.	"The Wrangler" (instrumental)	2:09
7.	"Rancho Deluxe (End Title)"	2:54

Side Two
No.	Title	Length
8.	"Livingston Saturday Night"	3:28
9.	"Some Gothic Ranch Action" (instrumental)	1:26
10.	"Wonder Why We Ever Go Home"	1:48
11.	"Fifteen Gears" (instrumental)	2:14
12.	"Can't Remember when I Slept Last"	1:38
13.	"Rancho Deluxe" (instrumental)	4:10

=== 1998 re-release ===
All tracks are written by and composed by Jimmy Buffett.

1998 re-release track listing
No.	Title	Length
1.	"Rancho Deluxe (Main Title)"	2:12
2.	"X-Mas Bonus" (movie dialogue track)	0:16
3.	"Ridin' in Style" (instrumental)	1:05
4.	"Left Me with a Nail to Drive"	1:33
5.	"Rustler's That's Us" (movie dialogue track)	0:09
6.	"Cattle Truckin'" (instrumental)	1:27
7.	"Countin' the Cows Ev'ry Day"	2:23
8.	"The Wrangler" (instrumental)	2:09
9.	"Rancho Deluxe (End Title)"	2:54
10.	"Livingston Saturday Night"	3:28
11.	"Dork" (movie dialogue track)	0:23
12.	"Some Gothic Ranch Action" (instrumental)	1:26
13.	"Wonder Why We Ever Go Home"	1:48
14.	"Hood Ornament" (movie dialogue track)	0:11
15.	"Fifteen Gears" (instrumental)	2:14
16.	"Can't Remember when I Slept Last"	1:38
17.	"Rancho Deluxe" (instrumental)	4:10

== Personnel ==
- Jimmy Buffett – Guitar, vocals
- Roger Bartlett – Guitar, vocals on "Left Me with A Nail to Drive"
- Tommy Cogbill – Bass
- Sammy Creason – Drums
- Phillip Fajardo – Drums
- Doyle Grisham – Steel guitar
- Greg "Fingers" Taylor – Harmonica
- Reggie Young – Electric guitar
- Michael Utley – Keyboards
