= God's Own Drunk =

Single by Jimmy Buffett
- A-side: "God's Own Drunk"
- Released: September 16, 2011
- Recorded: July 23, 2011
- Genre: Pop rock; country rock
- Length: 10:10
- Label: Mailboat Records
- Songwriter: Lord Buckley

"God's Own Drunk" is a monologue by Lord Buckley that musicians have since adapted into different types of songs; most notably, Jimmy Buffett, who first recorded his rendition for Living and Dying in ¾ Time and has since released a digital download single of a live performance in 2011. Buffett's version was a concert staple and even regarded as his theme before "Margaritaville"'s popularity, until he was forced to stop playing it after being sued by Buckley's son, Dick Buckley Jr., for copyright infringement.

== Content ==
Buckley's monologue tells a story in the first-person of a teetotaler who finds himself taking care of his brother-in-law's still, eventually giving in to his temptation and drinking its whiskey. In the midst of his bender, he crosses paths with a bear, who, from the narrator's drunken perspective, is a male Kodiak about 16 feet tall. The narrator's fearlessness interests the bear, and out of mutual curiosity, the narrator gives the bear some whiskey and names him "Buddy". The two drink the night away, and the narrator awakens to find that both Buddy and the still are gone, implying that the bear liked the whiskey so much that he stole the still.

== Buffett's cover ==
Although Buffett did not officially record his rendition until 1974, he had been performing it since 1966 after two friends played him Buckley's 1959 Hollywood recording of Lord Buckley in Concert. Buffett and his friends were living in New Orleans at the time and were playing at a bar where the performers were required to do a rendition of Buckley's "God's Own Drunk". Buffett's version has only slight variations as in the bear is about 19 feet (Buffett) not 16 feet (Buckley) tall.

== Lawsuit ==
In the Names and Faces section in newspapers all over the country on August 30, 1983, the following story ran:

Singer Jimmy Buffett, known for hits like "Margaritaville" and "Havana Daydreaming," has been named in an $11-million suit alleging that one of his songs was taken from a dramatic monologue by the late Richard (Lord) Buckley, an entertainer during the 1930s and 1950s. Buckley's son, Dick Buckley Jr., charged in a suit filed last Thursday in US District Court in Los Angeles that Buffett infringed on his father's copyright. Buckley charged that Buffett took parts of his father's monologue from A Tribute to Buckley and claimed it as his work in "God's Own Drunk."

Although Buffett had credited Buckley as the author of "God's Own Drunk", Buckley Jr.'s complaint stated that Buffett did not have authorization to record the song and objected to Buffett's insertion of profanity and "immorality" in the monologue, which created the impression that Lord Buckley had performed the monologue the same way.

=== The Lawyer and the Asshole ===
Though few details of the lawsuit are known, it inspired a song titled "The Lawyer and the Asshole". Because "God's Own Drunk" was a concert staple before the lawsuit, the song's sudden absence from the setlist was a disappointment to fans, so Buffett played "The Lawyer and the Asshole" instead, to explain why he couldn't and wouldn't perform "God's Own Drunk".

== Live performances ==
Buffett had been performing "God's Own Drunk" on an occasional basis since learning it in 1966, but the song became a concert staple after its recording in 1974 and remained a standard until 1978, after which he only performed it on an occasional basis because it did not mesh well with the softer sound he was promoting with Son of a Son of a Sailor. A live version was released on You Had to Be There, capturing the crowd's demand for its performance and its acclaim when Buffett finally played it after teasing some fans before the preceding song "Grapefruit—Juicy Fruit". By 1983, when Dick Buckley Jr. sued Buffett for copyright infringement, the song was dropped completely.

When Buffett was obligated to stop performing it during the lawsuit, he instead occasionally played "The Lawyer and the Asshole" as a substitute, with the earliest known performance being in Telluride, Colorado on August 27, 1983, and the last being November 16, 1986, in Gainesville, Florida. Sometimes, in lieu of playing "God's Own Drunk" due to the litigation, he would heave a boxful of little "Buddy Bears" to the audience or did trivia about the song, where he would ask the questions and the crowd would shout the answer.

The outcome of the court case is unknown, but Buffett had brought "God's Own Drunk" back to the setlist in 1988 and since then has only played it rarely. Aside from the You Had to Be There performance, other notable live versions are: at the Palladium on March 14, 1980 (captured on Ringling Ringling); in George, Washington, on August 22, 1992, with several references to the Gorge Amphitheatre; at Toyota Park in Bridgeview, Illinois on July 23, 2011, using the Chicago Bears as a plot device for the Kodiak bear in the song, going on to release this performance as a single; and its most recent performance at the Riverbend Music Theater on June 21, 2016.

On September 6, 2008, Buffett moved his 8:00 pm show in Mansfield, Massachusetts, at the Comcast Center to 3:00 pm because Hurricane Hanna was expected to make landfall in Massachusetts later that night. After singing "Why Don't We Get Drunk", Buffett surprised the Coral Reefer Band by waving them off stage to perform solo, in which he played a 10-minute rendition of "God's Own Drunk" while the rest of the band stood to the side of the stage and watched. This was done to extend the show as long as possible before the hurricane arrived, resulting in a three-hour performance of 29 songs.

== Pop-culture references ==
In Buffett's studio take, one of the types of drunks listed off is "Reggie Younging", a reference to guitarist Reggie Young.

In the song "Semi-True Story" from Beach House on the Moon, Buffett sings about the day in 1974 when he recorded "God's Own Drunk".

Mike Harding does a faithful rendition of Lord Buckley's monologue, using it as the title track of his 1989 album.
