= Barometer Soup =

Studio album by Jimmy Buffett
- Released: August 1, 1995
- Recorded: January–February 1995
- Studio: Shrimpboat Sound (Key West)
- Genre: Country rock; Gulf and Western
- Length: 54:23
- Label: Margaritaville Records/MCA/ MCAD-11247 (US, CD)
- Producer: Russell Kunkel; Jimmy Buffett

Jimmy Buffett chronology
Fruitcakes (1994)	Barometer Soup (1995)	Banana Wind (1996)

Professional ratings
Review scores
Source	Rating
Allmusic	2/5 stars

Barometer Soup is the nineteenth studio album by American popular music singer-songwriter Jimmy Buffett. The album was released on MCA and Margaritaville Records on August 1, 1995.

== History and reception ==
Following the release of Fruitcakes in the previous year, Buffett returned to songwriting and recorded the collection in Key West, Florida in January and February 1995. The album continued Buffett's album chart success begun with Fruitcakes and reached No. 6 on the Billboard 200. The album was also certified "Platinum" by the RIAA on December 19, 2004.

The first single from the album, "Mexico" reached No. 25 on the Billboard Adult Contemporary chart but "Bank of Bad Habits", the second single, did not chart.

As usual, Buffett went on tour in the summer of 1995, although instead of basing it on the album, he called it the "Domino College Tour", after a song released on the box set three years prior; the song was co-written by Buffett and Dan Fogelberg. Songs from Barometer Soup still appeared regularly in the tour, including "Don't Chu-Know", "Diamond as Big as the Ritz" and "Mexico." Played less frequently on the tour were "Jimmy Dreams", the title track, "Bank of Bad Habits" and "The Night I Painted the Sky."

== Songs ==
"Remittance Man" borrows from Mark Twain's description of meeting two remittance men during his voyage in "Following the Equator". "Diamond as Big as the Ritz" is based on the short story of the same name by F. Scott Fitzgerald. Buffett regarded the song as his favorite on the album. "The Ballad of Skip Wiley" is based primarily on Carl Hiaasen's book Tourist Season (although it also references the character of Skink Tyree, who appeared not in Tourist Season, but recurs in other Hiaasen novels). The final song on this album is a cover of James Taylor's song "Mexico". Buffett noted his appreciation for some cover songs, and regarding "Mexico", he said "I always loved that song... and it's a nice way to pay homage to your friends. I think the audience really likes it, too."

== Track listing ==
All tracks are written by Jimmy Buffett, Russ Kunkel, Jay Oliver, Roger Guth and Peter Mayer, except where noted.

Track list
No.	Title	Writer(s)	Length
1.	"Barometer Soup"		4:58
2.	"Barefoot Children"		4:54
3.	"Bank of Bad Habits"		3:53
4.	"Remittance Man"		5:59
5.	"Diamond as Big as the Ritz"		5:20
6.	"Blue Heaven Rendezvous"		4:01
7.	"Jimmy Dreams"	Jimmy Buffett	3:39
8.	"Lage Nom Ai"		3:42
9.	"Don't Chu-Know"		3:48
10.	"Ballad of Skip Wiley"		4:33
11.	"The Night I Painted the Sky"		5:30
12.	"Mexico"	James Taylor	4:06

== Personnel ==
The Coral Reefer Band:

- Jimmy Buffett: Guitar and vocals
- Michael Utley: Keyboards
- Greg "Fingers" Taylor: Harmonica
- Robert Greenidge: Steel drums, percussion
- Roger Guth: Drums
- Peter Mayer: Guitars, vocals
- Jim Mayer: Bass, vocals
- Jay Oliver: Keyboards, programming
- Amy Lee: Saxophone
- Johnny Padilla: Saxophone
- John Lovell: Trumpet
- Thom Mitchell: Horns
- Michael Tschudin: Keyboards, Mallet Kat
- Ralph MacDonald: Percussion
- Background Singers: Claudia Cummings, Mary Harris, Nicolette Larson

== Charts ==
=== Weekly charts ===
Chart (1995)	Peak position
US Billboard 200	6

=== Year-end charts ===
Chart (1995)	Position
US Billboard 200	138

== Certifications ==
Region	Certification	Certified units/sales
United States (RIAA)	Gold	500,000^{^}
^{^} Shipments figures based on certification alone.
