= A1A (disambiguation) =

A1A may refer to:

- Florida State Road A1A
- A1A (album), a 1974 album by Jimmy Buffett
- Alpha-1 antitrypsin, a protease inhibitor secreted by the liver
- Several branches of A1 motorway in Switzerland numbered as A1a, located separately in Geneva, Lausanne and Vaud
- Continuous wave modulation with Morse code

== See also ==
- A1A-A1A, an AAR wheel arrangement in locomotives
