= You Had to Be There =

Live album by Jimmy Buffett
- Released: October 1978
- Recorded: Fox Theatre in Atlanta, Georgia, (8, 9, August 10, 1978), Maurice Gusman Cultural Center in Miami, Florida (14,15,16 August 1978)
- Genre: Country rock; Gulf and Western
- Length: 103:07
- Label: ABC
- Producer: Norbert Putnam

Professional ratings
Review scores
Source	Rating
AllMusic	3.5/5 stars
Music Week	2/4 stars

You Had to Be There is a live double album by the American popular music singer-songwriter Jimmy Buffett. It was originally released in October 1978 as ABC AK-1008/2 and later re-released on ABC's successor label MCA. It is the first of Buffett's many live albums and his tenth album overall. The original vinyl print album included a fold-out poster showing many photos taken during the 1978 Cheeseburger in Paradise Tour.

The album's material was taken from several concerts in August 1978 at Fox Theatre in Atlanta, Georgia, and Maurice Gusman Cultural Center in Miami, Florida, and was mixed by Elliot Scheiner at AIR Studios in London. "Come Monday" is the only song on the album that features a vocal overdub recorded in a studio.

Buffett has mentioned in past interviews that the album was recorded during a very "painful" time. This was because he had broken his leg at one point during the tour, and was performing in a cast (as referenced several times on the record and even pictured in the inner jacket). He would usually be immobile and would take painkillers to continue on during the frenzied performances.

== Chart performance ==
You Had to Be There reached No. 72 on the Billboard 200 album chart and No. 29 on the Billboard Top Country Albums chart. The album was also certified "Gold" by the RIAA.

== Songs ==
The album included many of Buffett's concert favorites as well as three new songs that had not appeared on any previous Buffett album: "Perrier Blues", "Morris' Nightmare", and the instrumental "Dixie Diner" (a cover originally by Larry Raspberry & the Highsteppers).

The album was heavily edited between shows and the track listing is not in the same order as the actual shows. Songs known to have been played but deleted from the final cut are:

- "Banana Republics"
- "Cheeseburger in Paradise"
- "Coast of Marseilles"
- "The Last Line"
- "Livingston Saturday Night"
- "Mañana"

The omission of "Cheeseburger in Paradise" is noteworthy because the song was at its peak in popularity at the time, and was even used to name the tour. The reason the song was scrapped from the album is unknown, although one theory is that since it was a current charting single, producer Norbert Putnam didn't want two competing versions of the same song in circulation at the same time.

== Track listings ==
=== Original phonograph record release ===
Side One
No.	Title	Writer(s)	Length
1.	"Son of a Son of a Sailor"	Jimmy Buffett	4:00
2.	Untitled (Dialogue)		:30
3.	"Pencil Thin Mustache"	Jimmy Buffett	3:19
4.	Untitled (Dialogue)		1:03
5.	"Wonder Why We Ever Go Home"	Jimmy Buffett	4:13
6.	"Landfall"	Jimmy Buffett	3:08
7.	Untitled (Dialogue)		:45
8.	"Miss You So Badly"	Jimmy Buffett, Greg Taylor	3:57

Side Two
No.	Title	Writer(s)	Length
1.	Untitled (Dialogue)		1:00
2.	"Havaña Daydreamin'"	Jimmy Buffett	4:26
3.	Untitled (Dialogue)		1:28
4.	"Margaritaville" (premiere of "The Lost Verse")	Jimmy Buffett	4:53
5.	Untitled (Dialogue)		:20
6.	"Changes in Latitudes, Changes in Attitudes"	Jimmy Buffett	3:09
7.	Untitled (Dialogue)		:17
8.	"Come Monday"	Jimmy Buffett	3:28
9.	Untitled (Dialogue)		:36
10.	"Perrier Blues"	Jimmy Buffett	3:26

Side Three
No.	Title	Writer(s)	Length
1.	Untitled (Dialogue)		4:50
2.	"Grapefruit-Juicy Fruit"	Jimmy Buffett	3:00
3.	Untitled (Dialogue)		2:04
4.	"God's Own Drunk"	Lord Buckley	10:45
5.	Untitled (Dialogue)		2:09
6.	"He Went To Paris"	Jimmy Buffett	4:13
7.	Untitled (Dialogue)		:30
8.	"The Captain and the Kid"	Jimmy Buffett	3:44

Side Four
No.	Title	Writer(s)	Length
1.	Untitled (Dialogue)		3:19
2.	"Why Don't We Get Drunk (and Screw)"	Marvin Gardens	2:38
3.	Untitled (Dialogue)		1:20
4.	"A Pirate Looks at Forty"	Jimmy Buffett	4:31
5.	Untitled (Dialogue)		:24
6.	"Tampico Trauma"	Jimmy Buffett	4:50
7.	Untitled (Dialogue)		1:17
8.	"Morris' Nightmare"	Tim Krekel, Jimmy Buffett	2:58
9.	"Dixie Diner"	L. Raspberry, G. Taylor, C. Ferrante, R. Berretta, B. Marshall	5:30
10.	Untitled (Applause)		:49
11.	Untitled (Applause [in run-out groove] (repeats))		:02

=== Compact disc release ===
Disc One
No.	Title	Writer(s)	Length
1.	"Son of a Son of a Sailor"	Jimmy Buffett	4:21
2.	"Pencil Thin Mustache"	Jimmy Buffett	4:37
3.	"Wonder Why We Ever Go Home"	Jimmy Buffett	4:13
4.	"Landfall"	Jimmy Buffett	3:32
5.	"Miss You So Badly"	Jimmy Buffett, Greg Taylor	4:19
6.	"Havaña Daydreamin'"	Jimmy Buffett	6:34
7.	"Margaritaville"	Jimmy Buffett	5:30
8.	"Changes in Latitudes, Changes in Attitudes"	Jimmy Buffett	3:28
9.	"Come Monday"	Jimmy Buffett	3:41
10.	"Perrier Blues"	Jimmy Buffett	3:52

Disc Two
No.	Title	Writer(s)	Length
1.	"Grapefruit-Juicy Fruit"	Jimmy Buffett	8:06
2.	"God's Own Drunk"	Lord Buckley	12:40
3.	"He Went to Paris"	Jimmy Buffett	6:13
4.	"The Captain and The Kid"	Jimmy Buffett	4:15
5.	"Why Don't We Get Drunk (and Screw)"	Marvin Gardens	6:23
6.	"A Pirate Looks at Forty"	Jimmy Buffett	5:47
7.	"Tampico Trauma"	Jimmy Buffett	5:47
8.	"Morris' Nightmare"	Tim Krekel, Jimmy Buffett	3:27
9.	"Dixie Diner"	L. Raspberry, G. Taylor, C. Ferrante, R. Berretta, B. Marshall	6:22

== Personnel ==
The Coral Reefer Band:

- Jimmy Buffett: vocals, acoustic and electric guitar
- Barry Chance: guitar
- Harry Dailey: bass guitar
- Jay Spell: piano
- Mike Utley: organ
- Kenneth Buttrey: drums and percussion
- Greg "Fingers" Taylor: harmonica
- Deborah McColl: background vocals

== Tour ==
Despite the recording being captured during 1978's Cheeseburger in Paradise Tour, Buffett set out on a You Had to Be There Tour from February through April 1979. The remainder of the year was dedicated to promoting his 1979 album Volcano.

=== 1979 Coral Reefer Band ===
- Jimmy Buffett: vocals and guitar
- Barry Chance: guitar
- Harry Dailey: bass guitar and background vocals
- Deborah McColl: background vocals
- Greg “Fingers” Taylor: harmonica and background vocals
- Michael Utley: keyboards
- Andy McMahon: organ
- Sammy Creason: drums

=== Set list ===
The only set list from the tour that has been confirmed is that of the opening night at Florida Gym in Gainesville, Florida. While the structure of Buffett's set lists generally remains the same in a given tour, the song selection varies from night to night, so it is more than likely that there were many changes to the set list as the tour progressed.

Florida Gym
Saturday, February 17, 1979
Set:

1. "Son of a Son of a Sailor"
2. "Pencil Thin Mustache"
3. "Wonder Why We Ever Go Home"
4. "Landfall"
5. "Miss You So Badly"
6. "Boat Drinks"
7. "Margaritaville"
8. "He Went to Paris" (acoustic)
9. "Dreamsicle" (acoustic)
10. "God's Own Drunk" (Richard Buckley cover) (acoustic)
11. "Why Don't We Get Drunk"
12. "Coast of Marseilles" (Keith Sykes cover)
13. "Cheeseburger in Paradise"
14. "Stranded on a Sandbar"
15. "Shiver Me Timbers" (Tom Waits cover) (with Deborah McColl)
16. "Changes in Latitudes, Changes in Attitudes"
17. "A Pirate Looks at Forty"
18. "Come Monday"
19. "Tampico Trauma"
  Encore:
20. "Let the Good Times Roll" (B.B. King cover)
21. "Dixie Diner" (Larry Raspberry and the Highsteppers cover)
  Encore 2:
22. "Tin Cup Chalice" (acoustic)

Universal Amphitheatre, Los Angeles

June 3rd 1978

Set:

1. "Son Of A Son Of A Sailor"
2. "Pencil Thin Mustache"
3. "Wonder Why We Ever Go Home"
4. "Landfall"
5. "Manana"
6. "Livingston Saturday Night"
7. "Margaritaville"
8. "Grapefruit Juicy Fruit"
9. "Banana Republics"
10. "God's Own Drunk"
11. "Why Don't We Get Drunk And Screw"
12. "Coast Of Marseille"
13. "Cheeseburger in Paradise"
14. "Changer in Latitudes, Changes in Attitudes"
15. "A Pirate Looks At Forty"
16. "Come Monday"
17. "Tampico Trauma"
18. "Morris' Nightmare"
19. "Dixie Diner"
20. "The Last Line"
