= Master Plan (album) =

Studio album by Dave Weckl
- Released: 1990
- Studios: Mad Hatter (Los Angeles, California); Studio 88 (St. Louis, Missouri)
- Genre: Jazz
- Length: 51:29
- Label: GRP
- Producers: Dave Weckl; Jay Oliver

Dave Weckl chronology
Master Plan (1990)	Heads Up (1992)

Master Plan is an album by the American drummer Dave Weckl, released in 1990. It peaked at No. 9 on Billboard's Top Contemporary Jazz Albums chart.

== Production ==
The title track was written by Chick Corea. Tom Kennedy played bass on the album.

== Critical reception ==
Professional ratings
Review scores
Source	Rating
Calgary Herald	C
Chicago Tribune	2.5/4 stars

The Chicago Tribune wrote that, "from Corea to straight jazz to funk, Master Plan shows every aspect of Weckl's ability." The Calgary Herald noted that, "while [the album] impresses as a primer for drumming enthusiasts, it suffers from a lack of imagination in the writing." The Orange County Register opined that "Eric Marienthal contributes some excellent solos on alto and soprano saxophone."

== Track listing ==
1. "Tower of Inspiration" (Dave Weckl, Jay Oliver) - 3:59
2. "Here and There" (Weckl, Oliver) - 6:08
3. "Festival de Ritmo" (Weckl, Oliver) - 4:52
4. "In Common" (Roger Guth, Jim Mayer, Peter Mayer) - 5:55
5. "Garden Wall" (Guth, J. Mayer, P. Mayer) - 4:32
6. "Auratune" (Oliver) - 4:47
7. "Softly, as in a Morning Sunrise" - 5:01
8. "Master Plan" (Chick Corea) - 8:14
9. "Island Magic" (Weckl, Oliver) - 4:55

== Personnel ==
- Dave Weckl – drums, timbales (2, 9), brush overdub (4), percussion programming (5, 9)
- Jay Oliver – keyboards (1–6, 9), organ solo (1), additional synth horns (1, 3), guitar programming (1), sound effects (1), programming (5, 9), synth solo (6), rhythm section programming (6), synthesizers (8), synthesizer melodies (9)
- Chick Corea – synthesizer melody (5), synth solo (5, 9), acoustic piano (8)
- Ray Kennedy – acoustic piano (7)
- Peter Mayer – guitars (2, 4), vocals (6)
- Tom Kennedy – bass (1, 7)
- Anthony Jackson – bass (2–5, 8, 9)
- Steve Gadd – drums (8)
- Eric Marienthal – alto saxophone (2, 3), soprano saxophone (2, 4)
- Michael Brecker – tenor saxophone (5)
- Bill Reichenbach Jr. – trombone (1, 3)
- Jerry Hey – trumpet (1, 3)
- Scott Alspach – trumpet (6)

Production

- Ron Moss – album executive producer, management
- Dave Grusin – executive producer
- Larry Rosen – executive producer
- Dave Weckl – producer, arrangements, mixing
- Jay Oliver – co-producer, arrangements, mixing, recording (1–7, 9)
- Bernie Kirsch – recording (8)
- Darren Mora – assistant engineer
- Dee La Croix – studio manager at Mad Hatter Studios
- Joseph Doughney – post production
- Michael Landy – post production
- The Review Room (New York City, New York) – post production location
- Larry McCaull – drum technician
- Chris Sobchack – drum technician assistant
- CMS Digital (Pasadena, California) – digital editing and mastering location
- Evelyn Brechtlein – project coordinator
- Suzanne Sherman – GRP production coordinator
- Andy Baltimore – GRP creative director
- Jim Embach – cover design
- David Gibb – graphic design
- Jacki McCarthy – graphic design
- Andy Ruggirello – graphic design
- Dan Serrano – graphic design
- Jeff Sedlik – front and back cover photography
- Fredericke – grooming
- Sandra Bojin – wardrobe stylist
