= Jay Oliver =

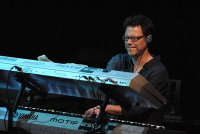
- Oliver in Los Angeles with The Dave Weckl Band, 2004

Background information
- Born: Jay Russell Oliver; April 26, 1959 (age 67); St Louis, Missouri, United States
- Genres: Jazz, jazz fusion, rock, blues, ambient, world music
- Occupations: Composer, songwriter, record producer, musician, engineer, programmer
- Instruments: Piano, synthesizers
- Years active: 1975–present
- Website: Official website

Jay Russell Oliver (born April 26, 1959) is an American jazz musician (piano, keyboards and synths), composer, record producer, programmer and engineer. He began his professional music career at the age of 19 as the youngest member of Maynard Ferguson's band. His later credits include: Sheryl Crow, The Eagles, Jimmy Buffett, Wynonna Judd, Glenn Frey, Peabo Bryson, Chick Corea, Dave Weckl, Russ Kunkel, Jay Graydon, AO Music, Celine Dion and many others.

Oliver resides in Los Angeles, where he has worked extensively in music composition and production, ranging from jazz fusion and world music to soundtracks to session work of all kinds.

At the beginning of 2011, after many years of research and field test studies involving the use of sound from a clinical perspective, Oliver founded a company called SmartWav. The company specializes in the use of proprietary tonal, pitch and rhythm mapping technologies that specifically aid infants in areas of brain development and issues of post-womb insomnia.

== Early career ==
=== Dave Weckl ===
Oliver and Dave Weckl grew up together in St. Louis where they explored a prolific jazz fusion style. A few years later in Los Angeles, after partnering on Weckl's first three solo releases, they formed The Dave Weckl Band, co-producing two albums.

=== Sheryl Crow ===
Oliver was a top local producer in his St. Louis studio when first introduced to a young Sheryl Crow, who at the time was a school teacher and aspiring singer. Oliver eventually began using Crow in recording sessions and featured her in several jingles. She and Oliver moved to Los Angeles within a few years of each other and began co-writing songs that eventually landed Crow a publishing contract and recording deal with A&M Records. Some of those songs were recorded by Celine Dion, Wynonna Judd and others.

=== Glenn Frey ===
In the nineties Oliver was hired as Glenn Frey's keyboardist, co-producer and co-writer. Oliver also has production credit with Elliot Scheiner for the Eagles album Hell Freezes Over as well as their live album New Millennium.

=== Jimmy Buffett ===
In the late 1980s, Oliver was asked by producer Elliot Scheiner to begin co-writing songs with Jimmy Buffett. He co-wrote the Buffett albums Off to See the Lizard and Barometer Soup, then briefly toured as member of his Coral Reefer Band.

== World music ==
In 1996, Oliver began co-producing with Richard Gannaway, the pan-cultural project AO Music, resulting in journeys to Indonesia, Ireland, the People's Republic of Georgia, South Africa, India, Nepal and a special invitation to China, where they were asked by the Beijing Olympic Committee to compose theme music for the 2008 Summer Olympics. AO Music album releases have won prestigious international awards and held strong chart position since 2000 (Zone Music Reporter).

== Credits ==
- Steve Smith, Fiafiaga (Celebration) (Guitar, Keyboards, Mixing, Producer) 1988
- Jimmy Buffett, Off to See the Lizard (Percussion, Keyboards, Composer) 1989
- Original soundtrack, Arachnophobia (Keyboards) 1990
- Chick Corea, "Inside Out" (Synthesizer, Programming) 1990
- Dave Weckl, "Master Plan" (Engineer, Arranger, Programming, Guitar, Producer, Sound Effects, Keyboards, Synthesizer) 1990
- Jimmy Buffett, "Feeding Frenzy" (Keyboards) 1990
- Dave Weckl, "Heads Up" (Programming, Mixing, Associate Producer, Composer, Piano, Keyboards, Synthesizer, Producer, Engineer) 1992
- Glenn Frey, "Strange Weather" (Instrumentation, Programming, Keyboards, Multi Instruments) 1992
- Jay Graydon, "Airplay for the Planet" (Musician, Synthesizer Arrangements) 1993
- Glenn Frey, "Glenn Frey Live" (Keyboards) 1993
- Dave Weckl, "Hardwired" (Composer, Engineer, Associate Producer, Organ, Synth Bass, Keyboards, Programming, Synthesizer, Piano, Mixing) 1994
- Eagles, "Hell Freezes Over" (Horn Arrangements, Keyboards, String Arrangements) 1994
- Peabo Bryson, "Through the Fire" (Synth Percussion, Synth Drums) 1994
- Tiger & the Helix, "Peace Face" (Keyboards, Composer, Mixing Engineer, Producer) 1994
- Glenn Frey, "Solo Collection" (Synth Bass, Synth Drums, Keyboards, Multi Instruments, Arranger) 1995
- Jimmy Buffett, "Barometer Soup" (Composer, Arranger, Horn Arrangements, Programming, Keyboards) 1995
- Phyllis Hyman, "I Refuse to be Lonely" (Engineer, Keyboards) 1995
- Peter Mayer, "Green Eyed Radio" (Strings, Mixing, Publishing, Keyboards, Percussion, Piano, Arrangement Preparations) 1996
- Dave Weckl, "Rhythm of the Soul" (Engineer, Producer, Keyboards, Mixing, Composer) 1998
- Dave Weckl, "Synergy" (Composer) 1999
- Eagles, "Selected Works: 1972-1999" (Keyboards, Engineer, Producer) 2000
- Aomusic - "Grow Wild" (Synthesizer, Sampling, Composer, Producer, Mixing, Keyboards) 2000
- Glenn Frey, "20th Century Masters - The Millennium" (Keyboards, Programming, Arranger) 2000
- Glenn Frey, "Classic Glenn Frey" (Composer) 2001
- Dave Weckl, "Zone" (Associate Producer, Keyboards) 2001
- Eagles, "The Very Best Of" (String Arrangements, Horn Arrangements, Keyboards) 2003
- Jimmy Buffett, "Meet Me in Margaritaville: The Ultimate Collection" (Composer) 2003
- Chick Corea, "Rediscovery On Grp: Chick Corea Family" (Synthesizer Horn, Guitar Programming, Synthesizer Programming, Programming, Keyboards, Composer, Synthesizer, Organ, Soloist, Sound Effects) 2004
- Eagles, "Farewell Tour: Live from Melbourne" (Composers) 2005
- Wynonna Judd, "Wynonna Collector's Edition Tin" (Composer) 2008
- Russ Kunkel, "Zone" (Mixing, Engineer, Keyboards, Producer, Audio Production, Programmings) 2008
- Aomusic - "Twirl" (Synthesizer, Sampling, Composer, Producer, Mixing, Keyboards) 2009
- Aomusic - "...and Love Rages on!" (Synthesizer, Sampling, Composer, Producer, Mixing, Keyboards) 2011
- Aomusic - "Hokulea" (2013)
- Aomusic - "Asha" (2017)
- Aomusic - "Kutumba" (2021)

== Band/ensemble albums ==
- Dave Weckl - Master Plan 1990
- Dave Weckl - Heads Up 1992
- Dave Weckl - Hardwired 1994
- Dave Weckl - Rhythm of the Soul 1998
- Dave Weckl - Synergy 1999
- Aomusic - Grow Wild 2000
- Aomusic - Twirl 2009
- Aomusic - ...and Love Rages on! 2011
- Aomusic - Hokulea 2013
- Aomusic - Asha 2017
- Aomusic - Kutumba 2021
