= Off to See the Lizard =

Studio album by Jimmy Buffett
- Released: June 19, 1989
- Recorded: 1988–1989
- Studios: Hit Factory (New York); Shrimpboat Sound (Key West)
- Genres: Country rock; Gulf and Western
- Length: 47:06
- Labels: MCA; MCA-42093 (US, CD)
- Producer: Elliot Scheiner

Jimmy Buffett chronology
Hot Water (1988)	Off to See the Lizard (1989)	Fruitcakes (1994)

Professional ratings
Review scores
Source	Rating
Allmusic	2.5/5 stars

Off to See the Lizard is the seventeenth studio album by the American music singer-songwriter Jimmy Buffett. Initially to be called Stranger than Fishing, it was released in June 1989 as MCA 6314 and was produced by Elliot Scheiner and Buffett. The album is the first to feature much of the current Coral Reefer Band. Following the release of this album, Buffett paused his normal output of one album every year or two and did not release another album until 1994's Fruitcakes.

== Songs ==
All but one of the album's songs were written or co-written by Buffett. "Mermaid in the Night" was written by Coral Reefer Band members Roger Guth and Jay Oliver. "Boomerang Love" also appeared on the soundtrack to the 1989 movie Always. Buffett recorded a live version of "The Pascagoula Run" for his 2003 greatest hits collection Meet Me in Margaritaville: The Ultimate Collection. Most of the songs are related to Jimmy's first book of stories, Tales from Margaritaville, released the same year. A music video for "Take Another Road" was filmed at the abandoned Islander Drive-In Theater on Stock Island, just outside of Key West, Florida.

== Chart performance ==
Off to See the Lizard reached No. 57 on the Billboard 200 album chart. The song "Take Another Road" hit No. 18 Adult Contemporary.

== Track listing ==
Side One
No.	Title	Writer(s)	Length
1.	"Carnival World"	Jimmy Buffett; Roger Guth; Jay Oliver	3:56
2.	"Take Another Road"	Buffett; Guth; Oliver	3:40
3.	"That's My Story and I'm Stickin' to It"	Buffett; Oliver	4:23
4.	"Why the Things We Do"	Buffett; Guth; Oliver	3:57
5.	"Gravity Storm"	Buffett; Oliver	2:49
6.	"Off to See the Lizard"	Buffett; Oliver	4:12

Side Two
No.	Title	Writer(s)	Length
7.	"Boomerang Love"	Buffett	5:18
8.	"Strange Bird"	Buffett; Oliver	4:19
9.	"I Wish Lunch Could Last Forever"	Buffett; Oliver	5:18
10.	"The Pascagoula Run"	Buffett; Oliver	3:18
11.	"Mermaid in the Night"	Guth; Oliver	2:27
12.	"Changing Channels"	Buffett; Mac McAnally	3:29

== Personnel ==
The Coral Reefer Band:

- Jimmy Buffett – vocals, rhythm guitar
- Jay Oliver – keyboards, percussion
- Peter Mayer – backing vocals, guitars
- Jim Mayer – bass
- Roger Guth – drums
- Robert Greenidge – steel drums
- Michael Utley – organ
- Greg "Fingers" Taylor – harmonica
- Ralph MacDonald – percussion
- "The Nuff Brothers" – Alan Rubin, Birch Johnson, Lou Marini – horns
- Diana Canova, Sheryl Crow, Frank Floyd, Timothy B. Schmit – backing vocals

== Singles ==
- "Take Another Road" b/w "Off To See The Lizard" (7" single released on MCA 53675 in May 1989)
- "Carnival World" b/w ? (cassette single released on MCA ?)

== Tour ==
1989 brought yet another summer tour, with all the usual stops, but this time Jimmy had brought back the Neville Brothers for an opening act. In April, Jimmy played Jazz Fest for the first time, while December brought the mini "Buffett Does Ballads" Tour with Mac McAnally and Larry Knight in support of the new book Tales from Margaritaville.

== Tour dates ==
North America
Date	City	Venue
April 30, 1989	New Orleans	Fair Grounds Race Course
June 14, 1989	San Diego	SDSU Open Air Theatre, San Diego State University
June 15, 1989	San Diego	SDSU Open Air Theatre, San Diego State University
June 17, 1989	Greenwood Village	Fiddler's Green Amphitheatre
June 18, 1989	Greenwood Village	Fiddler's Green Amphitheatre
June 20, 1989	Universal City	Universal Amphitheatre
June 21, 1989	Universal City	Universal Amphitheatre
June 23, 1989	Costa Mesa	Pacific Amphitheatre
June 24, 1989	Costa Mesa	Pacific Amphitheatre
June 25, 1989	Mountain View	Shoreline Amphitheatre
June 28, 1989	Concord	Concord Pavilion
June 30, 1989	Auburn Hills	The Palace of Auburn Hills
July 1, 1989	Hoffman Estates	Poplar Creek Music Theater
July 2, 1989	Milwaukee	Marcus Amphitheater
July 3, 1989	Cuyahoga Falls	Blossom Music Center
July 6, 1989	Columbia	Merriweather Post Pavilion
July 7, 1989	Columbia	Merriweather Post Pavilion
July 8, 1989	Mansfield	Great Woods Amphitheater
July 9, 1989	Mansfield	Great Woods Amphitheater
July 11, 1989	Holmdel	Garden State Arts Center
July 12, 1989	Holmdel	Garden State Arts Center
July 14, 1989	Wantagh	Jones Beach Theater
July 15, 1989	Bristol	Lake Compounce
July 16, 1989	Philadelphia	Mann Music Center
July 21, 1989	Antioch	Starwood Amphitheatre
July 22, 1989	Memphis	Mud Island River Park
July 23, 1989	Dallas	Coca-Cola Starplex
July 25, 1989	Houston	Southern Star Amphitheater
July 27, 1989	Pelham	Oak Mountain Amphitheatre
July 28, 1989	Atlanta	Lakewood Amphitheatre
July 29, 1989	Charlotte	Memorial Stadium
July 30, 1989	Willamsburg	Cary Field
August 1, 1989	Cincinnati	Riverbend Music Center
August 2, 1989	Cincinnati	Riverbend Music Center
August 4, 1989	Tampa	USF Sun Dome
August 5, 1989	Miami	Miami Arena
August 6, 1989	Orlando	Orlando Arena
December 5, 1989	Milwaukee	Riverside Theater
December 6, 1989	Milwaukee	Riverside Theater
December 7, 1989	Pittsburgh	Syria Mosque Theater
December 8, 1989	Columbus	Palace Theatre
December 10, 1989	New York City	Beacon Theatre

=== 1989 Coral Reefer Band ===
- Jimmy Buffett: Vocals and guitar
- Peter Mayer: Guitar
- Jim Mayer: Bass
- Roger Guth: Drums
- Michael Utley: Piano
- Greg “Fingers” Taylor – Harmonica, Background Vocals
- Robert Greenidge: Steel Drums
- Jay Oliver: Keyboards
- Dena Iverson: Vocals

=== Set list ===
Every night "Carnival World" was the opener and "Volcano" was the set closer. "Gravity Storm" and "A Pirate Looks at Forty" were played during the encore, with the latter closing the show. More often than not, "Changing Channels" would be added to the set after "Pirate" and would end the show. The Randy Newman cover "Louisiana 1927" was added to the set after "Pirate" for the Austin, TX show, its only appearance of the tour.

Average set list:

1. "Carnival World"
2. "Jolly Mon Sing"
3. "Grapefruit—Juicy Fruit
4. "Boat Drinks"
5. "Cheeseburger in Paradise"
6. "Off to See the Lizard"
7. "That's My Story and I'm Stickin' to It"
8. "Come Monday"
9. "Son of a Son of a Sailor"
10. "Changes in Latitudes, Changes in Attitudes"
11. "Why Don't We Get Drunk"
12. "Twelve Volt Man"
13. "He Went to Paris"
14. "Take Another Road"
15. "Boomerang Love"
16. "Margaritaville"
17. "Pencil Thin Mustache"
18. "Fins"
19. "Some White People Can Dance"
20. "Volcano"
  Encore:
21. "Gravity Storm"
22. "A Pirate Looks at Forty"
23. "Changing Channels" (played about 4/7 of the time)
