= Encore =

Additional performance added to the end of a concert

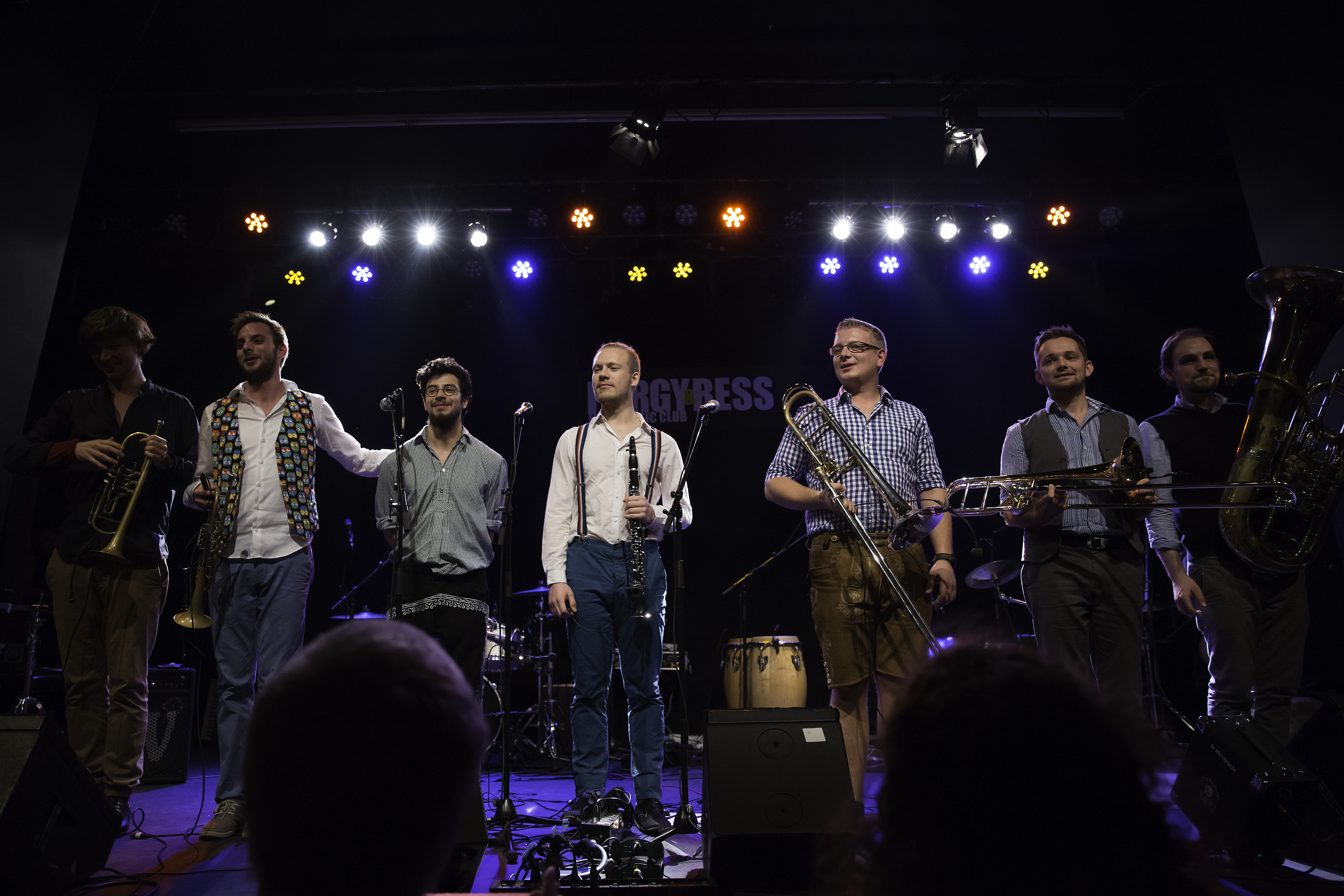
An encore performance at the 2015 Austrian World Music Awards

An encore is an additional performance given by performers at the conclusion of a show or concert, usually in response to extended applause from the audience. Multiple encores are not uncommon, and they initially originated spontaneously, when audiences continued to applaud and demand additional performance from the artists after they had left the stage. However, in modern times they are rarely spontaneous and are usually a pre-planned part of the show.

== Etymology ==
The term originates from the French word encore [ɑ̃kɔʁ], meaning 'again' or 'some more'; however, it is not used this way in French, but it is used as ancora in Italian. French speakers commonly use instead either une autre ('another'), un rappel ('a return, curtain call') or the Latin bis ('second time') in the same circumstances. Italians use bis too. In England, [un']altra volta (Italian for 'another time') was used in the early nineteenth century, but such usage had been completely supplanted by 1900.

== Origin of the encore ==
Encores are believed to have originated from Italian operas in the 18th century. One of the earliest recorded encores was in 1786 at the premiere of Mozart's Marriage of Figaro. Contrary to modern encores, encores were traditionally spontaneous and followed a singular piece or movement. Performers would often perform an encore to multiple pieces within one concert; this could nearly double the length of a concert.

It is commonly believed the encores first began due to a lack of ways to listen to pieces on demand. If people wanted to listen to their favorite pieces, they would have to see them live and many rarely had the opportunity to do this. For this reason, people would demand the chance to hear a piece a second time.

== Instrumental concerts ==
At the end of a concert, if there is prolonged applause, one more relatively short piece may be performed as an encore. In some modern circumstances, encores have come to be expected, and artists often plan their encores. Traditionally, in a concert that has a printed set list for the audience, encores are not listed, even when they are planned. A well-known example is the performance of the Radetzky March and The Blue Danube at the end of the Vienna New Year's Concert by the Vienna Philharmonic Orchestra; neither piece is ever listed in the official program, but they are traditionally played every year.

Sometimes, especially with premiers, certain movements might be applauded enough to provoke an encore of the movement. Sometimes, however, some longer and larger works will not have an encore as it is deemed inappropriate. At the first performance of Haydn's The Creation, Haydn had requested for there to not be any encores of movements out of respect for the entirety of the piece and the continuity of the work. Sometimes though, it is simply due to the conductor or artist being exhausted after a long program.

== Opera performances ==
Beginning in the 18th century, if an aria was strongly applauded, it might be repeated. For example, at the premiere of Mozart's Marriage of Figaro on May 1, 1786, and other early performances, "many pieces were encored, almost doubling the length of each performance".

=== Restrictions on encores ===
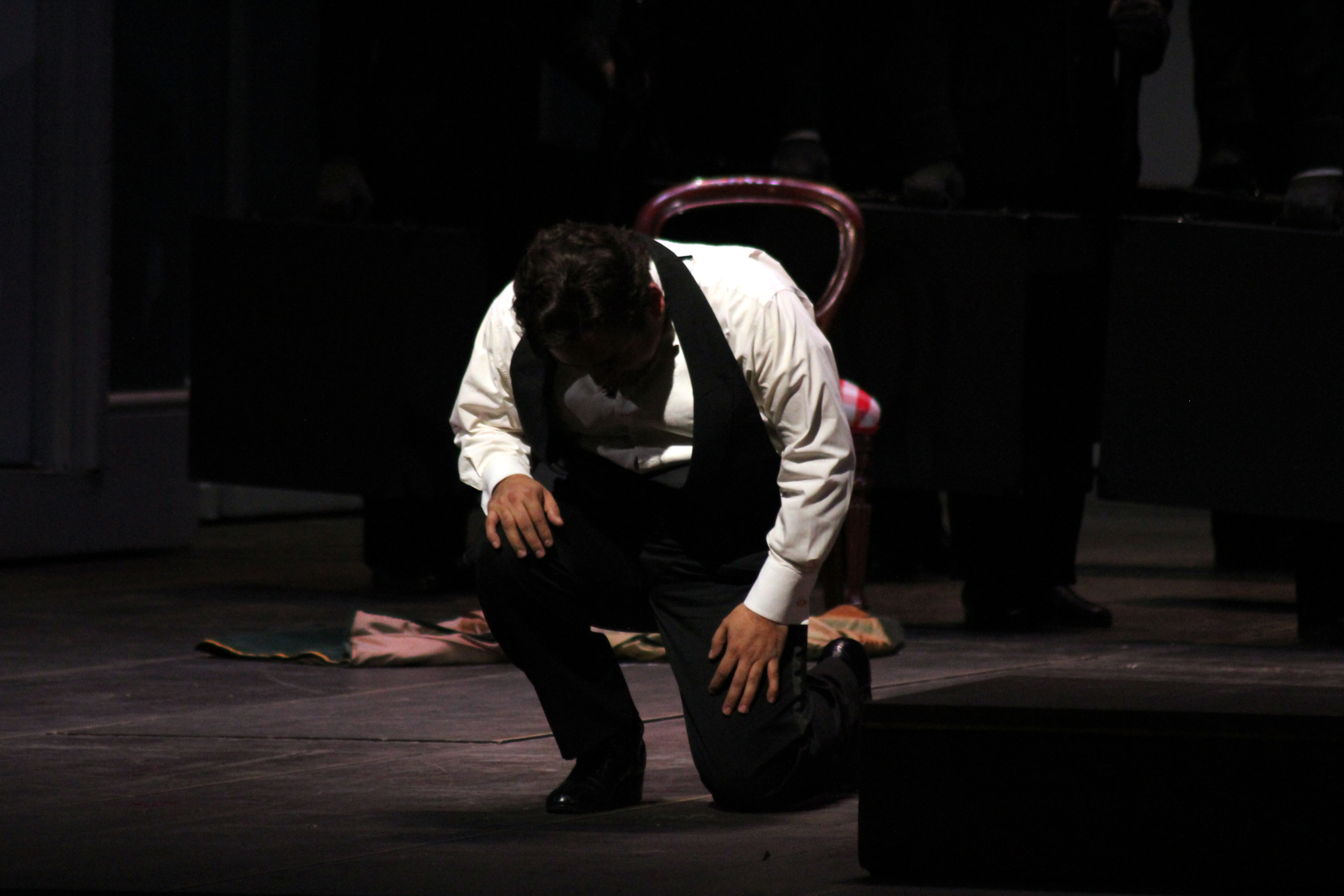
Operatic tenor Javier Camarena finishing a rare encore at the Metropolitan Opera in 2014. Encores are officially banned on the MET stage.

For "Figaro", on 9 May 1786 Emperor Joseph II of Austria issued an order limiting encores. By tradition, some world-class opera houses, such as La Scala and the Metropolitan Opera, officially discourage encores, especially for vocal solos, as encores were associated with less serious performances.

In the mid-19th century, encores were officially banned in northern Italy, since the Austrian-Italian authorities felt that they would lead to public disorder. In 1921, encores were forbidden at La Scala in Milan, Italy because the conductor Toscanini felt they would interrupt the pace of the opera and drew attention to individual singers as opposed to the work. Toscanini had, in 1887, been challenged to a duel after stubbornly refusing an aria's encore. Richard Wagner was similarly against encores.

The ban at the Metropolitan was explicit in the printed programs at the beginning of the 20th century, but was nevertheless often broken at the insistence of the audience. Encores at the Met became rarer later in the century.

== Popular music ==
Encores became popular for pop and rock musicians in the 1960s. In most circumstances, it has become standard for rock, metal, and pop artists to give an encore; especially in large settings such as stadiums and arenas. It is very common for punk bands to perform an encore when in small venues. Artists often plan their encores in advance, and they are commonly included on the artist's setlist; one common practice is to leave one or more of their most popular songs for an encore. However, encores are usually only performed by the headlining artist, as opening bands almost always have restrictions on how long their set can last, and are prohibited from going over the set time with an encore.

Some artists include their encore as the second half of the concert. For example, the Jamaican reggae musician Bob Marley and his band The Wailers were known to play the concerts of their last two tours in 1979 and 1980 in two halves: after the first half was performed they stopped performing for some minutes to tune their instruments again or to have a break, while the audience was demanding for more. They continued to play the concert with the "encore" which lasted about an hour. Sometimes they even played one or two additional songs (a "real" encore in the traditional sense, rather than an inevitable performance staged as an encore) after the planned encore. Similarly, Guided by Voices frontman Robert Pollard generally plays songs from his solo career for the first half of his shows, and then, for the inevitable encore, will play a lengthy selection of Guided by Voices songs, with the two halves generally having roughly equal duration.

In the early days of modern rock music, Elvis Presley never played encores, a practice his manager Col. Tom Parker intended to leave audiences wanting more. The now-famous phrase "Elvis has left the building" was used at the beginning of his career when Presley was not the headliner, followed by a plea for the audience to return to their seats so as to watch those artists following Presley. Once he became a headliner, it was invariably followed by a polite "thank you, and good night", to imply to those present at the concert that there was not going to be an encore.

Jimmy Buffett was known for his intimate second encores at his concerts. He and his band leave the stage after performing their set and return for a typical encore of usually two songs and band introductions. Then they leave the stage again and Buffett comes back out on stage by himself for a second encore and performs an acoustic ballad to end the show. This final song is usually what his hardcore fans look forward to the most because it's a different song every show and usually an obscure selection; many fans consider Buffett's ballads to be his best songs despite not being among his famous songs. A collection of Buffett's second encores, entitled Encores, was released in 2010.

Morphine frontman Mark Sandman sometimes mocked the practice. At the close of Morphine shows, he would wave and say "Thank you! Good night!", but the band would remain in their places, and the lights would not be dimmed. After several minutes, the band would begin playing again.

Boston played multiple shows with four encores throughout the 1980s. Both The Cure and Prince have been known to play a large number of songs in their encores, either in a long singular encore or spanning across multiple encores. The encore portions of their sets have sometimes lasted longer than the initial shows themselves. The Cure has played up to five encores on a handful of occasions and Prince has played up to seven. Most modern encores in pop and rock music are pre-planned and added to the fans' setlist. During The 1975's 2013 tour, they routinely played their popular song "Sex" as an encore song. After their last regular setlist song, fans would chant "We want 'Sex'!" instead of "Encore!"

For modern performers, it is common for them to perform a song they have not previously done on their setlist. Usually, it is one of the more popular songs from the artist. However, some may still perform a song they have already done.

== Encores on Broadway ==
On Broadway, encores are commonly used as a chance to recognize the cast for a longer period of time. Rather than calling the actors back to the stage to demand another performance, the audience will call the actors back to the stage for a final bow to accept more applause.
