= Living and Dying in 3/4 Time =

Living and Dying in ¾ Time

Studio album by Jimmy Buffett
- Released: February 5, 1974 (LP); July 27, 1987 (CD)
- Recorded: October 1973
- Studios: Woodland (Nashville, Tennessee)
- Genres: Country; Gulf and Western
- Length: 38:15
- Label: Dunhill
- Producer: Don Gant

Jimmy Buffett chronology
| A White Sport Coat and a Pink Crustacean (1973) | Living and Dying in ¾ Time (1974) | A1A (1974) |

Singles from Living and Dying in 3/4 Time
- 1. "Saxophones" b/w "Ringling Ringling" Released: January 1974; 2. "Come Monday" b/w "The Wino And I Know" Released: April 1974; 3. "Pencil Thin Mustache" b/w "Brand New Country Star" Released: August 1974

Professional ratings
Review scores
| Source | Rating |
|---|---|
| Allmusic | 3.5/5 stars |
| Christgau's Record Guide | B− |

Living and Dying in ¾ Time is the fourth studio album by American singer-songwriter Jimmy Buffett. It is the second major label album in Buffett's Don Gant-produced "Key West phase". It was initially released in February 1974 as his second album for Dunhill Records. It contains the song "Come Monday", his first top-40 hit single. Dunhill made a concerted effort to promote this album using the money they made from Jim Croce's incredible record sales after his untimely death the previous September.

== Chart performance ==
The album was Buffett's first to chart on the Billboard 200 album chart, but it only reached number 176. Unlike A White Sport Coat and a Pink Crustacean before it, it failed to make the Billboard Top Country Albums chart. The single of "Come Monday" reached number 30 on the Hot 100 and number three Easy Listening and number 58 Country. In addition, "Pencil Thin Mustache" hit number 44 Easy Listening and "Saxophones" "bubbled under" the Hot 100 at number 105.

== Songs ==
In addition to "Come Monday," the album contains "Pencil Thin Mustache", another Buffett concert favorite. The two songs appear on most of his live albums and greatest hits compilations. "Saxophones" was re-recorded in 2003 for the compilation album Meet Me In Margaritaville: The Ultimate Collection, featuring the titular instrument more prominently.

The album contains two cover songs: "Ballad of Spider John" written and originally performed by Willis Alan Ramsey and "God's Own Drunk" by Lord Buckley. Buffett's version of "Ballad of Spider John" is missing some of the lyrics of the original, although he has included these in concert renditions. "Livingston's Gone to Texas" is a remake of Buffett's own song that was originally recorded for High Cumberland Jubilee (recorded 1971, released 1976). The version on Living and Dying in ¾ Time is a slower tempo, more country-sounding presentation, and is missing the penultimate verse of the original.

== Track listing ==
All tracks are written by Jimmy Buffett, except where noted.

Side A
| No. | Title | Writer(s) | Length |
|---|---|---|---|
| 1. | "Pencil Thin Mustache" | | 2:47 |
| 2. | "Come Monday" | | 3:06 |
| 3. | "Ringling, Ringling" | | 2:32 |
| 4. | "Brahma Fear" | | 4:05 |
| 5. | "Brand New Country Star" | V. Arnold, Jimmy Buffett | 2:40 |
| 6. | "Livingston's Gone to Texas" | | 3:28 |

Side B
| No. | Title | Writer(s) | Length |
|---|---|---|---|
| 7. | "The Wino and I Know" | | 3:00 |
| 8. | "West Nashville Grand Ballroom Gown" | | 2:34 |
| 9. | "Saxophones" | | 3:18 |
| 10. | "Ballad of Spider John" | Willis Alan Ramsey | 4:26 |
| 11. | "God's Own Drunk" | Lord Buckley | 6:19 |

== Performers ==
The Second Coral Reefer Band:

- Jimmy Buffett – lead vocals, acoustic guitar
- Reggie Young – electric guitar
- Lanny Fiel – acoustic, electric, and slide guitars
- Doyle Grisham – pedal steel guitar
- Tommy Cogbill – bass
- Mike Utley – keyboards
- Sammy Creason – drums and bodyguard
- Greg "Fingers" Taylor – harmonica
- Ferrell Morris – congas, vibes, and “other little goodies”
- Don Gant, Buzz Cason, Bergen White – background vocals
- Bergen White – string and horn arrangements
- Billy Puett – horns on "Saxophones"

== Singles ==
- "Saxophones" b/w "Ringling Ringling" (released on Dunhill D-4378 in January 1974)
- "Come Monday" b/w "The Wino And I Know" (released on Dunhill D-4385 in April 1974)
- "Pencil Thin Mustache" b/w "Brand New Country Star" (released on Dunhill D-15011 in August 1974)

The single release of "Saxophones" was different from the album version, with an added horn section and background vocal section.
