= Havana Daydreamin' =

- Cover art by David Jarvis

Studio album by Jimmy Buffett
- Released: January 20, 1976 (LP); September 28, 1987 (CD)
- Recorded: 1975–1976
- Studio: Young 'Un Sound (Murfreesboro, Tennessee); Creative Workshop (Nashville, Tennessee)
- Genre: Country rock; Gulf and Western
- Length: 33:08
- Label: ABC (LP); ABCD-914 (US, 12"); MCA (LP reissue, CD); MCA-37023 (LP); MCAD-11093 (CD)
- Producer: Don Gant

Jimmy Buffett chronology
Rancho Deluxe (1975)	Havana Daydreamin' (1976)	Changes in Latitudes, Changes in Attitudes (1977)

Singles from Havana Daydreamin'
- 1. "Havana Daydreamin'" b/w "Big Rig" Released: November 1975; 2. "Captain and the Kid" b/w "Cliches" Released: March 1976; 3. "Woman Goin' Crazy on Caroline Street" b/w "Something So Feminine About a Mandolin" Released: July 1976

Havana Daydreamin' is the sixth studio album by American popular music singer-songwriter Jimmy Buffett and his fourth regular major label album. It was produced by Don Gant and released on January 20, 1976, on LP and January 28, 1987, on CD.

== Alternate versions ==
The album's name was originally to have been Kick It in Second Wind and was to have included the songs "Please Take Your Drunken 15 Year Old Girlfriend Home," "Train to Dixieland," and "Wonder Why You Ever Go Home" as well as a different version of "Kick It in Second Wind." Instead, these songs were replaced with "Woman Goin' Crazy on Caroline Street", "Havana Daydreamin'", and "Cliches." "Wonder Why You Ever Go Home" was rewritten and rerecorded as "Wonder Why We Ever Go Home" for release on Buffett's next album Changes in Latitudes, Changes in Attitudes.

Several rare versions of this album exist or are rumored to. These have altered song ordering and contain two songs that were deleted from the final release: "Please Take Your Drunken 15 Year Old Girlfriend Home" and "Train to Dixieland." A third song that is rumored to exist, "We've Been Taken to the Cleaners (and I Already Had my Shirts Done)," is likely apocryphal, as no known recording of it exists whereas the other two tracks are fairly easy to find in Buffett trading circles.

== Songs ==
Most of the songs on the album were written or co-written by Buffett, two with his future wife, Jane Slagsvol. Other songs include "Big Rig" written by Coral Reefer Greg "Fingers" Taylor and "This Hotel Room" by Steve Goodman (who also co-wrote "Woman Goin' Crazy on Caroline Street" with Buffett). The album also contains a remake of Jesse Winchester's "Defying Gravity," the first of several Winchester songs Buffett would record over his career. None of the songs on the album have been played regularly at Buffett's live concerts since the 1970s.

A different version of "The Captain and the Kid" was originally released in 1970 on Down to Earth, with another on 2003's Meet Me in Margaritaville: The Ultimate Collection, and one more on 2020's Songs You Don't Know by Heart, making it the most re-recorded Buffett song.

For pacing purposes, the second verse of "Woman Going Crazy on Caroline Street" was cut on the single release.

== Chart performance ==
Havana Daydreamin' was Buffett's most successful album to date reaching No. 65 on the Billboard 200 album chart and No. 21 on the Billboard Top Country Albums chart. However, none of the three singles from the album charted.

== Critical reception ==
Professional ratings
Review scores
Source	Rating
Allmusic	3/5 stars
Christgau's Record Guide	B

William Ruhlmann of Allmusic wrote that "By the time of... Havana Daydreamin', Jimmy Buffett seemed to have established a pattern for what a collection of his songs would be". Ruhlman noted that while the album's style was still essentially the country music of Buffett's earlier work, this release exemplified his shift in audience from the country scene to the popular market, as well as his adoption of a "Gulf Coast ne'er-do-well" persona. Peter Reilly of Stereo Review found the album appealing, saying "I confess that I find it hard to resist anyone who spends so little time trying to impress me". Reilly found the title track perhaps the best, calling it "an ambiguous trip into B. Traven (you remember him – The Treasure of Sierra Madre, Death Ship) territory". Record World said that the song "is colored with a lilting south of the border sound that could be a north of the border success". In 2012, Jeff Vrabel of The Florida Times-Union listed the track as one of Buffett's "lost treasures", describing it as "a humid, drifting tale of boats, wine and late-night stories, all wrapped in circumstances that seem darker and more criminal".

== Track listing ==
Side A
No.	Title	Writer(s)	Length
1.	"Woman Goin' Crazy on Caroline Street"	Jimmy Buffett, Steve Goodman	4:08
2.	"My Head Hurts, My Feet Stink, and I Don't Love Jesus"	Jimmy Buffett	2:35
3.	"The Captain and the Kid"	Jimmy Buffett	3:16
4.	"Big Rig"	Greg "Fingers" Taylor	3:30
5.	"Defying Gravity"	Jesse Winchester	2:41

Side B
No.	Title	Writer(s)	Length
6.	"Havana Daydreamin'"	Jimmy Buffett	3:38
7.	"Cliches"	Jimmy Buffett	2:45
8.	"Something So Feminine About a Mandolin"	Jimmy Buffett, Jane Slagsvol	3:32
9.	"Kick It in Second Wind"	Jimmy Buffett, Jane Slagsvol	3:56
10.	"This Hotel Room"	Steve Goodman	3:07

== Personnel ==
The Coral Reefer Band:

- Jimmy Buffett – guitar, vocals
- Roger Bartlett – guitar
- Greg "Fingers" Taylor – harmonica, piano
- Harry Dailey – bass
- Phillip Fajardo – drums

Friends and Honorary Coral Reefers:

- Jerry McGee – guitar
- Steve Goodman – guitar
- Joe Osborn – bass
- Mike Utley – piano
- Sammy Creason – drums
- Farrell Morris – percussion
- Doyle Gresham – pedal steel guitar
- Johnny Gimble – fiddle
- Don Gant – background vocals, producer
- Buzz Cason, Bergen White, Ginger Holiday, Anita Bell – background vocals
- The Oak Ridge Boys – background vocals on "My Head Hurts, My Feet Stink, And I Don’t Love Jesus”
- Horns on "Big Rig" – The Muscle Shoals Horns

== Singles ==
- "Havana Daydreamin'" b/w "Big Rig" (Released on ABC Dunhill 12143 in November 1975)
- "Captain and the Kid" b/w "Cliches" (Released on ABC Dunhill 12175 in March 1976)
- "Woman Goin' Crazy on Caroline Street" b/w "Something So Feminine About a Mandolin" (Released on ABC Dunhill 12220 in July 1976)
