= Penny Nichols =

American folk musician/songwriter (1947–2017)

- Born: December 26, 1947; Los Angeles, California, U.S.
- Died: October 29, 2017 (aged 69)
- Occupations: Folk musician; songwriter
- Years active: 1964–2017
- Spouses: Harry Shearer (m. 1974; div. 1977); Mark Rothe
- Website: pennynichols.com

Penny Nichols (December 26, 1947 – October 29, 2017) was an American folk musician and songwriter.

== Career ==
Nichols began her career in the Southern California folk circuit in Orange County, California, in 1964, singing in a bluegrass band with Alice, Bill & John McEuen. She formed a folk duo called Greasy Mountain Butterballs with Kathy Smith, touring Vietnam in 1966. In 1967, she moved to San Francisco, where she performed as an opening act at venues such as the Avalon Ballroom and Fillmore Auditorium and at outdoor music festivals. Her debut album, Penny's Arcade, was released by Buddha Records in 1967.

In 1968, she toured Europe and recorded at Apple Studios. She returned to Los Angeles to concentrate on songwriting and studied with vocal coach Florence Riggs. She performed with her jazz band, Black Imp.

In the late 1970s, Nichols entered Antioch University to earn degrees in psychology and music. She received a doctorate in education from Harvard University.

Nichols continued performing as a backup singer, joining Jimmy Buffett as a member of his Coral Reefer Band in 1977 and singing on the album Son of a Son of a Sailor. She released the albums All Life Is One in 1990, and Songs of the Jataka Tales in 1993.

Nichols worked as a composer and vocal instructor based in Cambria, California. From there she oversaw Summersongs songwriting camps, held four times a year, twice in New York and twice in California.

== Personal life ==
Nichols married actor Harry Shearer in 1974, they divorced in 1977 after three years of marriage. Nichols subsequently married Mark Rothe.

== Death ==
Nichols died on October 29, 2017, of cancer, at the age of 69.
