= Encores (Jimmy Buffett album) =

Live album by Jimmy Buffett
- Released: April 20, 2010
- Recorded: April 21, 2008 – September 26, 2009
- Genre: Rock; country; Gulf and Western
- Length: 1:31:46
- Label: Mailboat Records
- Producer: Mac McAnally

Jimmy Buffett chronology
Buffet Hotel (2009)	Encores (2010)	Songs from St. Somewhere (2013)

Encores is a live album by American popular music singer-songwriter Jimmy Buffett. The set list includes twenty-two songs compiled from Buffett's intimate second encores, with which he ended his concerts. All songs are taken from the 2008/2009 tours. Unlike other live albums by Buffett, Encores features few standards and Songs You Know by Heart tunes, making the album less mainstream among fans.

The album was recorded during the 2008 "Year of Still Here Tour", with the exception of "He Went To Paris" and "A Pirate Looks at Forty", which were recorded in 2009 in Paris and Waikiki, respectively.

== Track listing ==
Disc 1
No.	Title	Writer(s)	Performance	Length
1.	"Come Monday"	Jimmy Buffett	Jimmy Buffett, Robert Greenidge, Ralph MacDonald, Mac McAnally. Houston, Texas April 21, 2008	3:59
2.	"Tin Cup Chalice"	Jimmy Buffett	Jimmy solo. Manassas, Virginia 9/1/08	3:54
3.	"Growing Older But Not Up"	Jimmy Buffett	Jimmy, Robert, Ralph, Mac. Las Vegas, Nevada October 18, 2008	4:02
4.	"Coast of Carolina"	Jimmy Buffett and Mac McAnally	Jimmy, Peter Mayer, Mac. Raleigh, North Carolina 6/7/08	4:51
5.	"Paradise"	John Prine	Jimmy, Mac. Cincinnati, Ohio July 17, 2008	4:01
6.	"Do You Know What It Means to Miss New Orleans?"	Eddie DeLange and Louis Alter	Jimmy, Allen Toussaint on piano. Jazz Fest, New Orleans, Louisiana 5/3/08	4:27
7.	"Nautical Wheelers"	Jimmy Buffett	Jimmy Solo. Mansfield, Massachusetts 9/4/08	3:48
8.	"Trying To Reason With Hurricane Season"	Jimmy Buffett	Jimmy Solo. Mansfield, Massachusetts 9/6/08	5:07
9.	"Banana Republics"	Steve Goodman	Jimmy, Robert, Ralph, Mac. Chula Vista, CA October 16, 2008	5:28
10.	"He Went To Paris"	Jimmy Buffett	Jimmy Solo. Paris, France September 26, 2009	4:27
11.	"Last Mango in Paris"	Jimmy Buffett, Marshall Chapman, Will Jennings, and Michael Utley	Jimmy Solo. Atlantic City, New Jersey August 24, 2008	4:18

Disc 2
No.	Title	Writer(s)	Performance	Length
1.	"L'air De La Louisiane"	Jesse Winchester	Jimmy Solo. Margaritaville, New Orleans, LA 5/1/08	3:05
2.	"Reggaebilly Hill"	Michael Garrett	Jimmy Solo. Manassas, VA August 30, 2008	3:56
3.	"Coast Of Marseilles"	Keith Sykes	Jimmy, Robert, Ralph, Peter, Tina Gullickson, Nadirah Shakoor, Mac. Mountain View, California October 21, 2008	4:45
4.	"Lovely Cruise"	Jonathan Baham	Jimmy Solo. Las Vegas, NV October 25, 2008	3:22
5.	"Oyster and Pearls"	Jimmy Buffett and Mac McAnally	Jimmy, Mac on Piano. Wantagh, New York August 27, 2008	4:02
6.	"Wildflowers"	Tom Petty	Jimmy, Peter, Mac. Las Vegas, NV October 25, 2008	4:05
7.	"Defying Gravity"	Jesse Winchester	Jimmy Solo. Philadelphia, Pennsylvania June 14, 2008	3:14
8.	"It's A Big Old Goofy World"	John Prine	Jimmy Solo. Chicago, Illinois July 24, 2008	5:01
9.	"Death of an Unpopular Poet"	Jimmy Buffett	Jimmy Solo. Pittsburgh, PA July 22, 2008	3:14
10.	"Blowin' in the Wind"	Bob Dylan	Jimmy Solo. Newport, Rhode Island 8/3/08	4:15
11.	"A Pirate Looks at Forty"	Jimmy Buffett	Jimmy, Jake Shimabukuro. Waikiki, Hawaii February 28, 2009	5:02
