= Eric Darken =

American percussionist

- Genres: Rock, country
- Occupation: Musician
- Instrument: Percussion
- Years active: 1991–present
- Member of: Coral Reefer Band
- Website: ericdarken.com

Eric A. Darken is an American percussionist, composer, and programmer.

== Biography ==
Drawing inspiration from his grandfather, a band leader, Darken began playing drums at age 12, and played timpani and mallets in high school. Darken attended Brevard College in Brevard, North Carolina, then transferred to Oral Roberts University in Tulsa, Oklahoma. Darken was also a part of the ORTV Richard Roberts television show.

Darken has participated in recording sessions for Bon Jovi, Jewel, Luke Bryan, Darius Rucker, Carrie Underwood, and Taylor Swift.

Darken toured in support of Vince Gill, Amy Grant, Faith Hill, Take 6, and Bob Seger. Darken toured with Jimmy Buffett and The Coral Reefer Band up until Buffett’s death in September 2023.

Darken has written music for TV including Dateline NBC, 20/20, Fox Sports, Discovery Channel, NFL Network, National Geographic, and for the film, Fantastic Four: Rise of the Silver Surfer.

Darken created percussion samples and loops for various digital collections.

In 2008, Darken won an Academy of Country Music award for Musician of the Year in the "Specialty Instrument" category.

Darken won the Gospel Music Association Dove Award for Instrumental Album of the Year in 1996.

Darken's first solo album, A Drummer Boy's Christmas, was a jazz Christmas album released in 1993. It was reviewed positively by the Chicago Tribune, whose Nancy Stetson said that it "shows the genre at its best" and "there is nothing cute or gimmicky". Cashbox magazine also reviewed the album with favor, stating that it "is sure to be a favorite in living rooms and store stereos alike with classic-yet-pop-inflected interpretations of your favorites. There's even a few new tunes to make this album worth a second look."
