= Tales from Margaritaville =

Book by Jimmy Buffett

- First edition cover
- Author: Jimmy Buffett
- Genre: Short story collection
- Publisher: Harcourt Brace Jovanovich
- Publication date: September 1, 1989

Tales from Margaritaville is a 1989 short story collection by American singer Jimmy Buffett. The book is broken up into an introduction and three sections, each containing several short stories.

An Introduction: Changes in Latitude contains "Walkabout" and "Where is Margaritaville?", the latter designed to answer a question Buffett says that he is frequently asked.

The Heat Wave Chronicles contains six short stories, all based in the mythical town of Heat Wave, Alabama, on the also mythical island of Snake Bite Key. "Take Another Road", "Off to See the Lizard", "Boomerang Love", "The Swamp Creature Let One In", "The Pascagoula Run", and "I Wish Lunch Could Last Forever" comprise the Heat Wave Chronicles. Five of these short stories are also song titles on Buffett's Off to See the Lizard album.

Margaritian Madness contains "You Can't Take It With You" and "Are You Ready for Freddy?"

Son of a Son of a Sailor contains the stories "Hooked in the Heart", "Life in the Food Chain", "A Gift for the Buccaneer", and "Sometimes I Feel like a Rudderless Child".

== Reception ==
Tales from Margaritaville sold over 120,000 copies and made its way onto the New York Times Best Seller list, where it stayed for seven months. Kirkus Reviews described the collection as "mainly good-natured paeans to sailing, hedonism, and memorable acquaintances."
