= A1A (album) =

Studio album by Jimmy Buffett
- Released: December 26, 1974
- Recorded: August 1974
- Studios: Woodland (Nashville, Tennessee)
- Genres: Country; Gulf and Western
- Length: 39:15
- Label: Dunhill
- Producer: Don Gant

Jimmy Buffett chronology
Living & Dying in 3/4 Time (1974)	A1A (1974)	Rancho Deluxe (1975)

Singles from A1A
- 1. "A Pirate Looks at Forty" b/w "Presents to Send You" Released: February 1975; 2. "Door Number Three" b/w "Dallas" Released: July 1975

A1A or A-1-A is the fifth studio album by American popular music singer-songwriter Jimmy Buffett and the third major label album in Buffett's Don Gant-produced "Key West phase". It was initially released in December 1974 as Dunhill DS-50183 and later re-released on Dunhill's successor labels ABC and MCA.

The album is named for Florida State Road A1A (now named Jimmy Buffett Memorial Highway), that runs mostly along the Atlantic Ocean and is the main road through most oceanfront towns. It is also referenced in the song "Trying To Reason With Hurricane Season". The album's original back cover is a photograph of a section of A1A.

== Chart performance ==
The album reached No. 25 on the Billboard 200 album chart but did not make the country chart. Singles included "A Pirate Looks at Forty" (b/w "Presents to Send You") released in February 1975 and "Door Number Three" (b/w "Dallas") in July 1975 which reached No. 88 on the Billboard Hot Country Singles chart. In Canada the album also reached No. 25.

== Songs ==
Seven of the songs were written by Buffett alone. "Door Number Three", a novelty song about the game show Let's Make a Deal, was co-written by Buffett with Steve Goodman while "Dallas" was written by Coral Reefer Band guitarist Roger Bartlett. There are also two covers of songs from songwriters not associated with Buffett : "Stories We Could Tell" from John Sebastian's 1974 album Tarzana Kid, which was first covered by the Everly Brothers in 1972, and "Making Music for Money" originally written by Alex Harvey for The First Edition's 1974 album I'm Not Making Music For Money.

The album's songs are typical of Buffett's music in the early and mid-1970s. The music is heavily country oriented with Buffett backed by the Third Coral Reefer Band with a number of Nashville session musicians. Likewise, several of the songs (the entire second side of the album) are nautical-themed, a feature of Buffett's music following his move to Key West, Florida.

The lyrics of "Nautical Wheelers" refer to "living & dying in ¾ time", the title of Buffett's previous album; and the song actually is in ¾ time signature. The song was written by Buffett about a square dancing group called Nautical Wheelers, which comes from a boatmaking term for a person who makes hulls of boats.

Record World said that "a new twist to Let's Make a Deal turns ['Door Number Three'] into a portal opener full of fun and profit."

== Critical and commercial reception ==
Professional ratings
Review scores
Source	Rating
AllMusic	3.5/5 stars
Christgau's Record Guide	B−

A1A was not extremely commercially successful at the time of its release. Reviewer Vik Iyengar of AllMusic called A1A "one of Jimmy Buffett's classic '70s albums that established his persona, and it is a perfect introduction to his music." "A Pirate Looks at Forty" from the album appears on all of Buffett's major greatest hits collections and is a perennial concert favorite, one of "The Big 8" that he played at almost every concert.

== Track listing ==
All tracks are written by Jimmy Buffett, except where noted.

Side A
No.	Title	Writer(s)	Length
1.	"Making Music for Money"	Alex Harvey	4:01
2.	"Door Number Three"	Buffett, Steve Goodman	3:03
3.	"Dallas"	Roger Bartlett	3:25
4.	"Presents to Send You"		2:40
5.	"Stories We Could Tell"	John B. Sebastian	3:18
6.	"Life Is Just a Tire Swing"		3:04

Side B
No.	Title	Length
7.	"A Pirate Looks at Forty"	3:57
8.	"Migration"	4:13
9.	"Trying to Reason with Hurricane Season"	4:21
10.	"Nautical Wheelers"	3:35
11.	"Tin Cup Chalice"	3:38

== Personnel ==
The Third Coral Reefer Band

- Jimmy Buffett – vocals, guitar
- Steve Goodman – acoustic lead guitar
- Reggie Young – electric lead guitar
- Doyle Grisham – pedal steel guitar
- Greg "Fingers" Taylor – harmonica
- Tommy Cogbill – bass
- Mike Utley – piano, organ
- Sammy Creason – drums
- Farrell Morris – percussion
- Buzz Cason, Bergen White – background vocals
- Don Gant – background vocals, producer

== Charts ==
Chart performance for A1A
Chart (1975)	Peak position
Australian Albums (Kent Music Report)	43
US Billboard 200	25
