= Lord Buckley =

American comedian and recording artist (1906–1960)

- Born: Richard Myrle Buckley; April 5, 1906; Tuolumne, California
- Died: November 12, 1960 (aged 54); Columbus Hospital, New York City
- Other name: Lord Richard Buckley
- Parent(s): William Buckley and Annie Bone

Comedy career
- Medium: Stage performance, recording and monologue
- Genre: Character comedy

Lord Richard Buckley (born Richard Myrle Buckley; April 5, 1906 – November 12, 1960) was an American stand-up comedian and recording artist, who in the 1940s and 1950s created a character that was, according to The New York Times, "an unlikely persona ... part English royalty, part Dizzy Gillespie."

Michael Packenham, writing in The Baltimore Sun, described him as "a magnificent stand-up comedian... Buckley's work, his very presence, projected the sense that life's most immortal truths lie in the inextricable weaving together of love and irony—affection for all humanity married to laughter."

Buckley's unique stage persona anticipated aspects of the Beat Generation sensibility, and influenced contemporary figures as varied as Dizzy Gillespie, Lenny Bruce, Wavy Gravy, Del Close, and, even after Buckley's death, Ken Kesey, George Harrison, Tom Waits, Frank Zappa, Robin Williams, and Jimmy Buffett. Bob Dylan, in his book Chronicles, said "Buckley was the hipster bebop preacher who defied all labels."

== Early life ==
Buckley's father, William Buckley, was from Manchester, England. He stowed away on a ship that eventually arrived in San Francisco. In California, William met Annie Bone. They married, and their son, Richard, was born in Tuolumne, a small town near Sonora, in a mountainous region where lumbering was a major industry. As children, Buckley and his sister, Nell, would often perform on the streets of Tuolumne, singing for coins from passersby. When he was a bit older, Buckley got a job in the local lumber camps as a "tree topper," which was considered an especially dangerous position. It involved climbing up to the very top of a tall tree, cutting off the tip and then securing ropes that would guide the rest of the tree as it was felled.

After quitting his job in Tuolumne, he travelled to Mexico to work in the oilfields. He moved to Galveston, Texas where he got a job at the Million Dollar Aztec Theatre.

== Career ==
By the mid-1930s, he was performing as emcee in Chicago at Leo Seltzer's dance marathons at the Chicago Coliseum, In the late 1930s he worked for Al Capone, who described Buckley as "the only person who can make me laugh". Capone set up Buckley with his own club, Chez Buckley, on Western Avenue where he performed through the early 1940s. During World War II, Buckley performed extensively for armed services on USO tours, where he formed a lasting friendship with Ed Sullivan.

In the 1950s, Buckley hit his stride with a combination of exaggeratedly aristocratic bearing and carefully enunciated rhythmic hipster slang. He was known for wearing a waxed mustache along with white tie and tails. He sometimes wore a pith helmet. Occasionally performing to music, he punctuated his monologues with scat singing and sound effects. His most significant tracks are retellings of historical or legendary events, like "My Own Railroad" and "The Nazz". The latter, first recorded in 1952, describes Jesus' working profession as "carpenter kitty." Other historical figures include Gandhi ("The Hip Gahn") and the Marquis de Sade ("The Bad-Rapping of the Marquis de Sade, the King of Bad Cats"). He retold several classic documents such as the Gettysburg Address and a version of Edgar Allan Poe's "The Raven." In "Mark Antony's Funeral Oration", he recast Shakespeare's "Friends, Romans, countrymen, lend me your ears" as "Hipsters, flipsters, and finger-poppin' daddies: knock me your lobes." Reportedly, some of his comic material was written for him by Hollywood "beatnik" actor Mel Welles.

Lord Buckley appeared on Groucho Marx's popular TV program You Bet Your Life in 1956. In 1959, he voiced the beatnik character Go Man Van Gogh in "Wildman of Wildsville", an episode of the Bob Clampett animated series Beany and Cecil. (The character reappeared in several episodes made after Buckley's death, when he was voiced by Scatman Crothers.)

Buckley adopted his "hipsemantic" delivery from his peers Cab Calloway, Louis Armstrong, Redd Foxx, Pearl Mae Bailey, Count Basie, and Frank Sinatra, as well as Hipsters and the British aristocracy.

Buckley enjoyed smoking marijuana. He wrote reports of his first experiences with LSD, under the supervision of Dr. Oscar Janiger, and of his trip in a United States Air Force jet.

== Personal life ==
Lord Buckley claimed to have been married six times. He had a son, Fred Buckley. His final marriage was to dancer Elizabeth Hanson (whom he referred to in public as "Lady Buckley"), with whom he had a daughter Laurie (b. 1951) and a son Richard (b. 1952).

== Death ==
In the autumn of 1960, Buckley's manager Harold L. Humes organized a series of club dates in New York City, and arranged for him to make another appearance on The Ed Sullivan Show (that was broadcast from the Ed Sullivan Theater in New York). However, on October 19, 1960, while Buckley was making a public appearance at the Jazz Gallery in St. Mark's Place in Manhattan, the New York Police Department (NYPD) stopped him over allegations he had "falsified information" on his application to get a New York City cabaret card; specifically he had omitted a 1941 arrest for marijuana possession. Cabaret cards had been a legal requirement since Prohibition for anyone, including performers, who wished to work in New York's nightclubs or the entertainment industry. Because working without a license could mean arrest, revoking cards could permanently end careers – a threat that had been used in the past for political purposes or to solicit payoffs from performers.

At a hearing two days later to have his card reinstated, Buckley was supported by more than three dozen major figures in the entertainment and arts world. However, it developed into a confrontation between NYPD Commissioner Stephen P. Kennedy and Buckley's friends and supporters, including Quincy Jones, George Plympton, and Norman Mailer.

Three weeks later, on November 12, 1960, Buckley died from a stroke at New York City's Columbus Hospital. His funeral was at the Frank E. Campbell Funeral Chapel at 81st Street and Madison Avenue in New York City on November 16, 1960. Buckley was cremated at the Ferndale Cemetery in Hartsdale, New York. The scandal of Buckley's death, partially attributed to the seizure of his cabaret card, helped lead to the transfer of authority over cabaret cards from the police to the Licensing Department.

== Legacy ==
Ed Sullivan reflected, "he was impractical as many of his profession are, but the vivid Buckley will long be remembered by all of us."

"The jingle-jangle morning" in "Mr. Tambourine Man" is a phrase Bob Dylan said he took from Lord Buckley. from the line, "Jingle jangle bells all over", in "Scrooge."

Early in his career Dylan performed "Black Cross", one of Lord Buckley's signature pieces, originally written in 1948 by Joseph S. Newman. Dylan's version is one of the tracks on the 1969 bootleg recording Great White Wonder.

Composer David Amram composed a concerto for alto saxophone and orchestra titled Ode to Lord Buckley, and dedicated it to Buckley's memory.

Arlo Guthrie has cited Lord Buckley and Bill Cosby as the primary inspirations behind his song "Alice's Restaurant".

George Harrison's solo song "Crackerbox Palace" was inspired by Buckley's former home in Los Angeles. The song mentions Buckley in the line "know well the Lord is well and inside of you," as well as Buckley's manager George Grief.

Jimmy Buffett performed a version of Buckley's "God's Own Drunk" on his 1974 album Living and Dying in 3/4 Time and it became a signature piece for him until the release of Margaritaville in 1977. On his 1978 live album You Had to Be There, Buffett stated that the song is performed "with much respect to Lord Richard Buckley." Buffett performed his version less frequently after being sued for copyright infringement by Buckley's son in 1983. This lawsuit prompted the writing of "The Lawyer and the Asshole."

George Carlin, during his acceptance speech at the Second Annual Comedy Hall Of Fame Awards, mentioned a long list of his comedy influences, and ended with "the great, great, great Lord Buckley." This can be heard in the televised show.

A feature-length documentary, Too Hip for the Room: The Righteous Reign of Lord Buckley was released in 2016.

=== Memorial ===
On December 5, 1960, largely on the initiative of WEVD's Mort Fega, a jazz memorial tribute to the late Buckley—as well as a benefit fundraiser for his widow and children—was held at the same venue in which he had last performed, the Jazz Gallery in New York. Participants included, among others, Ornette Coleman, Dizzy Gillespie, Dizzy Reece, Thelonious Monk, Ed Blackwell, Nick Stabulas, and Babs Gonzales, as well as comedians Orson Bean and Larry Storch. For the occasion, at least two original compositions were unveiled, with Gonzales debuting "Old McDonald Did the Twist" and Monk performing "The Lord Buckley Blast."

=== Samples in music ===
Buckley's work has been sampled by Jaylib and Madvillain.

- A quote from 'The Gasser', saying "They didn't know where they was going but they knew where they was, wasn't it", was sampled in "Everyday Robots" by British singer and Blur frontman Damon Albarn, the lead single from his debut solo album of the same name.
- Coldcut's "70 Minutes of Madness" mix contains a sample of Buckley's monologue on religion.
- Buckley's "hipsters, flipsters, and finger poppin' daddies" line was sampled by the Waterboys in their song "Where the Action Is."

== Discography ==
Only four albums and three singles were released in his lifetime, but many collections have been released since, including:

Lord Buckley LP cover designed by Jim Flora, 1955

- Hipsters, Flipsters and Finger Poppin' Daddies Knock Me Your Lobes, RCA Victor, catalog #'s LPM-3246 (10" 33 rpm LP) and EPB-3246 (7" 45 rpm two EP record set), 1955
- Euphoria, Vaya Records, catalog # VLP 101/2, 1955 (recorded 1951)
- Euphoria Volume II, Vaya Records, catalog # LVP-107/108, 1956 (recorded 1954)
- Way Out Humor, World Pacific, catalog # WP-1279, 1959
- Buckley's Best, Liberty, catalog # LBS 83191E, 1960
- Parabolic Revelations Of The Late Lord Buckley, Pye Records/Nonesuch, catalog # PPL 208, 1963
- The Best of Lord Buckley, Crestview Records, catalog # CRV-801 (mono), 1963
- Lord Buckley In Concert, World Pacific, catalog # WP-1815, 1964
- Blowing His Mind (and yours too), World Pacific, catalog # WP-1849, 1966
- The Best of Lord Buckley, Elektra Records, catalog # EKS-74047, 1969
- The Bad Rapping of the Marquis De Sade, World Pacific, catalog # WPS-21889, 1969
- a most immaculately hip aristocrat, Straight Records / Reprise, catalog # STS-1054 / RS-6389, 1970
