= Amy Lee (saxophonist) =

American saxophonist, composer and arranger

- Origin: North Adams, Massachusetts
- Genres: Jazz
- Occupations: Musician, arranger, composer
- Instrument: Saxophone
- Label: Publick Ptomaine

Amy Lee is an American saxophonist, composer and arranger. She has played with a variety of musicians and singers, and is best known for being a member of Jimmy Buffett's Coral Reefer Band.

== Early life and education ==
Lee was born in North Adams, Massachusetts and studied music at the University of Miami. After graduating, she moved to Atlanta.

== Career ==
While living in Atlanta, Lee met Charles Neville of the Neville Brothers and began playing for his group Diversity at the New Orleans Jazz and Heritage Festival. Her first album performance was in 1990 on Richard Smallwood's Portrait. After playing with Diversity for six years at the Festival, Lee was introduced to Jimmy Buffett by Neville, and in 1991, she joined Buffett's Coral Reefer Band, where she recorded and toured until 2006. During her career, Lee has recorded for gospel singer Luther Barnes and rap group Y'all So Stupid. She has also acted as a performer, arranger and writer for radio and television commercials.

Lee released her first solo album in 1999, a jazz record titled Inside the Outside. A second album, Use Me, was released in 2004. All of her solo music is released on her independent label Publick Ptomaine Music.

== Discography ==
- 1999: Inside the Outside
- 2004: Use Me
