= Reggie Young =

American musician (1936–2019)

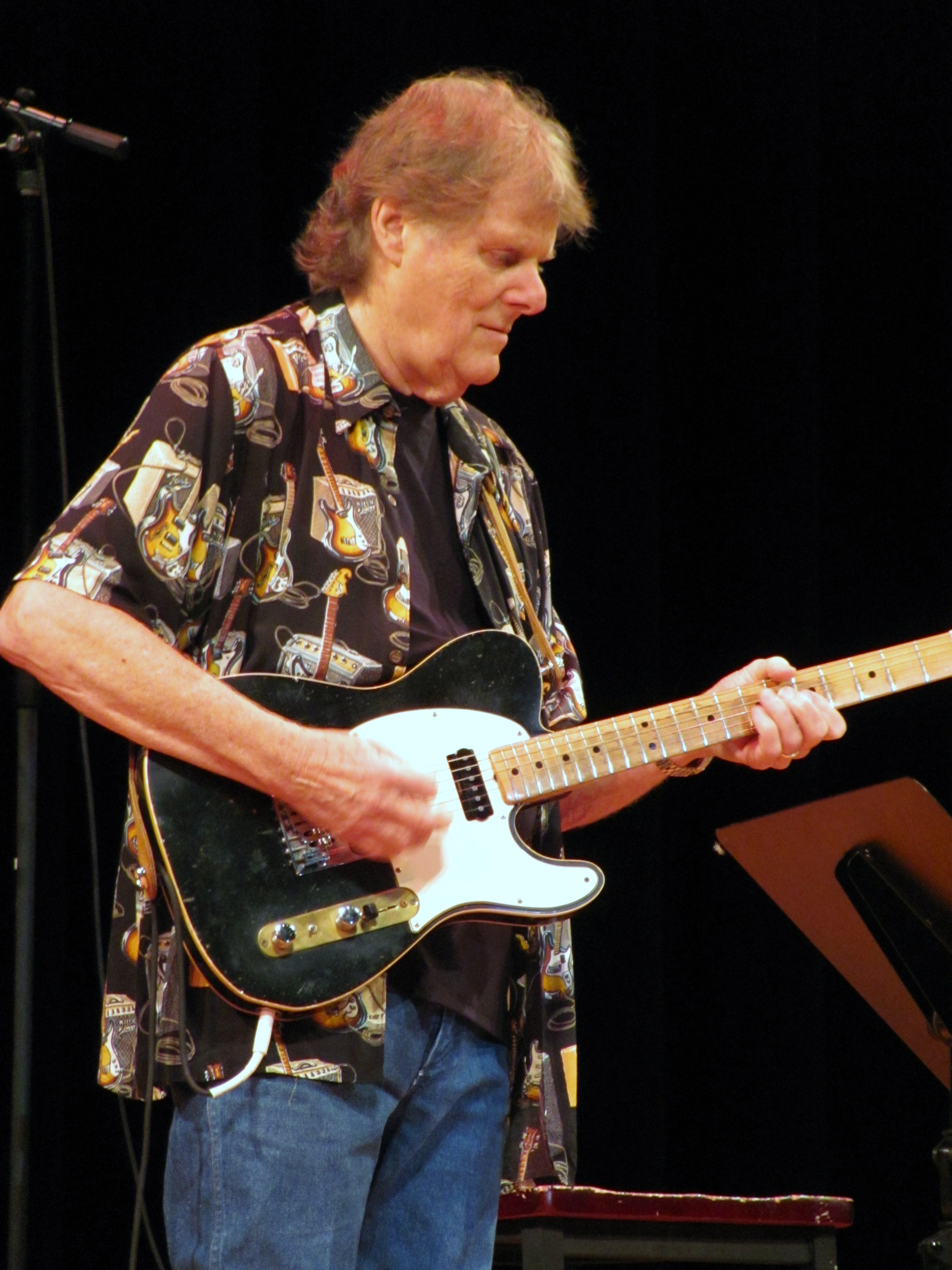
- Guitarist Reggie Young, in concert at the Back in Memphis benefit for Sweet Inspiration Myrna Smith, August 12, 2010, Elvis Week, University of Memphis

Background information
- Born: December 12, 1936; Caruthersville, Missouri, U.S.
- Died: January 17, 2019 (aged 82) Leiper's Fork, Tennessee, U.S.
- Occupation: Guitarist
- Instrument: Guitar
- Years active: 1954–2019
- Formerly of: The Waylors, The Highwaymen, The Memphis Boys, Eddie Bond & the Stompers

Reggie Grimes Young Jr. (December 12, 1936 – January 17, 2019) was an American musician who was lead guitarist in the American Sound Studio house band, The Memphis Boys, and was a leading session musician.

He played on various recordings with artists such as Elvis Presley, Joe Cocker, Dobie Gray, Joe Tex, Merrilee Rush, B.J. Thomas, John Prine, Dusty Springfield, Lynn Anderson, Herbie Mann, J.J. Cale, Jimmy Buffett, Dionne Warwick, Roy Hamilton, Willie Nelson, Waylon Jennings, the Box Tops, Johnny Cash, Jerry Lee Lewis, Merle Haggard, Joey Tempest, George Strait, and The Highwaymen. Young was inducted into the Musicians Hall of Fame and Museum in 2019.

== Early career ==
Born December 12, 1936, in Caruthersville, Missouri, and raised in Osceola, Arkansas, Young's first band was Eddie Bond & the Stompers, a rockabilly band from Memphis, Tennessee, that toured with Johnny Cash, Carl Perkins, and Roy Orbison during the mid-'50s. By 1958, Young was with singer Johnny Horton, making several appearances on the popular Louisiana Hayride radio show in Shreveport. He was an original member of Bill Black's Combo, which had several instrumental hits in the U.S. in 1959 and the early '60s, the most successful being "Smokie, Pts. 1 & 2", "White Silver Sands," and an instrumental version of "Don't Be Cruel," released on Hi Records. Billboard Magazine listed the Combo as the No. 1 instrumental band three years in a row, 1960–1962.

In February 1964, the Beatles requested that the Bill Black Combo open for them during their first U.S. tour. Subsequently, they invited the Combo over to England for another month-long tour. After the death of leader Bill Black (Elvis Presley's original bass player) in October 1965, Young concentrated on being a staff musician at Hi Studio in Memphis until 1967, winding up at American Sound Studio at the request of Chips Moman later that year.

The Memphis Boys were responsible for around 120 hit singles, pop, country, rock, or soul, between 1967 and 1971. Young played on the January/February 1969 Elvis Presley sessions that included "Suspicious Minds", "Kentucky Rain", "Don't Cry Daddy", and "In the Ghetto". When the studio closed in late 1971, Young moved to Nashville as an independent session player. He took part in the July 1973 Presley sessions at Stax Records in Memphis which produced the albums Raised On Rock and Good Times.

In the early 1970s, Young backed Jimmy Buffett as a member of the first three Coral Reefer Bands on "A White Sport Coat & a Pink Crustacean", Living and Dying in 3/4 Time and A1A. On Jimmy's legendary cover of the Lord Buckley classic "God's Own Drunk", Buffett references a "Reggie Youngin commode huggin' drunk". After playing on the sessions for the Highwaymen (Johnny Cash, Waylon Jennings, Willie Nelson, and Kris Kristofferson) in 1984, Young joined their touring show for a five-year stretch (1990–1995). Young also played many sessions and concerts with Waylon Jennings, including his final tours featuring the Waymore Blues Band before Jennings' death in 2002.

Young was nominated for a Grammy, and also performed at the Kennedy Center in honor of Johnny Cash and Willie Nelson. 2008 saw the Country Music Hall of Fame recognizing Young as a "Nashville Cat". That same year also saw the debut of Young's first solo album, the independently released, inspirational Be Still, a collaboration with wife and cellist Jenny Lynn Young.

== Personal life ==
Young met his wife, the classically trained cellist Jenny Lynn Hollowell, in 1999, during the formation of Waylon Jennings' Waymore Blues Band. They married in 2004. They resided in Leipers Fork in middle Tennessee, where Young spent much of his time composing in his home studio.

Young died during the evening of January 17, 2019 at his home in Leiper's Fork, Tennessee from heart failure.

== Selected sessions ==
=== Songs ===
- Bobby Bland - Touch of the Blues
- The Box Tops - "The Letter" (US charts, #1, R&B charts, #30), "Cry Like a Baby" (electric sitar) (US chart #2)
- J.J. Cale - Cajun Moon and Cocaine
- James Carr - I Got My Mind Messed Up (US R&B charts, #7)
- James Carr - More Love
- King Curtis - Memphis Soul Stew (studio album version)
- Neil Diamond - "Sweet Caroline" (US charts #4)
- Dobie Gray - "Drift Away" (US charts #5)
- The Highwaymen - "Highwayman" and "Desperados Waiting for a Train"
- James and Bobby Purify - Morning Glory
- Jumpin' Gene Simmons - Haunted House (US charts #11)
- Herbie Mann - Memphis Underground (#20 US Album charts), Reggae II, Mississippi Gambler
- Delbert McClinton - Victim of Life's Circumstances
- Willie Nelson - "Always on My Mind" (US charts #5, Country charts #1)
- Danny O'Keefe - Good Time Charlie's Got the Blues (US charts, #9, Country charts, #63)
- Sandy Posey - Born a Woman (US charts #12) and Single Girl (US charts #12)
- Elvis Presley - "Suspicious Minds" (US charts #1), "Kentucky Rain" (US charts #16 Country charts #13) "In the Ghetto" (US charts #3 Country charts #60) "Don't Cry Daddy" Country charts #13, (US charts #6)’’ and "I've Got A Thing About You Baby", "Stranger In My Own Hometown"
- Billy Joe Royal - Down in the Boondocks (US charts #9)
- Merrilee Rush - Angel Of The Morning (US charts #7)
- Jackie DeShannon - I Wanna Roo You
- Dusty Springfield - the Dusty in Memphis album, featuring the hit song Son of a Preacher Man (US charts #10)
- Billy Swan - "I Can Help" (US charts #1, Country charts, #1) Lover Please
- Joe Tex - Chicken Crazy (1969)
- Joe Tex - Skinny Legs and All (1967) (US charts #10)
- B.J. Thomas - "Hooked on a Feeling" (electric sitar) (US chart #5), "(Hey Won't You Play) Another Somebody Done Somebody Wrong Song" (US charts #1, Country charts #1)
- Bobby Womack - More Than I Can Stand
- Reggie Young - Memphis Grease
- Rattlesnake Annie - Free The Children

=== Albums ===
- King Solomon - Solomon Burke (1968)
- I'm in Love - Wilson Pickett (1968)
- I Wish I Knew - Solomon Burke (1968)
- Soulful - Dionne Warwick (1969)
- From Elvis in Memphis - Elvis Presley (1969)
- Memphis - Petula Clark (1970)
- Songs - Jackie DeShannon (1971)
- John Prine - John Prine (1971)
- Jackie - Jackie DeShannon (1972)
- Sweet Revenge - John Prine (1973)
- Raised on Rock / For Ol' Times Sake - Elvis Presley (1973)
- A White Sport Coat and a Pink Crustacean - Jimmy Buffett (1973)
- The Road - Johnny Rivers (1974)
- Good Times - Elvis Presley (1974)
- 7-Tease - Donovan (1974)
- A1A - Jimmy Buffett (1974)
- Okie - J. J. Cale (1974)
- Living and Dying in 3/4 Time - Jimmy Buffett (1974)
- Candi - Candi Staton (1974)
- Anka - Paul Anka (1974)
- Giant of Rock 'n' Roll - Ronnie Hawkins (1974)
- Kenny Rogers - Kenny Rogers (1976)
- Troubadour - J. J. Cale (1976)
- Regeneration - Roy Orbison (1977)
- Izitso - Cat Stevens (1977)
- Daytime Friends - Kenny Rogers (1977)
- Amy Grant - Amy Grant (1977)
- Act Like Nothing's Wrong - Al Kooper (1977)
- The Gambler - Kenny Rogers (1978)
- Kenny - Kenny Rogers (1979)
- Slow Dancing - Ben Moore(soul singer) (1979)
- Back to the Barrooms - Merle Haggard (1980)
- 9 to 5 and Odd Jobs - Dolly Parton (1980)
- Shades - J. J. Cale (1981)
- Love Me Tender - B.B. King (1982)
- Somewhere in the Stars - Rosanne Cash (1982)
- Grasshopper - J. J. Cale (1982)
- Always on My Mind - Willie Nelson (1982)
- Without a Song - Willie Nelson (1983)
- Riddles in the Sand - Jimmy Buffett (1984)
- Civilized Man - Joe Cocker (1984)
- City of New Orleans - Willie Nelson (1984)
- Last Mango in Paris - Jimmy Buffett (1985)
- Rose of My Heart - Nicolette Larson (1986)
- Floridays - Jimmy Buffett (1986)
- Light Years - Glen Campbell (1988)
- Seven Year Itch - Etta James (1988)
- What a Wonderful World - Willie Nelson (1988)
- White Limozeen - Dolly Parton (1989)
- A Horse Called Music - Willie Nelson (1989)
- Born for Trouble - Willie Nelson (1990)
- Walkin' in the Sun - Glen Campbell (1990)
- Stickin' to My Guns - Etta James (1990)
- Unconditional Love - Glen Campbell (1991)
- All I Can Be - Collin Raye (1991)
- Shania Twain - Shania Twain (1993)
- The Crossing - Paul Young (1993)
- Across the Borderline - Willie Nelson (1993)
- When Love Finds You - Vince Gill (1994)
- Healing Hands of Time - Willie Nelson (1994)
- Storm in the Heartland - Billy Ray Cyrus (1994)
- The Tattooed Heart - Aaron Neville (1995)
- Something Special - Dolly Parton (1995)
- Treasures - Dolly Parton (1996)
- Joy - Melissa Manchester (1997)
- Blue Nite Lounge - Dan Penn (2000)
- The Great Divide - Willie Nelson (2002)
- Make Do with What You Got - Solomon Burke (2005)
- Everlasting - Martina McBride (2014)
- A Fool to Care - Boz Scaggs (2015)
- Something About the Night - Dan Penn (2016)
