= Coral Reefer Band =

Touring and recording act of Jimmy Buffett

The Coral Reefer Band
- Jimmy Buffett and the Coral Reefer Band perform during their Summerzcool Tour in June 2009

Background information
- Origin: U.S.
- Genres: Country rock; Gulf and Western
- Years active: 1975–present
- Labels: ABC; Dunhill; MCA; Margaritaville; Island Def Jam; PolyGram; Mailboat; Atlantic; RCA
- Members: Mac McAnally; Doyle Grisham; Peter Mayer; Jim Mayer; Roger Guth; John Lovell; Tina Gullickson; Nadirah Shakoor; Eric Darken; Mick Utley; Scotty Emerick; Will Kimbrough; Roger Greenidge
- Past members: Jimmy Buffett; Michael Utley; Reggie Young; Roger Bartlett; Ralph MacDonald; Greg "Fingers" Taylor; David Briggs; Norbert Putnam; Harry Dailey; Kenny Buttrey; Sam Clayton; Robert Greenidge; Timothy B. Schmit; see list of former members for others

The Coral Reefer Band is the touring and recording band of American singer-songwriter Jimmy Buffett, backing him until Buffett's death in September 2023 and has continued on without him. The band's name alludes to both coral reefs (in line with Buffett's tropical-themed music) and "reefer" (slang for marijuana).

== With Buffett ==
Greg "Fingers" Taylor, an original Coral Reefer, discovered Buffett performing solo one evening at The Hub on the University of Southern Mississippi campus in 1970. This resulted in Taylor contributing harmonica accompaniment for part of the performance, the beginning of their long-term collaboration.

In 1975, Buffett formed the Coral Reefer Band. He credits his future wife for cleaning up their look, replacing their ripped Levi jeans and collarless shirts. The band was the opening act for the Eagles in August 1975.

The band performed their final concert with Buffett on May 6, 2023, in San Diego. Buffett made two further concert appearances, as an unannounced guest at concerts by Coral Reefer Band members, in Amagansett, New York, on June 11 and in Portsmouth, Rhode Island, on July 2, before his death in September of that year.

== After Buffett ==
On October 30, 2023, Mac McAnally stated in an interview that the Coral Reefer Band would continue touring and performing Buffett's music at his request, reiterating statements made by bandmate Robert Greenidge in a separate interview on September 9, 2023.

The band reunited for the first time since Buffett's passing on April 11, 2024, and served as the house band for the Keep the Party Going: A Tribute to Jimmy Buffett concert at the Hollywood Bowl. At the concert, McAnally introduced Scotty Emerick as a full-time member of the group.

In May 2024, the band played their first full show after Buffett's death (not counting the Hollywood Bowl tribute concert) at the New Orleans Jazz Fest, where they were joined by guest Sonny Landreth, who had also worked alongside Buffett and the band on various occasions before Buffett's death.

In June, the band announced they would be doing three shows in August as part of the Keep The Party Going Tour, at the Wharf Amphitheater in Orange Beach, Alabama, on August 1; the Cadence Bank Amphitheater at Chastain Park in Atlanta, Georgia on August 2; and the Riverbend Music Center in Cincinnati, Ohio on August 4. Proceeds from these shows went to the Buffett-founded nonprofit charity Singing for a Change. Will Kimbrough, one of Buffett's occasional collaborators and songwriting partners, joined the band at this time. The shows got a positive response from audiences. All three shows were sold-out or close to sellouts including over 15,000 people attending the Cincinnati show. The band indicated more dates would be added in the future. In December 2024 additional shows were announced for 2025: one on January 24 at the Hard Rock Hotels Etess Arena in Atlantic City, New Jersey and two scheduled for March in Jacksonville and Hollywood, Florida. The band announced at the Atlantic City show that several more shows will take place during the summer months of 2025.

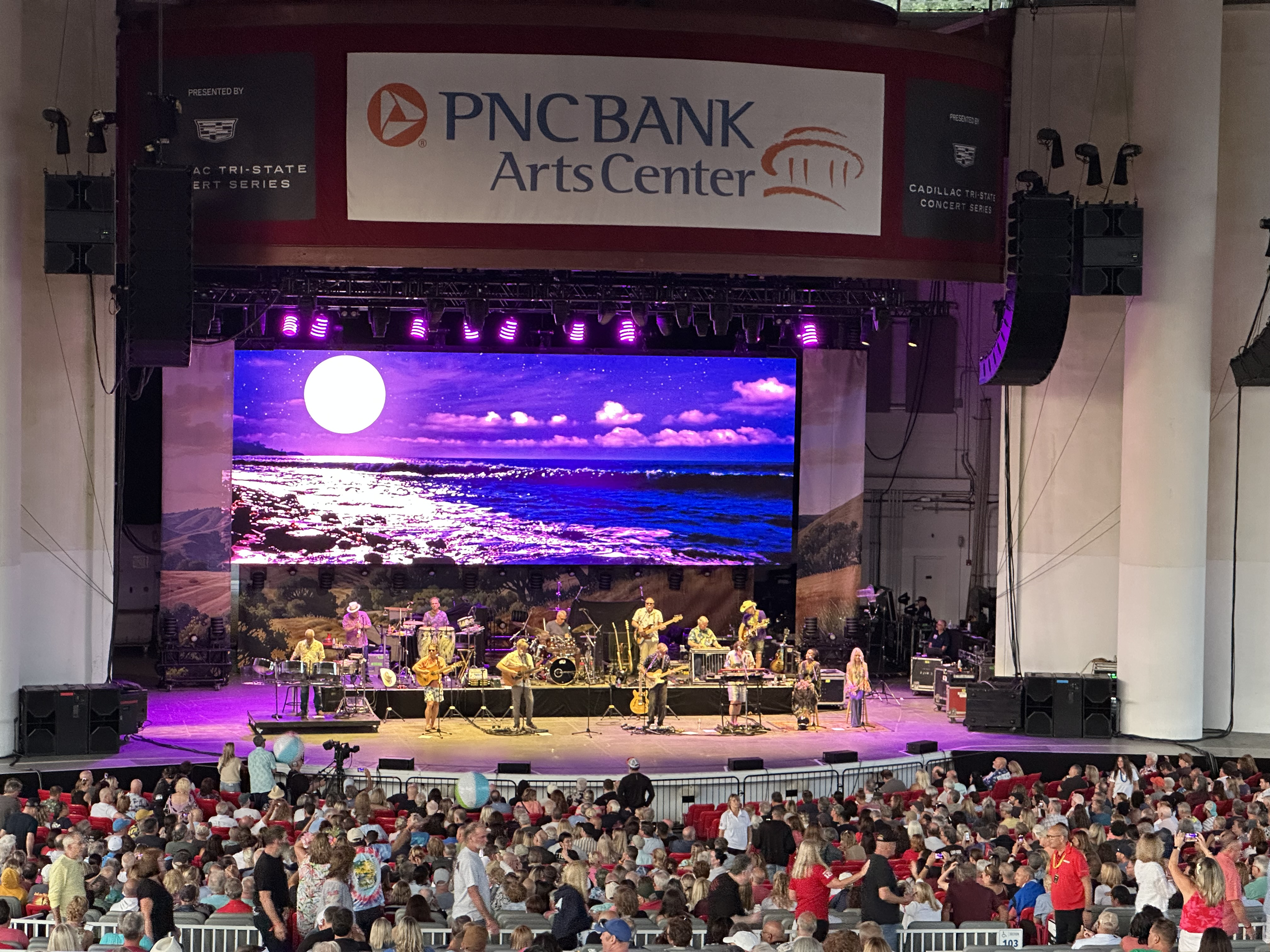
The Coral Reefer Band performs "A Pirate Looks at Forty" in 2025. An empty microphone stand at center stage represents the absence of Buffett.

In the post-Buffett era, Mac McAnally is the Coral Reefer bandleader. But shows are performed with an empty microphone at center stage, symbolizing the absence of Buffett. Lead vocals are distributed around the group, with McAnally and new member Scotty Emerick taking the most. A review of the Jacksonville show in The Florida Times-Union said, "How do you replace a legend like Jimmy Buffett? You don't, of course. ... But if you're his long-time Coral Reefer Band, you can still play his songs well enough ..."

In February, the band announced they would be going on tour as the opening act for the Doobie Brothers for 20 shows between August and September 2025. This was the first prolonged effort to keep the Coral Reefers going. Buffett and the Doobies had each opened for the other at various times during their careers, and the two shared some of the same sensibilities. A review in the Pittsburgh Post-Gazette noted that there was inevitably "less of the barefoot, carefree Parrothead vibe" than at Buffett shows but that "the talent runs deep in this crew and it did a stellar job with the music".

In January 2026, the Coral Reefer Band performed two sold out shows in Florida, one in Saint Petersburg, and the other in Key West, with the latter show marking the first time the band had performed in Buffett's adopted hometown of Key West since his passing in 2023. Both nights included a 30 song setlist of both classic and deep cut Buffett songs. Both of Buffett's sisters, Lulu and Laurie, attended the Key West show, as did his oldest daughter Savannah, who joined the Coral Reefer Band on stage for the song "Fins". This was the last time long time band member Robert Greenidge performed with the band, he died 4 months later. After these shows a 21-date US tour took place in summer .

Longtime member Robert Greenidge died in June 2026, from complications following a stroke. His brother Roger, also a steel drum player joined the band as the steel drum player in June 2026.

In the summer of 2026 The Coral Reefer Band did a 21 city "Keep The Party Going" tour as the sole headliner with no opening act. It was the first shows after Robert Greenidge died and the first with his brother Roger now part of the band. Most shows sold out and the tour ended in Boston with a sold-out show on the Boston Harbor waterfront. The band said they will be back on the road again in 2027.

== Members ==
=== Current line-up ===
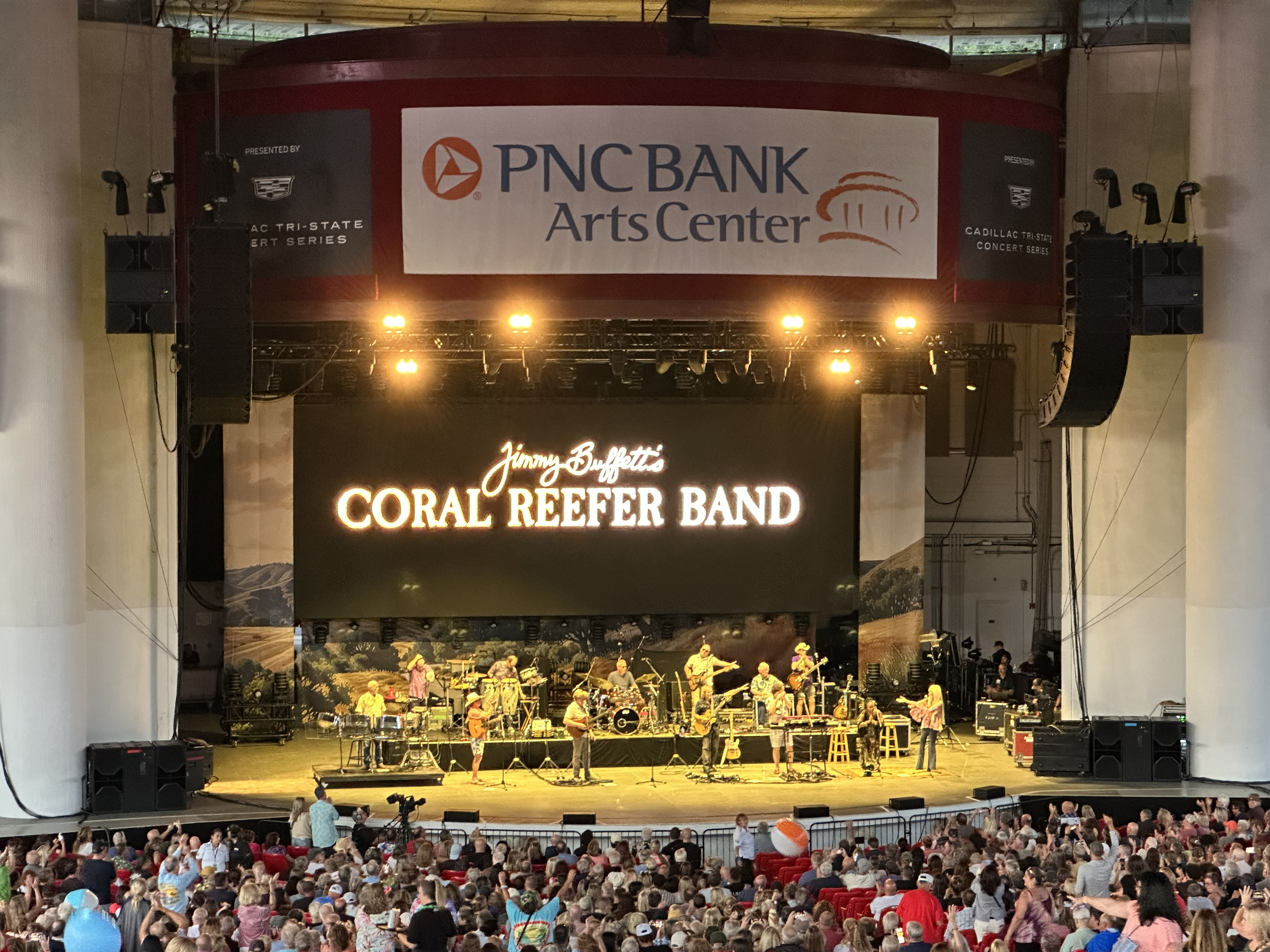
Band introductions, 2025, with Nadirah Shakoor receiving applause

As of 2026, the band's lineup consists of:

- Doyle Grisham – pedal steel guitar (1975–1976, 1981, 1998–present)
- Peter Mayer – harmony and backing vocals, lead guitar (1989–present)
- Jim Mayer – harmony and backing vocals, bass (1989–present)
- Roger Guth – drums (1989–present)
- John Lovell – trumpet (1992–present)
- Mac McAnally – lead vocals, harmony and backing vocals, rhythm and lead guitars, slide guitar, dobro (1994–present)
- Nadirah Shakoor – harmony and backing vocals, lead vocals (1995–present)
- Tina Gullickson – harmony and backing vocals, acoustic rhythm guitar (1995–present)
- Eric Darken – percussion (2011–present)
- Mick Utley - harmony and backing vocals, keyboards (2021–present)
- Scotty Emerick - lead vocals, harmony and backing vocals, guitar (2023–present)
- Will Kimbrough – lead vocals, harmony and backing vocals, guitar (2024–present; occasional guest 2003-2023)
- Roger Greenidge – steel drums (2026-present)

=== Former members ===
Former members of the Coral Reefer Band include:

- Dr. Kino Bachellier – percussion
- Doug Bartenfeld – guitar
- Roger Bartlett – harmony vocals, acoustic guitar, electric guitar. Wrote "Dallas". (1975–1977)
- M.L. Benoit – congas, percussion, backing vocals
- Matt Betton – drums
- David Briggs – piano (died 2025)
- Jimmy Buffett – vocals, rhythm guitar, ukulele (1975–2023; his death)
- Kenny Buttrey – drums, percussion (1977–1978; died 2004)
- Rich Calhoun – drums
- Hamilton Camp – guitar
- Buzz Cason – keyboards, backing vocals (died 2024)
- Barry Chance – lead guitar, backing vocals (died 2010)
- Marshall Chapman – guitar, backing vocals (1987); co-writer "Last Mango in Paris", writer "The Perfect Partner"
- Sam Clayton – backing vocals, congas, percussion (1982–1988)
- Vassar Clements – fiddle
- Dominic Cortese – accordion
- Sammy Creason – drums
- Claudia Cummings – backing vocals (1991–1997; died 2023)
- Harry Dailey – bass guitar, harmony and backing vocals. Co-writer "Volcano". (1975–1982; died 2003)
- Tim Drummond – bass guitar (1986–1988)
- Philip Fajardo – drums (1975–1976)
- Lanny Fiel – guitar
- Rick Fiel – bass guitar
- Daniel "Stiles" Francisco – trumpet
- Mike Gardner – drums (died 1991)
- Johnny Gimble – fiddle
- Randy Goodrum – keyboards
- Robert Greenidge – steel drums (1983–2026; his death)
- Dave Haney – bass guitar
- Mary Harris – backing vocals, vocal arrangements
- Hadley Hockensmith – bass
- Brie Howard – percussion, backing vocals
- Dena Iverson – backing vocals
- Michael Jeffry – guitar, harmony vocals
- Shane Keister – Moog synthesizer
- Don Kloetzke – backing vocals
- Tim Krekel – lead guitar, backing vocals
- Russ Kunkel – drums
- Amy Lee – saxophone. Co-writer of "Fruitcakes". (1991–2005)
- Larry Lee – guitar, drums, keyboards
- Josh Leo – guitar
- Ralph MacDonald – percussion (1974–2011; died 2011)
- Katherine Maisnik – backing vocals
- Deborah McColl – backing vocals
- Andy McMahon – organ, Fender Rhodes
- Vince Melamed – keyboards
- T.C. Mitchell – saxophone, flute (1994–2005)
- Farrell Morris – percussion
- Bob Naylor – harmonica, backing vocals
- The Neville Brothers — backing vocals, tambourine
- Penny Nichols – backing vocals, including on Son of a Son of a Sailor (died 2017)
- Jay Oliver – keyboards
- Tony Pace – drums
- Norbert Putnam – double bass
- Angel L Quinones Jr. – congas and percussion (1993-1994) - recorded on "Fruitcakes"
- Zachary Richard – acadian accordion
- Phil Royster – congas
- Timothy B. Schmit – bass guitar, harmony and backing vocals, coined the term Parrotheads (1983-1986)
- Keith Sykes – guitar
- "Blind" Jay Spell – keyboards (died 2011)
- Paul Tabet – drums
- Greg "Fingers" Taylor – harmonica, keyboards, percussion, backing vocals (1975–2000, 2007; died 2023)
- Bobby Thompson – banjo
- Michael Utley – keyboards (1975–2024)
- Jerry Jeff Walker – guitar, backing vocals, composer
- Willie Weeks - bass
- Bergen White – trombone
- Ed "Lump" Williams – bass guitar
- Reggie Young – electric lead guitar (died 2019)

== Honorary members and special guests ==
Many artists have recorded and/or appeared on stage with Buffett, earning them status as honorary Coral Reefers. Some of the more notable names are listed here.

- Clint Black – vocals, harmonica
- Ed Bradley – vocals, tambourine
- Paul Brady - vocals, guitar
- Zac Brown – guitar and vocals
- Freddie Buffett – background vocals
- Kenny Chesney - vocals, guitar
- Priscilla Coolidge - vocals
- Rita Coolidge – vocals
- Steve Cropper – guitar
- David Crosby - vocals, guitar
- Sheryl Crow – vocals
- Ilo Ferreira – vocals, guitar
- Ric Flair – drums and background "woo's"
- Harrison Ford – whip cracks
- Glenn Frey – guitar, background vocals
- Johnny Gimble – fiddle
- Steve Goodman – guitar
- Emmylou Harris - vocals
- John Hiatt – guitar
- Alan Jackson – vocals
- Caroline Jones - harmony and backing vocals, guitar (2017-2019, 2024)
- Toby Keith - vocals, guitar
- Eric "White Chocolate" Kincaid – bus driver
- Earl Klugh – guitar
- Mark Knopfler - guitar
- Bill Kreutzmann – drums
- Miranda Lambert - vocals
- Sonny Landreth – slide guitar
- Nicolette Larsen – vocals
- Huey Lewis – vocals, harmonica
- Dave Loggins - vocals
- Martina McBride - vocals
- Paul McCartney – vocals, bass
- The Memphis Horns - brass
- The Oak Ridge Boys – vocals
- Roy Orbison – vocals
- Bill Payne – Keyboard
- Sean Payton – bongos (2012)
- Jake Shimabukuro – ukulele (2005–2009, 2024)
- JD Souther – backing vocals
- James Taylor – vocals
- Grover Washington Jr. – saxophone
- J. J. Watt – percussion
- Brian Wilson – vocals
- Steve Winwood – vocals, organ

== Tours ==
With Jimmy Buffett

- A Pink Crustacean Tour (1976)
- Changes in Latitudes, Changes in Attitudes Tour (1977)
- Cheeseburger in Paradise Tour (1978)
- You Had to Be There Tour / Volcano Tour (1979)
- A Hot Dog & A Road Map Tour (1980)
- Coconut Telegraph Tour (1981)
- Somewhere over China Tour (with broken leg) (1982)
- Homecoming Tour (1982)
- The Six-Stop American Tour (1983)
- Feeding Frenzy Tour (1984)
- Last Mango in Paris Tour (1985)
- Floridays Tour / World Tour of Florida (1986)
- A Parrot Looks at Forty Tour (1987)
- Cheap Vacation Tour / Hot Water Tour (1988)
- Off to See the Lizard Tour / Buffett Does Ballads Tour (1989)
- Jimmy's Jump Up Tour (1990)
- Outpost Tour (1991)
- Recession Recess Tour (1992)
- Chameleon Caravan Tour (1993)
- Fruitcakes Tour (1994)
- Domino College Tour (1995)
- Banana Wind Tour (1996)
- Havana Daydreamin' Tour (1997)
- Don't Stop the Carnival Tour (1998)
- Beach House on the Moon Tour (1999)
- Tuesdays, Thursdays, Saturdays Tour (2000)
- A Beach Odyssey Tour (2001)
- Far Side of the World Tour (2002)
- Tiki Time Tour (2003)
- License to Chill Tour (2004)
- A Salty Piece of Land Tour (2005)
- Party at the End of the World Tour (2006)
- Bama Breeze Tour (2007)
- Year of Still Here Tour (2008)
- Summerzcool Tour (2009)
- Under the Big Top Tour (2010)
- Welcome to Fin Land Tour (2011)
- Lounging at the Lagoon Tour (2012–13)
- Songs from St. Somewhere Tour (2013–14)
- This One's for You Tour (2014–15)
- Workin' n' Playin' Tour (2015–16)
- I Don't Know Tour (2016–18)
- Son of a Son of a Sailor Tour (2018–19)
- Life on the Flip Side Tour (2021–22)
- Second Wind Tour (2023)

Without Jimmy Buffett

- Keep the Party Going Tour (2024-2026)
