= Greg "Fingers" Taylor =

American harmonica player (1952–2023)

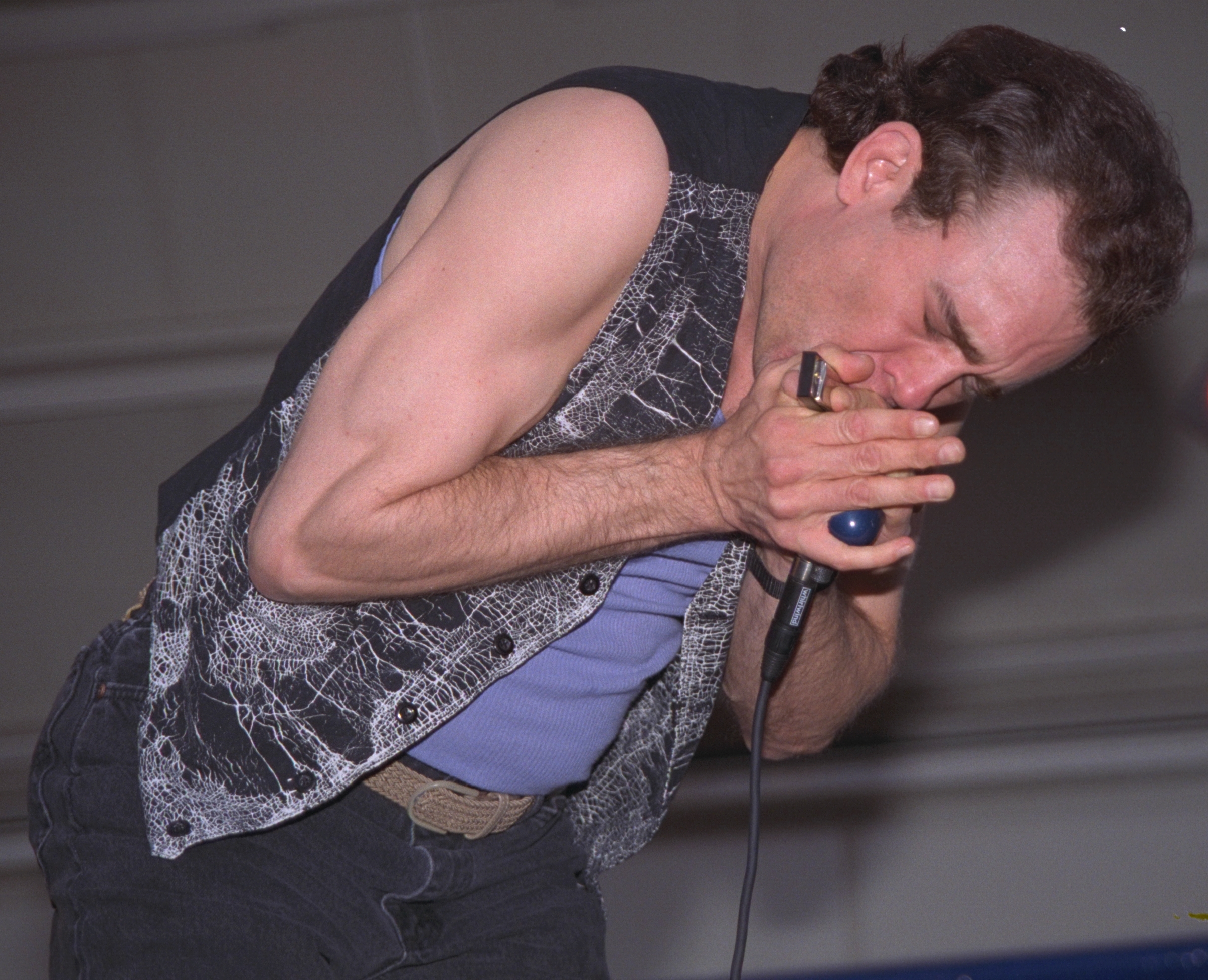
- Taylor performing at the 1996 Riverwalk Blues Festival

Background information
- Also known as: "Fingers", The Harpoon Man
- Born: June 3, 1952; Wichita, Kansas, U.S.
- Died: November 23, 2023 (aged 71)
- Genres: Rock and roll, blues, country, Gulf and Western
- Occupations: Musician, songwriter
- Instruments: Vocals, harmonica, keyboards
- Years active: 1969–2014

Greg "Fingers" Taylor (June 3, 1952 – November 23, 2023) was an American harmonica player, best known for his work with Jimmy Buffett's Coral Reefer Band.

== Career ==
Greg Taylor was born in Wichita, Kansas, on June 3, 1952, where he attended Wichita North High School.

Taylor and Buffett met in 1970 when Taylor was a student at The University of Southern Mississippi. Soon after the two met, Taylor joined Larry Raspberry and The Highsteppers. In 1974, Buffett called Taylor to ask him to join the first official Coral Reefer Band. Taylor continued to play in the band until 2000. Buffett was booked to open for the Association at Arkansas State University in late 1972. Taylor appeared with Buffett at that show.

Taylor's nickname, "Fingers", was given to him in 1969 by John "Johnny Rock" Buffaloe (so nicknamed by Taylor) during their time in The Buttermilk Blues Band in Jackson, Mississippi. At the time, Taylor played keyboards for the band, hence the nickname "Fingers." Taylor began playing harmonica during his time in the band.

Taylor released five studio albums: Harpoon Man (1984), Chest Pains (1989), New Fingerprints (1991), Old Rock 'n' Roller (1996) and Hi Fi Baby (2003). He has also released two compilation albums: Greatest Hits (1998) and Back to the Blues (2000).

Over the years, Buffett recorded a couple of Taylor's songs. "Big Rig" was included on Buffett's 1976 album Havana Daydreamin' and Taylor and Buffett co-wrote "Miss You So Badly" included on Buffett's 1977 album Changes in Latitudes, Changes in Attitudes. Buffett and the Coral Reefer Band also included "Dixie Diner", originally recorded by Larry Raspberry and The Highsteppers, on Buffett's 1978 live album You Had to Be There.

Buffett and Taylor also teamed up on "Some White People (Can Dance)," a staple of Taylor's repertoire. The song was included on Taylor's 1989 album Chest Pains.

From 2000 until 2005, Taylor toured and recorded with the trop rock singer-songwriter Don Middlebrook and his band Living Soul. Together they recorded four albums: I Can't Spell Caribbean, Changing Lanes, Boat Drink Island and Traveling Music. Some of Taylor's finest work is found on Traveling Music, particularly on the song, "Like a River She Rolls".

In 1998, Taylor appeared with A1A – The Official and Original Jimmy Buffett Tribute Show on their debut album, A1A Live. He performed with A1A many times throughout the 1990s and 2000s.

As of 2006, Taylor was regularly touring with the singer-songwriter, K.D. Moore and has undertaken some shows with the Atlanta-based singer-songwriter Jim Asbell. He also toured in 2007 with another singer-songwriter, Hugo Duarte from North Carolina. Taylor is featured on K.D. Moore's 2004 live album Live at the Tin Goose Saloon, Moore's 2006 studio album, Kickin' It Island Style and was a guest artist on Asbell's 2007 studio release, Tropiholics.

At the Riverbend Music Center in Cincinnati, Ohio, on June 8, 2006, Taylor joined Buffett and the Coral Reefer Band on stage.

Taylor had two children, Steven and Hunter. Steven is a blues guitarist and is continuing his father's legacy. Hunter has taken up a career as an audio/visual technician.

Taylor died on November 23, 2023, at the age of 71. He had been suffering from Alzheimer's disease.

== Discography ==
- Harpoon Man (1984)
- Chest Pains (1989)
- New Fingerprints (1991)
- Old Rock 'n' Roller (1996)
- Greatest Hits (1998)
- Back to the Blues (2000)
- Hi Fi Baby (2003)
