= Pirates and Poets =

Studio album by Bertie Higgins
- Released: 1983
- Recorded: October 1982 – January 1983
- Studios: Pyramid Eye's (Lookout Mountain, Georgia); Southern Tracks (Atlanta, Georgia); Creative Workshop (Berry Hill, Tennessee)
- Genre: Tropical rock
- Length: 42:25
- Label: Sony
- Producers: Sonny Limbo; Scott MacLellan

Bertie Higgins chronology
Just Another Day in Paradise (1982)	Pirates and Poets (1983)	Gone with the Wind (1985)

Pirates and Poets is an album by the American singer-songwriter Bertie Higgins, released in 1983. The first single was ""When You Fall in Love (Like I Fell in Love with You)".

Roy Orbison sang on "Leah". The CD version of the album includes Higgins's hit single Key Largo as a bonus track.

== Critical reception ==
The Philadelphia Inquirer called Higgins "just about the most weepy, sentimental, insufferable singer-songwriter in existence," and ironically deemed the album, "in its own way, a demented masterpiece."

== Track listing ==
1. "As Time Goes By" (Herman Hupfeld) - 0:45
2. "Pirates and Poets" (Bertie Higgins, Sonny Limbo) - 3:11
3. "When You Fall in Love (Like I Fell in Love with You)" (Higgins, Limbo, Jeff Pinkham) - 3:36
4. "Leah" (Roy Orbison) - 3:28
5. "Under a Blue Moon" (Gary Baker, Quentin Powers) - 3:55
6. "Tokyo Joe" (Higgins, Limbo) - 3:25
7. "Beneath the Island Light" (Higgins, Limbo) - 4:04
8. "Only Yesterday" (Higgins) - 3:50
9. "Marianna" (Higgins) - 4:09
10. "Pleasure Pier" (Higgins) - 3:28
11. "Never Looking Back" (Higgins, Deniece Dupey) - 7:18
12. "As Time Goes By (Reprise)" (Hupfeld) - 1:15

== Personnel ==
Musicians

- Bertie Higgins – vocals, acoustic guitars
- John Healy – acoustic piano, organ, synthesizers
- Steve Nathan – acoustic piano, organ, synthesizers
- Ken Bell – acoustic guitars, electric guitars
- Shelton Irwin – acoustic guitars, electric guitars
- Kenny Mims – acoustic guitars, electric guitars
- Jeffrey Dale Pinkham – bouzouki, mandolin
- Gary Baker – bass guitar
- Owen Hale – drums
- Mickey Buckins – percussion
- Edward Higgins – percussion
- Doug Johnson – percussion
- Mark O'Connor – fiddle
- Ed Leamon – saxophones
- Scott MacLellan – flute
- Linda Penny Baker – oboe
- Albert Coleman's Atlanta Pops – orchestra (1)
- The Atlanta Strings – strings
- Wayne Mosley – string arrangements and conductor
- Karen Norwood – copyist
- Roy Orbison – vocals (4)

The "Doo-Bobs" (backing vocals)

- Gary Baker – BGV arrangements and conductor
- Cathy Dover, Bertie Higgins, Beverly Higgins, Edward Higgins, Gloria Higgins-Burke, Mike Jones, Phyllis & Manny Loiacono, Scott MacLellan, David Powell, Mike Sullivan and Cheryl Wilson – singers

Production

- Sonny Limbo – producer, additional engineer
- Scott MacLellan – producer, additional engineer
- Doug Johnson – engineer
- Brent Maher – additional engineer
- Jim Stablie – additional engineer
- Glenn Meadows – digital consultant at Masterfonics (Nashville, Tennessee)
- Bertie Higgins – cover concept
- Mike McCarty – cover concept, cover artwork, design
- Joe Kahl – cover photography
- Tom Corcoran – additional photography
- Joel Cherry – direction
