= Steve Nathan =

American keyboardist (born 1951)

- Born: Steven Jay Nathan; April 20, 1951 (age 75); Buffalo, New York, U.S.
- Genres: Rock music, country music
- Occupation: Musician
- Instrument: Keyboards
- Years active: 1978–present
- Formerly of: Muscle Shoals Rhythm Section
- Website: stevenathanmusic.com

Steven Jay Nathan (born April 20, 1951) is an American keyboardist. He is known for his session work in Muscle Shoals and Nashville studios.

== Biography ==
Nathan was born and raised in Buffalo, New York. In 1977, Nathan moved to Muscle Shoals, Alabama. After touring with LeBlanc and Carr, he participated in the recording of Lenny LeBlanc’s first solo record. For the next 14 years, Steve played on records produced by Rick Hall at FAME Studios, often teaming with Roger Hawkins on drums and David Hood on bass.

In 1991, Nathan moved to Nashville, where he became a member of the A-Team of session musicians.

=== Awards ===
In 2001, Nathan became a member of the Buffalo Music Hall of Fame.

In 2007, Nathan won The Academy of Country Music's Top Piano/Keyboards Player of the Year Award.

Nathan was named "Keyboardist of the Year" by MusicRow Magazine for 13 consecutive years.

== Discography ==
This section contains a partial list of albums Nathan has contributed to.

=== 1978 – 1982 ===
- 1978: Pete Carr – Multiple Flash (Big Tree)
- 1978: Dobie Gray – Midnight Diamond (Infinity)
- 1979: Dobie Gray – Dobie Gray (Infinity)
- 1979: Lobo – Lobo (MCA)
- 1979: Eddy Mitchell – C'Est Bien Fait (Barclay)
- 1980: Birtles & Goble – The Last Romance (Capitol)
- 1980: David Allan Coe – I've Got Something to Say (Columbia)
- 1980: Gail Davies – The Game (Warner Bros.)
- 1980: Janie Fricke – From the Heart (Columbia)
- 1980: Spyro Gyra – Catching the Sun (MCA)
- 1981: Baby Brother – Baby Brother (Cotillion)
- 1981: The Dillman Band – Lovin' the Night Away (RCA Victor)
- 1981: Eddie Kendricks – Love Keys (Atlantic)
- 1981: Frederick Knight – Knight Time (Juana)
- 1982: Levon Helm – Levon Helm (Capitol)
- 1982: Bertie Higgins – Just Another Day in Paradise (Epic)
- 1982: The Oak Ridge Boys – Christmas (MCA)
- 1982: Jerry Reed – The Bird (RCA Victor)
- 1982: Jerry Reed – The Man with the Golden Thumb (RCA Victor)
- 1982: Hank Williams Jr. – High Notes (Elektra)

=== 1983 – 1986 ===
- 1983: Clarence Carter – Love Me With a Feeling (Gallo)
- 1983: Millie Jackson – E.S.P. (Extra Sexual Persuasion) (Sire)
- 1983: Jimmy Jones – Let's Talk about Jesus (Savoy)
- 1983: Bill Lamb – Riff Rockin' (Warner Bros.)
- 1983: Mac McAnally – Nothing But the Truth (Geffen)
- 1983: Percy Sledge – Percy! (Charly)
- 1983: Hank Williams, Jr. – Strong Stuff (Elektra)
- 1984: Clarence Carter – Singing for My Supper (Big C)
- 1984: Deborah Allen – Let Me Be the First (RCA)
- 1984: Jerry Lee Lewis – I Am What I Am (MCA)
- 1985: Linda Clifford – My Heart's on Fire (Red Label)
- 1985: The Forester Sisters – The Forester Sisters (Warner Bros.)
- 1985: Mink DeVille – Sportin' Life (Polydor)
- 1986: Billy "Crash" Craddock – Crash Craddock (Dot)
- 1986: Lacy J. Dalton – Highway Diner (Columbia)
- 1986: Steve Earle – Guitar Town (MCA)
- 1986: The Forester Sisters – Perfume, Ribbons & Pearls (Warner Bros.)
- 1986: Luther Ingram – Luther Ingram (Profile)
- 1986: The Kendalls – Fire at First Sight (MCA)
- 1986: The Oak Ridge Boys – Christmas Again (MCA)

=== 1987 – 1992 ===
- 1987: T. Graham Brown – Brilliant Conversationalist (Capitol)
- 1987: The Forester Sisters – You Again (Warner Bros.)
- 1987: Johnny Paycheck – Modern Times (Mercury)
- 1987: T. G. Sheppard – One for the Money (Columbia)
- 1988: Glenn Frey – Soul Searchin' (MCA)
- 1988: Dana McVicker – Dana McVicker (Capitol)
- 1989: Bobby "Blue" Bland – Midnight Run (Malaco)
- 1989: Connie Francis – Where the Hits Are (Malaco)
- 1989: Johnnie Taylor – Crazy 'bout You (Malaco)
- 1990: Mark Chesnutt – Too Cold at Home (MCA)
- 1990: Connie Francis – Among My Souvenirs (Malaco)
- 1990: Steve Wariner – Laredo (MCA)
- 1991: Bobby "Blue" Bland – Portrait of the Blues (Malaco)
- 1991: Billy Dean – Billy Dean (Liberty)
- 1991: Doug Stone – I Thought It Was You (Epic)
- 1991: Tony Joe White – Closer to the Truth (Swamp)
- 1992: Alabama – American Pride (RCA Victor)
- 1992: Joan Baez – Play Me Backwards (Virgin)
- 1992: Mark Chesnutt – Longnecks & Short Stories (MCA)
- 1992: Holly Dunn – Getting It Dunn (Warner Bros.)
- 1992: Vince Gill – I Still Believe in You (MCA)
- 1992: Alan Jackson – New Traditional (Americana)
- 1992: Wynonna Judd – Wynonna (Curb / MCA)
- 1992: John Michael Montgomery – Life's a Dance (Atlantic)
- 1992: Doug Stone – From the Heart (Epic)
- 1992: Michelle Wright – Now and Then (Arista)
- 1992: Trisha Yearwood – Hearts in Armor (MCA)

=== 1993 – 1994 ===
- 1993: Mark Chesnutt – Almost Goodbye (MCA)
- 1983: Darryl & Don Ellis – Day in the Sun (Epic)
- 1993: John Jarvis – Balancing Act (Liberty)
- 1993: Wynonna Judd – Tell Me Why (Curb)
- 1993: Dude Mowrey – Dude Mowrey (Arista)
- 1993: Ronna Reeves – What Comes Naturally (Mercury)
- 1993: Clay Walker – Clay Walker (Giant)
- 1993: Trisha Yearwood – The Song Remembers When (MCA)
- 1994: David Ball – Thinkin' Problem (Warner Bros.)
- 1994: Mark Chesnutt – What a Way to Live (Decca)
- 1994: Cleve Francis – You've Got Me Now (Liberty)
- 1994: Vince Gill – When Love Finds You (MCA)
- 1994: Michael James – Closer to the Fire (Reunion)
- 1994: Lenny LeBlanc – All My Dreams (Integrity Music)
- 1994: Reba McEntire – Read My Mind (MCA)
- 1994: Jamie O'Hara – Rise Above It (RCA)
- 1994: Pearl River – Pearl River (Liberty)
- 1994: Prescott-Brown – Already Restless (Columbia)
- 1994: George Strait – Lead On (MCA)
- 1994: Clay Walker – If I Could Make a Living (Giant)
- 1994: Michelle Wright – The Reasons Why (Arista)

=== 1995 – 1996 ===
- 1995: 4 Runner – 4 Runner (Polydor Nashville)
- 1995: Alabama – In Pictures (RCA)
- 1995: Tracy Byrd – Love Lessons (MCA)
- 1995: Deana Carter – Did I Shave My Legs For This? (Capitol Nashville)
- 1995: Mark Collie – Tennessee Plates (Giant)
- 1995: Joe Diffie – Life's So Funny (Epic)
- 1995: Ty England – Ty England (RCA)
- 1995: Ty Herndon – What Mattered Most (Epic)
- 1995: Tim McGraw – All I Want (Curb)
- 1995: Martina McBride – Wild Angels (RCA)
- 1995: Reba McEntire – Starting Over (MCA)
- 1995: Rita MacNeil – Porch Songs (EMI)
- 1995: Dolly Parton – Something Special (Columbia)
- 1995: Ronna Reeves – After the Dance (River North Nashville)
- 1995: Sawyer Brown – This Thing Called Wantin' and Havin' It All (Curb)
- 1995: Victoria Shaw – In Full View (Reprise)
- 1995: Dusty Springfield – A Very Fine Love (Columbia)
- 1995: Russ Taff – Winds of Change (Warner Alliance)
- 1995: B. J. Thomas – I Believe (Warner Resound)
- 1995: Trisha Yearwood – Thinkin' About You (MCA)
- 1996: Rhett Akins – Somebody New (MCA)
- 1996: John Berry – Faces (Capitol Nashville)
- 1996: Paul Brandt – Calm Before the Storm (Reprise)
- 1996: Terri Clark – Just the Same (Mercury)
- 1996: Billy Dean – It's What I Do (Capitol)
- 1996: Ty England – Two Ways to Fall (RCA)
- 1996: Vince Gill – High Lonesome Sound (MCA)
- 1996: Ty Herndon – Living in a Moment (Epic)
- 1996: Wynonna Judd – Revelations (Curb)
- 1996: Mark Knopfler – Golden Heart (Warner Bros.)
- 1996: Jeane Manson – Country Girl (Arcade)
- 1996: Jo Dee Messina – Jo Dee Messina (Curb)
- 1996: John Michael Montgomery – What I Do the Best (Atlantic)
- 1996: David Lee Murphy – Gettin' Out the Good Stuff (MCA)
- 1996: LeAnn Rimes – Blue (Curb)
- 1996: Marty Stuart – Honky Tonkin's What I Do Best (MCA)
- 1996: Lari White – Don't Fence Me In (RCA)
- 1996: Trisha Yearwood – Everybody Knows (MCA)

=== 1997 – 1998 ===
- 1997: Beth Nielsen Chapman – Sand and Water (Reprise)
- 1997: Mark Chesnutt – Thank God for Believers (Decca)
- 1997: Bill Hullett – Two-Lane Blacktop (Vertical)
- 1997: Toby Keith – Dream Walkin' (Mercury)
- 1997: The Kinleys – Just Between You and Me (Epic)
- 1997: Jim Lauderdale – Whisper (BNA)
- 1997: Terry McMillan – Somebody's Comin' (Giant)
- 1997: Lorrie Morgan – Shakin' Things Up (BNA)
- 1997: David Lee Murphy – We Can't All Be Angels (MCA)
- 1997: Regina Regina – Regina Regina (Giant)
- 1997: LeAnn Rimes – You Light Up My Life: Inspirational Songs (Curb)
- 1997: George Strait – Carrying Your Love With Me (MCA)
- 1997: William Topley – Black River (Mercury)
- 1997: Clay Walker – Rumor Has It (Giant)
- 1997: Bryan White – The Right Place (Asylum)
- 1997: Lee Ann Womack – Lee Ann Womack (Decca)
- 1997: Chely Wright – Let Me In (MCA Nashville)
- 1998: Deana Carter – Everything's Gonna Be Alright (Capitol Nashville)
- 1998: Jim Collins – The Next Step (Arista Nashville)
- 1998: Ty Herndon – Big Hopes (Epic)
- 1998: Faith Hill – Faith (Warner Bros.)
- 1998: Danni Leigh – 29 Nights (MCA)
- 1998: Martina McBride – White Christmas (RCA)
- 1998: Jo Dee Messina – I'm Alright (Curb)
- 1998: Olivia Newton-John – Back With a Heart (MCA Nashville)
- 1998: Collin Raye – The Walls Came Down (Epic)
- 1998: LeAnn Rimes – Sittin' on Top of the World (Curb)
- 1998: George Strait – One Step at a Time (MCA Nashville)
- 1998: William Topley – Mixed Blessing (Mercury)
- 1998: Steve Wariner – Burnin' the Roadhouse Down (Capitol)

=== 1999 – 2000 ===
- 1999: Atlanta Rhythm Section – Eufaula (Platinum Entertainment)
- 1999: Brooks & Dunn – Tight Rope (Arista Nashville)
- 1999: Tracy Byrd – It's About Time (RCA)
- 1999: Kenny Chesney – Everywhere We Go (BNA)
- 1999: Mark Chesnutt – I Don't Want to Miss a Thing (Decca)
- 1999: Jennifer Day – The Fun of Your Love (BNA)
- 1999: Dixie Chicks – Fly (Monument)
- 1999: Faith Hill – Breathe (Warner Bros.)
- 1999: Toby Keith – How Do You Like Me Now?! (DreamWorks)
- 1999: Lonestar – Lonely Grill (BNA)
- 1999: Tim McGraw – A Place in the Sun (Curb)
- 1999: Montgomery Gentry – Tattoos & Scars (Columbia)
- 1999: George Strait – Always Never the Same (MCA Nashville)
- 1999: Steve Wariner – Two Teardrops (Capitol)
- 2000: Alabama – When It All Goes South (RCA)
- 2000: Jessica Andrews – Who I Am (DreamWorks)
- 2000: Lisa Angelle – Lisa Angelle (DreamWorks)
- 2000: Billy Ray Cyrus – Southern Rain (Monument)
- 2000: Sara Evans – Born to Fly (RCA)
- 2000: Vince Gill – Let's Make Sure We Kiss Goodbye (MCA Nashville)
- 2000: Sonya Isaacs – Sonya Isaacs (Lyric Street)
- 2000: Wynonna Judd – New Day Dawning (Mercury / Curb)
- 2000: The Kinleys – II (Epic)
- 2000: Jo Dee Messina – Burn (Curb)
- 2000: George Strait – George Strait (MCA Nashville)
- 2000: Aaron Tippin – People Like Us (Lyric Street)
- 2000: Steve Wariner – Faith in You (Capitol Nashville)
- 2000: Lee Ann Womack – I Hope You Dance (MCA Nashville)
- 2000: Trisha Yearwood – Real Live Woman (MCA Nashville)

=== 2001 – 2004 ===
- 2001: 3 of Hearts – 3 of Hearts (RCA)
- 2001: Brooks & Dunn – Steers & Stripes (Arista Nashville)
- 2001: Mary Chapin Carpenter – Time* Sex* Love* (Columbia)
- 2001: Faith Hill – There You'll Be (Warner Bros.)
- 2001: Jewel – This Way (Atlantic)
- 2001: Toby Keith – Pull My Chain (DreamWorks)
- 2001: Tim McGraw – Set This Circus Down (Curb)
- 2001: SHeDAISY – The Whole SHeBANG (Lyric Street)
- 2001: George Strait – The Road Less Traveled (MCA Nashville)
- 2002: Kenny Chesney – No Shoes, No Shirt, No Problems (BNA)
- 2002: Faith Hill – Cry (Warner Bros.)
- 2002: Toby Keith – Unleashed (DreamWorks)
- 2002: Tim McGraw – Tim McGraw and the Dancehall Doctors (Curb)
- 2002: Olivia Newton-John – (2) (Festival Mushroom)
- 2002: Rascal Flatts – Melt (Lyric Street)
- 2003: Gary Allan – See if I Care (MCA Nashville)
- 2003: Wynonna Judd – What the World Needs Now is Love (Curb)
- 2003: Toby Keith – Shock'n Y'all (DreamWorks)
- 2003: Kenny Rogers – Back to the Well (Sanctuary)
- 2003: George Strait – Honkytonkville (MCA Nashville)
- 2003: Josh Turner – Long Black Train (MCA Nashville)
- 2004: Andy Griggs – This I Gotta See (RCA)
- 2004: Carolyn Dawn Johnson – Dress Rehearsal (Arista Nashville)
- 2004: Willie Nelson – It Always Will Be (Lost Highway)
- 2004: Keith Urban – Be Here (Capitol Nashville)
- 2004: Phil Vassar – Shaken Not Stirred (Arista Nashville)
- 2004: Gretchen Wilson – Here for the Party (Epic)

=== 2005 – 2008 ===
- 2005: Trace Adkins – Songs About Me (Capitol Nashville)
- 2005: Kenny Chesney – The Road and the Radio (BNA)
- 2005: Jace Everett – Jace Everett (Epic)
- 2005: Toby Keith – Honkytonk University (DreamWorks)
- 2005: Joe Nichols – III (Universal South)
- 2005: LeAnn Rimes – This Woman (Curb)
- 2005: George Strait – Somewhere Down in Texas (MCA Nashville)
- 2005: Carrie Underwood – Some Hearts (Arista Nashville)
- 2005: Gretchen Wilson – All Jacked Up (Epic)
- 2006: Bob Seger – Face the Promise (Capitol)
- 2006: George Strait – It Just Comes Natural (MCA Nashville)
- 2007: Bon Jovi – Lost Highway (Island)
- 2007: Toby Keith – Big Dog Daddy (Show Dog Nashville)
- 2007: Tracy Lawrence – For the Love (Rocky Comfort/Co5)
- 2007: LeAnn Rimes – Family (Curb)
- 2007: Gretchen Wilson – One of the Boys (Sony BMG)
- 2007: Trisha Yearwood – Heaven, Heartache and the Power of Love (Big Machine)
- 2008: Toby Keith – That Don't Make Me a Bad Guy (Show Dog Nashville)
- 2008: George Strait – Troubadour (Hump Head)
- 2008: Randy Travis – Around the Bend (Cozat)

=== 2009 – 2014 ===
- 2009: Reba McEntire – Keep on Loving You (The Valory Music Co)
- 2009: Martina McBride – Shine (RCA)
- 2009: George Strait – Twang (Hump Head)
- 2010: Gary Allan – Get Off on the Pain (MCA Nashville)
- 2010: Joe Cocker – Hard Knocks (429)
- 2010: Toby Keith – Bullets in the Gun (Show Dog-Universal)
- 2010: Josh Turner – Haywire (MCA Nashville)
- 2011: Lauren Alaina – Wildflower (Mercury Nashville)
- 2011: Terri Clark – Roots and Wings (Hump Head)
- 2011: Sara Evans – Stronger (Sony)
- 2011: Toby Keith – Clancy's Tavern (Hump Head)
- 2011: George Strait – Here for a Good Time (MCA Nashville)
- 2011: Chris Young – Neon (Sony)
- 2012: Troy Cassar-Daley – Home (Liberation Music)
- 2012: Toby Keith – Hope on the Rocks (Show Dog-Universal Music)
- 2012: Tim McGraw – Emotional Traffic (Curb)
- 2012: Lionel Richie – Tuskegee (Mercury)
- 2013: Gary Allan – Set You Free (MCA Nashville)
- 2013: Toby Keith – Drinks After Work (Show Dog-Universal Music)
- 2013: Tim McGraw – Two Lanes of Freedom (Big Machine)
- 2013: George Strait – Love is Everything (MCA Nashville)
- 2013: Chris Young – A.M. (RCA)
- 2014: Tim McGraw – Sundown Heaven Town (Big Machine)
- 2014: Jo Dee Messina – Me (Dreambound)

=== 2015 – present ===
- 2015: Toby Keith – 35 MPH Town (Show Dog Nashville)
- 2015: Reba McEntire – Love Somebody (Starstruck)
- 2015: Tim McGraw – Damn Country Music (Big Machine)
- 2016: John Berry – What I Love the Most (Mansion)
- 2016: Mark Chesnutt – Tradition Lives (BFD / Red River)
- 2016: Randy Houser – Fired Up (BMG / Stoney Creek)
- 2016: Cyndi Lauper – Detour (Sire)
- 2016: Faith Hill – Deep Tracks (Warner Bros.)
- 2016: Craig Morgan – A Whole Lot More to Me (Black River)
- 2016: Joanne Shaw Taylor – Wild (Axehouse)
- 2017: Toby Keith – The Bus Songs (Show Dog Nashville)
- 2017: Joe Nichols – Never Gets Old (Red Bow)
- 2017: Charley Pride – Music in My Heart (Music City)
- 2026: Brandon Flowers – Thrasher (Island)
