= The Christmas Shoes =

The Christmas Shoes may refer to:

- "The Christmas Shoes" (song), a 2000 song by the Christian group NewSong
  - The Christmas Shoes (album), album based on the song
  - The Christmas Shoes (novel), a 2002 novelization of the song
  - The Christmas Shoes (film), a 2002 TV movie adaptation
