= Just Another Day in Paradise =

Studio album by Bertie Higgins
- Released: 1982
- Recorded: January–November 1981
- Studios: Pyramid "Eye" Recording Studio (Lookout Mountain, Georgia); Southern Tracks Recording Studio (Atlanta, Georgia)
- Genres: Tropical rock; soft rock
- Length: 40:52
- Label: Kat Family/Epic
- Producers: Sonny Limbo; Scott MacLellan

Bertie Higgins chronology
Just Another Day in Paradise (1982)	Pirates and Poets (1983)

Professional ratings
Review scores
Source	Rating
AllMusic	4/5 stars

Just Another Day in Paradise is the debut album by American singer-songwriter Bertie Higgins, released in 1982.

Singles from the album include the title track, the Top 10 single "Key Largo" and "Casablanca", both tributes to Humphrey Bogart films.

"Casablanca" was covered by Japanese singer Hiromi Go in the same year and reached No. 2 on the Japanese chart. Higgins' original version and album also achieved commercial success, and was the second best-selling album of 1982 by a Western artist in Japan's official hit parade, Oricon.

== Track listing ==
All songs written by Bertie Higgins, except where noted.

No.	Title	Writer(s)	Length
1.	"Just Another Day in Paradise"	Higgins, Sonny Limbo, Columbia Jones	3:56
2.	"Casablanca"	Higgins, Limbo, John Healy	4:34
3.	"Candledancer"		3:48
4.	"Key Largo"	Higgins, Limbo	3:20
5.	"Port O' Call (Savannah '55)"		3:26
6.	"White Line Fever"	Higgins, Limbo	3:59
7.	"The Heart Is the Hunter"		3:27
8.	"She's Gone to Live on the Mountain"		3:26
9.	"Down at the Blue Moon"		3:57
10.	"The Tropics"	Higgins, Limbo	7:00

== Personnel ==
Musicians

- Bertie Higgins – vocals, backing vocals, acoustic guitar, finger cymbals (4)
- John Healy – keyboards, grand piano, backing vocals
- Steve Nathan – keyboards, grand piano, organ
- Ken Bell – acoustic guitars, electric guitars
- Shelton Irwin – acoustic guitars, electric guitars
- Barry Richmond – electric guitars
- Jeff Pinkham – acoustic guitars, mandolin
- Norman Blake – additional mandolin
- Gary Baker – bass
- Arch Pearson – bass
- Owen Hale – drums
- Bill Marshall – drums
- Mickey Buckins – congas, percussion
- Edward Higgins – congas, percussion
- Ed Leamon – saxophones
- Scott MacLellan – flute, backing vocals
- Linda Penny Baker – oboe
- Gloria Higgins-Burke – backing vocals
- Doug Johnson – backing vocals
- Mann & Phyllis Loiacono – backing vocals
- Lu Moss – backing vocals
- David Powell – backing vocals
- Suzi Smith – backing vocals
- Mike Sullivan – backing vocals
- Cheryl Wilson – backing vocals

The Atlanta Strings

- Wayne Mosley – string arrangements and conductor
- Nan Maddox and Dona Vellek Klein – cello
- Robert Jones and Marion Kent – viola
- Lorentz Ottzen, Benjamin Picone, Patricio Salvatierra, Bradley Stewart and Frank Walton – violin

=== Production ===
- Sonny Limbo – producer, additional engineer
- Scott MacLellan – producer, additional engineer
- Doug Johnson – engineer
- Jim Stabile – additional engineer
- M.C. Ratner – mastering at CBS Studios Nashville (Nashville, Tennessee)
- Bertie Higgins – cover concept
- Mike McCarty – cover concept, cover artwork, design
- Rick Mullins – set design
- Joe Kahl – photography
- Dawn Carr – hand lettering
- Kat Family Management – management
- TTI Management – management
- Columbia Jones – management

== Charts ==
=== Album ===
Chart (1982)	Peak position
Australia (Kent Music Report)	32
Japan Weekly Albums (Oricon)	4
US Billboard 200	38

=== Singles ===
Year	Country	Chart	Single	Position
1982	United States	Billboard Hot 100	"Key Largo"	8
1982	United States	Billboard AC	"Key Largo"	1
1982	United States	Billboard Country	"Key Largo"	50
1982	Australia	Kent Music Report	"Key Largo"	2
1982	United States	Billboard Hot 100	"Just Another Day in Paradise"	46
1982	United States	Billboard AC	"Just Another Day in Paradise"	10
1982	United States	Billboard Country	"Just Another Day in Paradise"	90
1982	Japan	Oricon Weekly	"Casablanca"	13

== Certifications ==
Region	Certification	Certified units/sales
Hong Kong (IFPI Hong Kong)	Gold	10,000^{*}
^{*} Sales figures based on certification alone.
