= 3 of Hearts (album) =

Self-titled debut studio album by American group 3 of Hearts

Studio album by 3 of Hearts
- Released: July 24, 2001
- Recorded: 2001
- Studios: Ocean Way, Nashville
- Genres: Country music; teen pop
- Length: 41:36
- Label: RCA Nashville
- Producer: Byron Gallimore (also exec.)

3 of Hearts chronology
3 of Hearts (2001)	Breaking All the Rules (2005)

Singles from 3 of Hearts
- 1. "Love Is Enough" Released: March 6, 2001; 2. "Arizona Rain" Released: July 23, 2001

3 of Hearts is the debut studio album by American girl group 3 of Hearts. It was released on July 24, 2001, through the record label RCA Nashville. 3 of Hearts is a teen pop and country music album, though according to some music critics, it leans more towards pop music. The album was managed by American producer Byron Gallimore; its marketing focused on the group's crossover appeal to target a teenaged and young-adult audience. 3 of Hearts performed on two national tours sponsored by Seventeen magazine and Walmart respectively, and the singers were featured in several marketing campaigns.

Reviews of 3 of Hearts were mixed; some critics praised the group's vocals and public image, but others criticized the songs as generic and lacking an authentic country sound. The album peaked at number 45 on Billboard's Top Country Albums chart. Two singles – "Love Is Enough" and "Arizona Rain" – were released and made appearances on the Country Airplay Billboard chart. The album's low sales and lack of appeal to country radio audiences led to RCA dropping the group.

== Background and recording ==
3 of Hearts members Blaire Stroud, Katie McNeill, and Deserea Wasdin first performed together at a funeral, where they sang the hymn "He Leadeth Me". They had each performed independently at various venues and aspired to pursue music as a career. At the suggestion of their family and friends, they recorded a demo tape and video. The tape was composed of four songs: cover versions of works by Shania Twain and Martina McBride, a gospel song, and "The Star-Spangled Banner". McNeill's mother sent the cassette to record promoter Peter Svendsen. While organizing unsolicited demos and materials, Svendsen's daughter recommended he should listen to the tape. Stroud, McNeil, and Wasdin received offers from four Nashville-based record labels, including RCA Nashville, with whom they signed their record deal shortly after graduating from high school.

RCA executive vice-president Butch Waugh said the record company was immediately drawn to the group because of their wholesome image and work ethic. Steve Hochman of Los Angeles Times associated 3 of Hearts with a trend towards younger country performers, connecting them with singers Jessica Andrews, LeAnn Rimes, and Lila McCann, and the band Marshall Dyllon. The record label marketed 3 of Hearts and their album to a younger listener; the group's manager Ken Kragen said that he hoped the group could revive interest in country music from a teenaged and young-adult audience, as the genre had fallen out of favor with these demographics. Kragen has said that before he signed the trio, he almost retired from music, after being fired by singer-songwriter Kenny Rogers. In 2001, Rogers sued Kragen for allegedly poaching 3 of Hearts and other musical acts from his company, Rogers' Dreamcatcher Management Co.; Kragen responded by saying Rogers' company had rejected 3 of Hearts. A settlement was reached in 2003, and the terms of the agreement were not disclosed to the public.

American producer Byron Gallimore worked as the executive producer for the group's debut album; in the later half of 2000, the trio recorded the songs in the Tennessee studios Essential Sound and Ocean Way Nashville. The music was mixed at the Emerald Sound Studios in Nashville, and mastered in Hollywood. Prior to the release of the album, 3 of Hearts' song "Just Might Change Your Life" was featured on the soundtrack for the film Where the Heart Is (2000).

== Composition and sound ==
"Sugar and Daisies"
A sample of 3 of Hearts' "Sugar and Daisies"; some critics noted the song for its "peppy" and "bouncy" composition.

3 of Hearts is a teen pop and country music album that consists of eleven tracks. The instrumentals include fiddles and drums, which Stephen Thomas Erlewine of AllMusic has noted are commonly used in country music. Malcolm Mayhew, writing for the Fort Worth Star-Telegram, identified the trio's sound as "country sprinkled with pop". He wrote that the album has a focus on a style of country music similar to that of American band the Dixie Chicks, with "pop touches" and "an occasional nod to Latin". Several music critics said that 3 of Hearts features more pop compositions than country ones; a writer for Billboard wrote: "even with the most loose, liberal translation, no way is this anything close to country music." The same writer noted that the trio's music and style did not fit with the more "edgy" scene of their home state Texas.

Songs include "peppy-squared, nearly interchangeable midtempos" ("Love Is Enough," "It Happened to Me", "The Hard Way", and "Sugar and Daisies") and "note-bending, Boyz II Men-style ballads" ("6, 8, 12", "Wash Away This Kiss", and "Over the Edge"). The album's opening track – the uptempo "Love Is Enough" – features lyrics about the importance of love, and an instrumental provided by a fiddle. The subject of romance is also explored in "Baby, That's The Way" – which interprets true love through the message, "you'll know it's the real thing when you see it" – and "Sugar and Daisies". "6, 8, 12" is a cover of American singer Brian McKnight's 2000 single of the same name.

== Release and promotion ==
3 of Hearts was initially scheduled for release on June 5, 2001, but was pushed back to July 24 of that year. It was released as an audio CD, cassette, and digital download. Jon Elliot, a senior director of marketing and artist development for RCA, said the promotional strategies for the album and the group focused primarily on "get[ting] their names out there and their faces visible". 3 of Hearts performed as part of a 2001 tour sponsored by Seventeen magazine, in which they sang in American shopping malls in 50 cities as part of a showcase of prom fashions. They also participated in the Walmart Across America Tour. To prepare for the tours, the trio were given dance lessons by American singer and choreographer Toni Basil. Lorie Hollabaugh of Billboard praised the group's live performances as defined by "tightly woven harmonies".

Along with the performances, the group members were featured in magazine advertisements from April to July 2001; the features included a contest in which a reader could win a performance from the group at their school. 3 of Hearts was the first country act to partner with Seventeen. The group also participated in a marketing campaign with Gillette, and discussions started with Warner TV on a potential television series based on their lives. To further promote their music, 3 of Hearts visited radio stations. They also had a two-hour interview with Scholastic magazine and appeared on the cover. They were also prominently featured on boxes of Kellogg's cereal; Chet Flippo of CMT described the promotion of 3 of Hearts as "a media blitz".

3 of Hearts peaked at number 45 on the Top Country Albums Billboard chart on August 11, 2001, remaining on the chart for six weeks. Following the album's release, 3 of Hearts was let go from RCA due to low sales and a lack of connection with the core audience of country radio – the middle-aged woman. In a 2002 interview, RCA chairman Joe Galante said he learned to "aim for your natural marketplace" from his experiences with 3 of Hearts and he felt marketing a country act for teenagers was not a wise business move.

=== Singles ===
"Love Is Enough" was released as the lead single from 3 of Hearts; it was sent to radio stations in the United States on March 6, 2001. It was further promoted through an "enhanced commercial CD single", which included the accompanying music video for the song. The group performed "Love Is Enough" on The Jenny Jones Show as part of "nine young acts to watch in 2001". Deborah Evans Price of Billboard praised the single as conveying a "vibrant feel that evokes a sunny day with the windows down and the radio up", but found the lyrics and overall message to be cliché. "Arizona Rain" was released as the album's second single on July 23, 2001. The track was featured on the 2001 album Country Heat 2002, which was made available through BMG Music Canada.

"Love Is Enough" and "Arizona Rain" both made appearances on Billboard. "Love Is Enough" peaked at number 43 on the Country Airplay chart on May 19, 2001; the single remained on the chart for ten weeks. "Arizona Rain" reached number 59 on the Country Airplay chart on August 18, 2001, and remained on the chart for a week.

== Critical reception ==
3 of Hearts' vocals and image received praise from music critics following the album's release. Billboard described the trio as "possess[ing] angelic voices" and praised 3 of Hearts as "ear candy". D Magazine said the album's pop composition could allow the group to have a crossover appeal, and compared them to the Dixie Chicks. Stephen Thomas Erlewine praised the album as well-constructed and appealing, but criticized several songs – specifically "Over the Edge" – as sounding dated. He positively compared the trio's vocals to those of American band Rascal Flatts, and preferred their wholesome image over the more sexualized one attached to American singer Willa Ford. In a mixed review, Mario Tarradell of the Knight Ridder Tribune described the music as "breezy" and "refreshing", but noted that it was not innovative.

Commentators criticized 3 of Hearts and the trio's vocals as generic and lacking an authentic country sound. Country Standard Time's Dan MacIntosh called the album manufactured, describing its content as "impersonal, yet functional, songs". He responded negatively to the lack of attitude in the group's voices, which he dismissed as "girlishly giddy vocals and pop-ish country backing". Editor Tom Roland, writing for the American Bar Association, panned the album's content for its "bright, but shallow declarations of puppy love". Even though he praised the trio as talented, he said their vocals had "none of the life experience that has been a traditional hallmark of country recordings". (Note: Tom Roland included his review of 3 of Hearts within a larger article on record labels' attempts to market country music towards a younger and more diverse audience.)

== Track listing ==
Writing and production credits for the songs are taken from the booklet of 3 of Hearts. Byron Gallimore produced all of the songs for the album.

No.	Title	Writer(s)	Length
1.	"Love Is Enough"	Neil Thrasher, Jim Varsos	3:32
2.	"It Happened to Me"	Ken Harrell, Greg Johnson, Shaye Smith	3:35
3.	"6, 8, 12"	Brian McKnight, Brandon Barnes	4:13
4.	"Over the Edge"	Jason Blume, Jim Petra Cooper	3:21
5.	"Sugar and Daisies"	Brett James, Holly Lamar	3:47
6.	"Arizona Rain"	Victoria Banks	3:51
7.	"The Hard Way"	John Michaels, Mark Hammond, Brian Nash	3:43
8.	"Wash Away This Kiss"	Rob Heath, Don Goodman, Rick Perry	3:53
9.	"You Break Me"	James, Troy Verges	3:47
10.	"Is It Love"	Max Martin, Jörgen Elofsson	3:43
11.	"Baby, That's the Way"	Gayla Borders, Jeff Borders	4:03
Total length:			41:36

== Credits and personnel ==
The following credits were adapted from the booklet of 3 of Hearts and AllMusic:

Management

- BMG Entertainment

Recording locations

- Music recording – Ocean Way Nashville (Nashville)
- Mixing – Emerald Sound Studios (Nashville)
- Mastering – The Mastering Lab (Hollywood)

Credits

- Jeff Balding – mixing
- Mike Brignardello – bass guitar
- Clint Brown – engineer
- David Bryant – assistant engineer
- Ann Callis – production coordination
- Ricky Cobble – engineer
- Daniel Davis – engineer
- Andrew Eccles – photography
- Greg Fogie – assistant engineer
- Paul Franklin – steel guitar
- Byron Gallimore – electric guitar, slide guitar, electric sitar, executive producer
- Jed Hackett – mixing
- Aubrey Haynie – fiddle, guest artist
- Jeff King – electric guitar
- Julian King – engineer
- B. James Lowry – acoustic guitar, electric guitar
- Erik Lutkins – engineer
- Brent Mason – electric guitar
- Terry McMillan – harmonica
- Steve Nathan – keyboard
- Doug Sax – mastering
- Trish Townsend – stylist
- Biff Watson – acoustic guitar
- Lonnie Wilson – drums, percussion

== Charts ==
Chart (2001)	Peak position
US Top Country Albums (Billboard)	45

== Release history ==
Country	Date	Format	Label	Ref.
United States	July 24, 2001	cassette; CD; digital download	RCA Nashville	
