= List of Billboard Adult Contemporary number ones of 2001 =

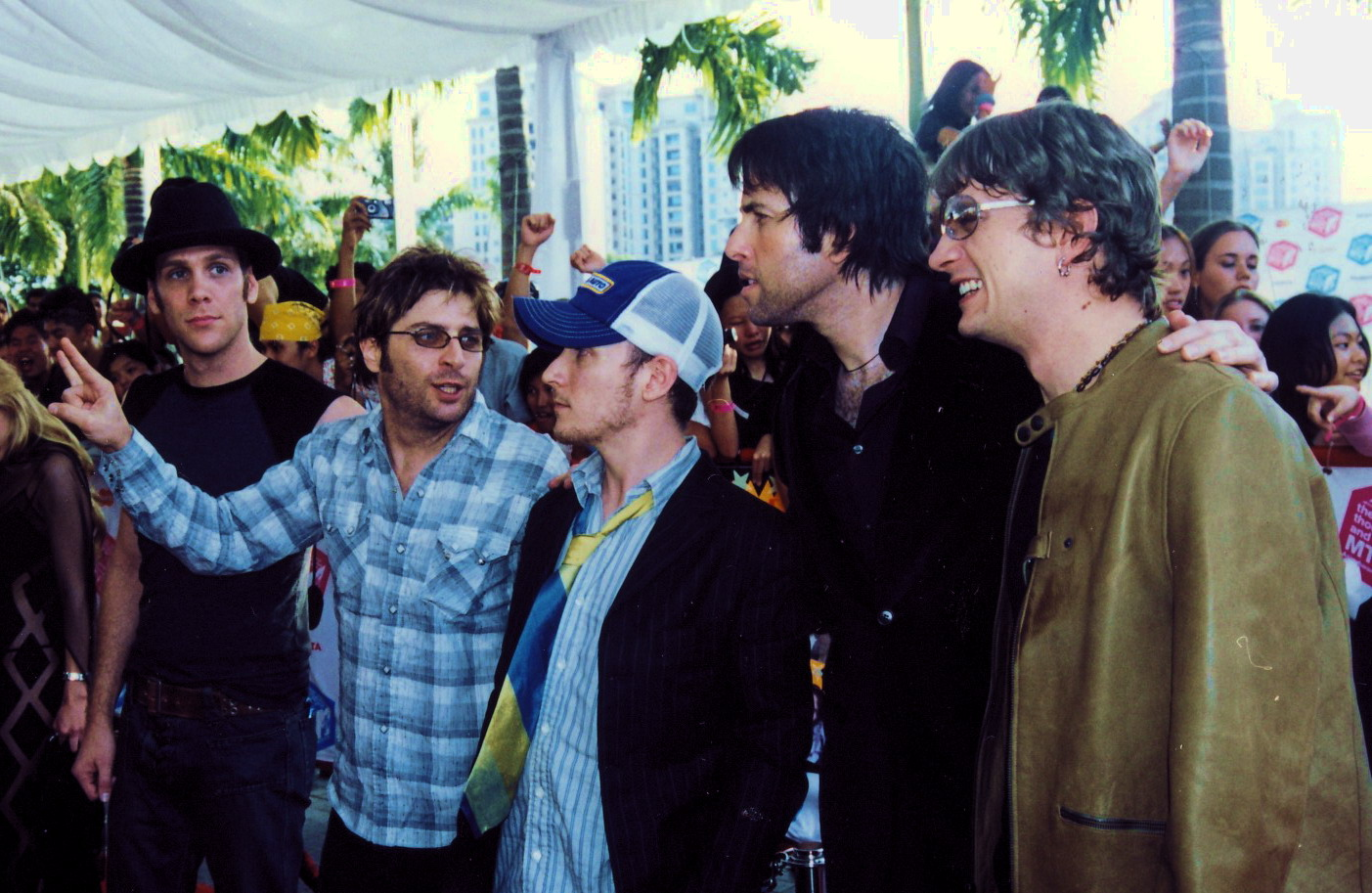
"If You're Gone" was a number one for Matchbox Twenty.

Adult Contemporary is a chart published by Billboard ranking the top-performing songs in the United States in the adult contemporary music (AC) market. In 2001, eight different songs topped the chart in 52 issues of the magazine, based on weekly airplay data from radio stations compiled by Nielsen Broadcast Data Systems.

In the year's first issue of Billboard, the number one song was "The Christmas Shoes" by the contemporary Christian music group NewSong, which moved into the top spot that week. The song spawned a novelization, which in turn was made into a made-for-television film of the same name in 2002, but has been included on lists of the worst Christmas songs of all time. After a single week in the top spot, "The Christmas Shoes" was replaced at number one by "This I Promise You" by NSYNC, which spent eleven consecutive weeks at number one after topping the chart for the first time for the last week of 2000. After being displaced from the top spot in the issue dated March 31, it returned to number one for a further week, giving it a final total of thirteen weeks in the top spot (twelve of them in 2001). This placed it in a tie for the highest total number of weeks spent at number one during 2001 with "There You'll Be" by Faith Hill, a song from the soundtrack of the film Pearl Harbor, which also spent twelve non-consecutive weeks at number one. With the exception of "The Christmas Shoes", all of 2001's number ones had multiple runs atop the chart, including the British singer Dido's "Thank You", which reached the top spot on four occasions, but spent only a single week at number one each time.

In the last quarter of the year, two songs that came to be associated with coverage of the September 11 attacks topped the chart. The first was "Only Time" by Irish musician Enya, which reached the top spot in the issue of Billboard dated September 29. The song, originally released in 2000, was used in a video paying tribute to the victims of the attacks that went viral on the internet and was featured on television, and it went on to spend six non-consecutive weeks atop the AC chart. It was replaced at number one in early December by "Hero" by Enrique Iglesias, another song that came to be associated with the aftermath of the attacks. The song, which Iglesias performed on the America: A Tribute to Heroes telethon on September 21, and which became ubiquitous in the weeks after the attacks as what MTV later called an "impromptu anthem of healing", held the top spot for the final four weeks of the year.

== Chart history ==
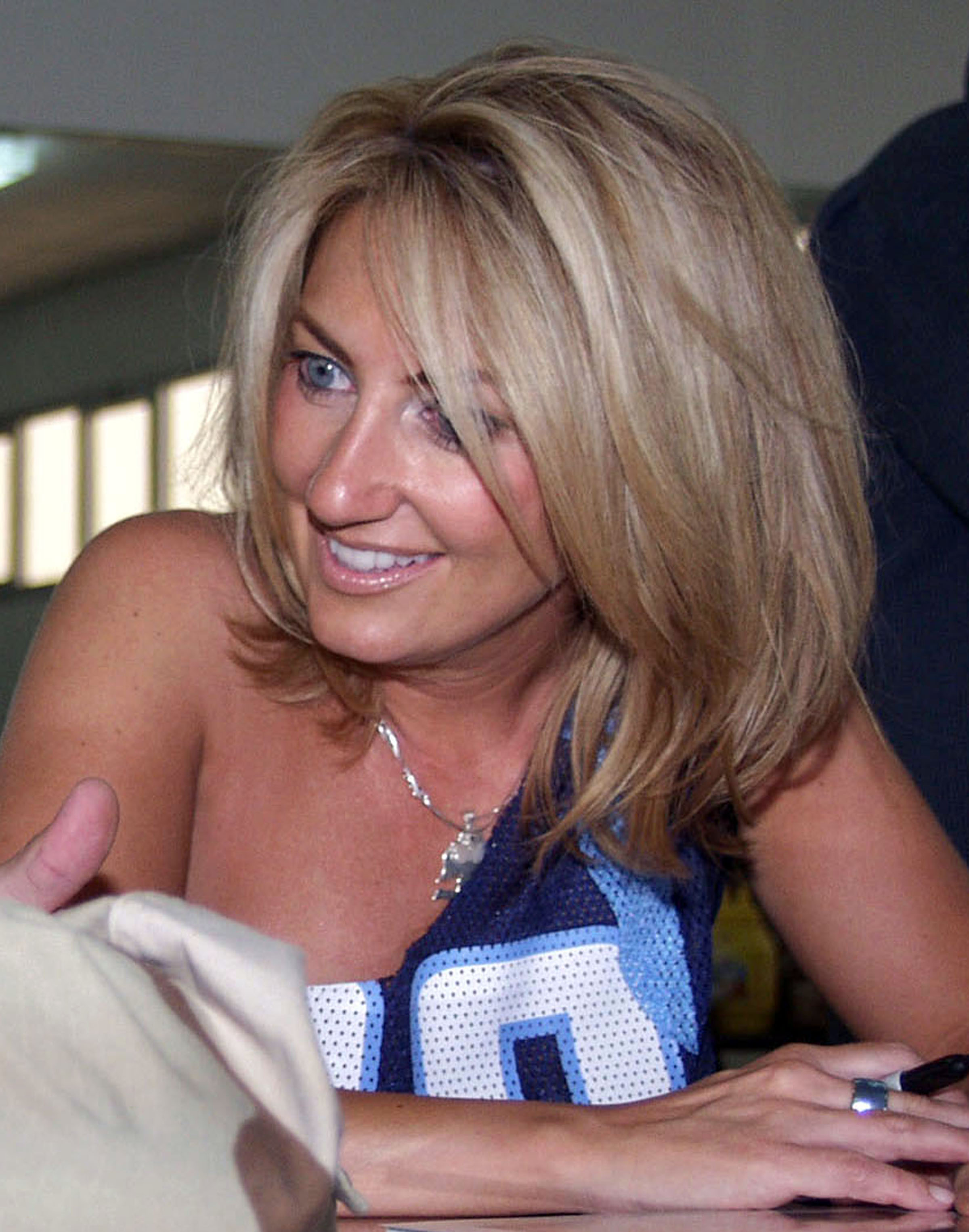
Lee Ann Womack's "I Hope You Dance" spent a total of eleven weeks at number one.

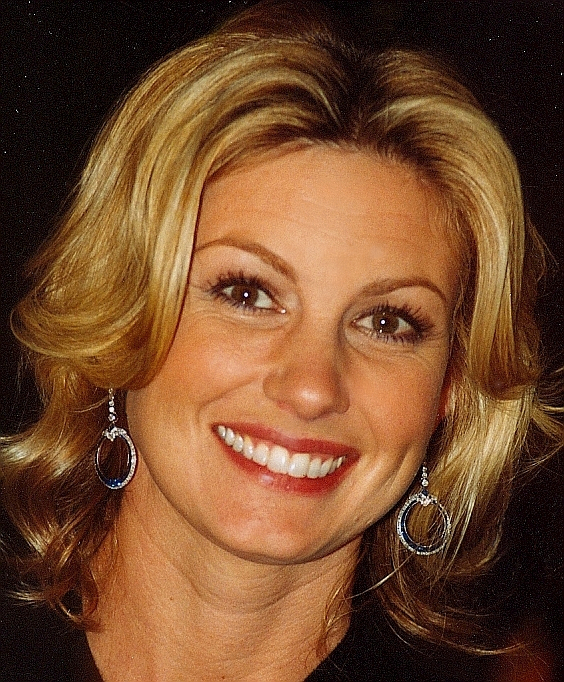
Faith Hill spent twelve weeks atop the chart with "There You'll Be".

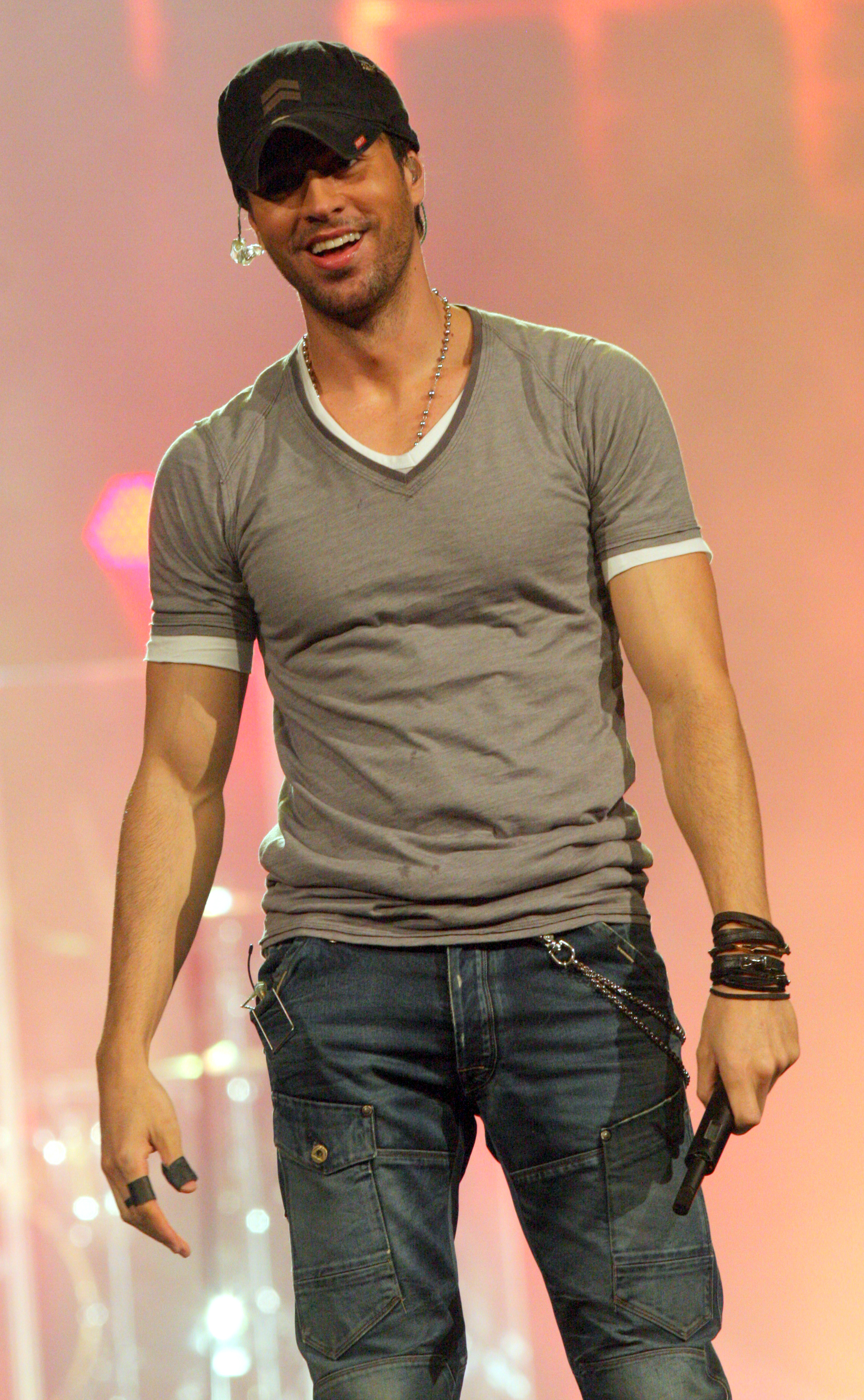
Enrique Iglesias ended the year at number one with his song "Hero".

Chart history
Issue date	Title	Artist(s)	Ref.
January 6	"The Christmas Shoes"	NewSong	
January 13	"This I Promise You"	NSYNC	
January 20	"This I Promise You"	NSYNC	
January 27	"This I Promise You"	NSYNC	
February 3	"This I Promise You"	NSYNC	
February 10	"This I Promise You"	NSYNC	
February 17	"This I Promise You"	NSYNC	
February 24	"This I Promise You"	NSYNC	
March 3	"This I Promise You"	NSYNC	
March 10	"This I Promise You"	NSYNC	
March 17	"This I Promise You"	NSYNC	
March 24	"This I Promise You"	NSYNC	
March 31	"I Hope You Dance"	Lee Ann Womack	
April 7	"This I Promise You"	NSYNC	
April 14	"I Hope You Dance"	Lee Ann Womack	
April 21	"I Hope You Dance"	Lee Ann Womack	
April 28	"I Hope You Dance"	Lee Ann Womack	
May 5	"I Hope You Dance"	Lee Ann Womack	
May 12	"I Hope You Dance"	Lee Ann Womack	
May 19	"I Hope You Dance"	Lee Ann Womack	
May 26	"I Hope You Dance"	Lee Ann Womack	
June 2	"I Hope You Dance"	Lee Ann Womack	
June 9	"I Hope You Dance"	Lee Ann Womack	
June 16	"Thank You"	Dido	
June 23	"I Hope You Dance"	Lee Ann Womack	
June 30	"Thank You"	Dido	
July 7	"There You'll Be"	Faith Hill	
July 14	"Thank You"	Dido	
July 21	"There You'll Be"	Faith Hill	
July 28	"There You'll Be"	Faith Hill	
August 4	"There You'll Be"	Faith Hill	
August 11	"There You'll Be"	Faith Hill	
August 18	"There You'll Be"	Faith Hill	
August 25	"There You'll Be"	Faith Hill	
September 1	"Thank You"	Dido	
September 8	"There You'll Be"	Faith Hill	
September 15	"There You'll Be"	Faith Hill	
September 22	"There You'll Be"	Faith Hill	
September 29	"Only Time"	Enya	
October 6	"If You're Gone"	Matchbox Twenty	
October 13	"There You'll Be"	Faith Hill	
October 20	"There You'll Be"	Faith Hill	
October 27	"Only Time"	Enya	
November 3	"If You're Gone"	Matchbox Twenty	
November 10	"Only Time"	Enya	
November 17	"Only Time"	Enya	
November 24	"Only Time"	Enya	
December 1	"Only Time"	Enya	
December 8	"Hero"	Enrique Iglesias	
December 15	"Hero"	Enrique Iglesias	
December 22	"Hero"	Enrique Iglesias	
December 29	"Hero"	Enrique Iglesias	

== See also ==
- 2001 in music
- List of artists who reached number one on the U.S. Adult Contemporary chart
