= I Knew I Loved You (disambiguation) =

"I Knew I Loved You" is a 1999 song by Savage Garden.

I Knew I Loved You may also refer to:

- "I Knew I Loved You" (Celine Dion song) (2007)
- "I Knew I Loved You", a 1999 song by Ty England from Highways & Dance Halls
