= We Don't Live Here, We Just Love Here =

Song by Big Ben Atkins
- A-side: "We Don't Live Here, We Just Love Here"
- B-side: "Baby Blue Eyes"
- Published: 1977
- Released: 1978
- Genre: Country
- Length: 3:22
- Songwriter(s): Mickey Buckins
- Producer(s): Sonny Limbo & Mickey Buckins

United States chronology
"There'll Never Be Another For Me" (1976)	"We Don't Live Here, We Just Love Here" (1978)	"I Don't Want To Lose" (1983)

"We Don't Live Here, We Just Love Here" was a 1978 single for Big Ben Atkins. It was also a hit for him that year, registering on the Cash Box, Billboard and Record World charts.

== Background ==
"We Don't Live Here, We Just Love Here" was composed by Mickey Buckins and copyright registered in October, 1977. It was recorded by Big Ben Atkins The recording session was produced by Sonny Limbo & Mickey Buckins with Nelson Larkin as the executive producer. Backed with the Menter Williams & Dan Penn song "Baby Blue Eyes", it was released as a single on GRT 161. It would prove to be a success for him that year.

When the record was charting on the Billboard Hot Country Singles chart, it was one of the Star Performers from its debut on May 13, though to the following week (May 20), which was one of the Singles registering greatest proportionate upward progress on that week.

Big Ben Atkins was actually a white soul singer who was once signed to the Stax label. He was actually the first white artist who was signed to Stax.

== Reception ==
"We Don't Live Here, We Just Love Here" was one of The Top Single Picks in the Country section of the May 6 issue of Billboard.

In Canada, as per RPM Weekly (July 1 issue), Al Saville of CFFM-FM in Kamloops had the song as a hit pick.

== Airplay ==
On the week of May 6, Marie Ratliff reported in her Record World Country Hotline column that a Newcomer Big Ben Atkins was doing well on stations, WPNX, WBAM, WJQS, KVOO and KSOP. She reported the following week that the song was now one of the most added chart contenders.

The May 19 issue of The Gavin Report showed that the single was being played on Larry James's show at WBT in Charlotte, North Carolina. It had also been seeing action on Billy Parker's show at KVOO in Tulsa.

== Chart ==
The single debuted at no. 84 on the Billboard Hot Country Singles chart on the week ending, May 13, 1978. It peaked at no. 72 on week four for the week ending June 3.

"We Don't Live Here, We Just Love Here" debuted at no. 99 in the Cash Box, Top 100 Country chart on the week of May 13, 1978. At week four on the week of June 3, it peaked at no. 81.

On the week of May 20, 1977, "We Don't Live Here, We Just Love Here" made its debut at no. 89 on the Record World Country Singles Chart. It peaked at no. 80 on the week of June 10 and held that position for another week. IT spent a total of five weeks in the chart.

=== Chart summary ===
Publication	Chart	Peak	Duration
Billboard	Hot Country Singles	72	4 wks
Cash Box	Top 100 Country	81	4 wks
Record World	Country Singles	80	5 wks
