= Key Largo (song) =

- Side A of US single

Single by Bertie Higgins

from the album Just Another Day in Paradise
- B-side: "White Line Fever"
- Released: September 1981
- Recorded: 1981
- Genre: Soft rock; tropical rock; adult contemporary; country
- Length: 3:20; 3:05 (7")
- Label: Kat Family; Epic
- Songwriters: Bertie Higgins; Sonny Limbo
- Producers: Sonny Limbo; Scott MacLellan

Bertie Higgins singles chronology
"Key Largo" (1981)	"Just Another Day in Paradise" (1982)

Music video
- "Key Largo" on YouTube

"Key Largo" is the debut single by American singer-songwriter Bertie Higgins, released in September 1981. In early 1982, it became Higgins' only top 40 hit in the United States, peaking at No. 8 on the Billboard Hot 100 chart. The track spent 17 weeks in the top 40 and was certified gold by the RIAA. In addition, "Key Largo" topped the Adult Contemporary chart for two weeks. In Australia and Canada, the song reached the top three, peaking at No. 2 and No. 3, respectively. In 2009, VH1 ranked "Key Largo" No. 75 on its 100 Greatest One-Hit Wonders of the '80s program.

== Background and content ==
The song's lyrics plead with a lover to reconsider ending a romance. The singer recalls their first winter together, when they lived in a poorly heated place. Their only entertainment was watching the "Late, Late Show," which featured films such as Casablanca and Key Largo, the latter of which starred Humphrey Bogart and Lauren Bacall. Bacall does not appear in Casablanca. The couple is recalled in the lyric, We had it all / Just like Bogie and Bacall / Starring in our own late, late show / Sailin' away to Key Largo. The lyrics also draw from the film Casablanca, including the lines, "Here's looking at you, kid," and "Please say you will / Play it again." The song "Key Largo" was included on Higgins' album Just Another Day in Paradise.

== Music video ==
A promotional music video was produced in 1982, filmed in and around Tarpon Springs, Florida, and directed by David Jean Schweitzer. It begins with Higgins leaning against a pole, smoking a cigarette, reminiscing. Later, the singer walks with a young woman, played by then-17-year-old Patty Wolfe. The scene then cuts to the pair riding in a motorboat around Anclote Key, off Tarpon Springs. The video also shows them in a car at Fred Howard Park. The final moments depict the two walking along a beach at sunset.

== Charts ==
=== Weekly charts ===
Chart (1981–1982)	Peak position
Australia (Kent Music Report)	2
Canadian RPM Top Singles	3
Canadian RPM Adult Contemporary Tracks	1
Ireland (IRMA)	6
New Zealand (Recorded Music NZ)	8
South Africa (Springbok)	18
UK Singles Chart	60
US Billboard Adult Contemporary Tracks	1
US Billboard Hot Country Singles	50
US Billboard Hot 100	8
US Cash Box Top 100	7

=== Year-end charts ===
Chart (1982)	Rank
Australia (Kent Music Report)	5
Canada RPM Top Singles	29
US Billboard Hot 100	17
US Cash Box	41

== Certifications and sales ==
Region	Certification	Certified units/sales
Australia (ARIA)	Gold	50,000^{^}
^{^} Shipments figures based on certification alone.

== See also ==
- List of Billboard Adult Contemporary number ones of 1982
