= Eddie Middleton =

- Born: April 15, 1947; Moultrie, Georgia, United States
- Died: August 21, 2021 (aged 74) Marietta, Georgia
- Occupation: Singer
- Labels: Epic, Cleveland International, SSS International, Waffle Records
- Formerly of: Seros, R. C. and the Moonpies, Down Home, King David and the Slaves, NewSong, In-Men Ltd.

Eddie Middleton (April 15, 1947 – August 21, 2021) was an American singer who had a few hits on the US country charts in the 1970s. He also leant towards the soul genre and sang gospel. His biggest success was his version of the song "Endlessly".

== Background ==
Middleton had three records charting nationally on the country charts in 1977. They were "Midnight Train to Georgia", "Endlessly" and "What Kind of Fool (Do You Think I Am)".

Middleton was a founding member of the Christian supergroup NewSong.

== Career ==
=== 1960s ===
In 1967 and having enrolled at Valdosta State College, Eddie Middleton formed a band and was also in groups such as Seros, R. C. and the Moonpies, Down Home and for a brief period was in a blue eyed soul band from Jesup, Georgia called King David and the Slaves. In the late 1960s, Middleton was performing with a band called R.C. & The Moonpies which was made up of mainly students from Valdosta State College. Mike Hattaway who was the drummer for the band would later recall that Middleton had an ability to cover soul and beach tunes.

=== 1970s ===
Eddie Middleton recorded the song "Until Then" which was composed by Dot Hester. Backed with "Circus City" it was released on SSS International SSS-801 in 1970.

"Midnight Train to Georgia"

On the week of June 4, 1977, Cash Box showed that "Midnight Train to Georgia" was being played on WHK in Cleveland where it had gone to no 36, was on the playlist of WBAM in Montgomery, and on the playlist of WWVA in Wheeling. On the week of June 11, it debuted at no. 93 in the Cash Box Top 100 Country chart. It had also gone from 36 to 26 on the play chart on WHK in Cleveland. On the week of July 2, 1977, Cash Box showed that it had gone from 30 to 24 on the playlist of WSLR in Akron, and was on the playlists of WDEE in Detroit and KKYX in San Antonio. And that week, having been in the Cash Box Top 100 Country chart for four weeks, it peaked at no. 84.

Further activities

It was reported by Billboard in the mnagazine's September 10 issue that Cleveland International artist Eddie Middleton, Columbia artist R. C. Bannon and The Silver City Band were part of a recent CBS Records showcase that was held at Nashville's Exit Inn.

"Endlessly"

Middleton recorded the Clyde Otis composition "Endlessly" which was produced by Sonny Limbo and Mickey Buckins. It was released on an Epic / Cleveland International promo (cat#8-50431). It was in the recommended section of Billboard's Top Single Picks in issue September 3, 1077. The single debuted at no. 89 in the Billboard Hot Country Singles chart on the week of September 10. The song peaked at no 38 on the week of October 22 and held that position for another week.

Further activities

Middleton's album, Eddie Middleton which was recorded in Atlanta was reviewed in the October 22 issue of Billboard. It was also one of the Top Album Picks. The reviewer said that it carried the hot Atlanta sound and was typified by the busy production. The prominent background voices were also noted. The best tracks were "Midnight Train To Georgia", "Don't Say Let's Wait", "Endlessly," "All for the Love of a Girl" and "Born to Lose.

In 1989, a single that Middleton recorded for Waffle Records, "Good Food Fast" bw "Waffle Doo-Wop" which was composed and produced by Jerry Buckner and Mary Welch Rogers was released.

== Career (later years) ==
In 2005, Middleton was a member of a later version of the group, The In-Men Ltd., a group that was around in the late 1960s.

His early recording "Fifth of Soul" was included on the Soul Party - Sun Records various artists compilation that was released in 2012.

According to the October 13, 2018 issue of the Valdosta Daily Times, Middleton was scheduled to give a concert at the Lake Park United Methodist Church in South Georgia on Sunday, October 21 at 6:30 pm..

== Death ==
Eddie Middleton died on August 21, 2021, reportedly related to complications related to multiple infections including COVID-19.
