= Should've Asked Her Faster =

Single by Ty England

from the album Ty England
- Released: May 29, 1995
- Genre: Country
- Length: 2:43
- Label: RCA Nashville
- Songwriters: Al Anderson, Bob DiPiero, Joe Klimek
- Producer: Garth Fundis

Ty England singles chronology
"Should've Asked Her Faster" (1995)	"Smoke in Her Eyes" (1995)

"Should've Asked Her Faster" is a debut song written by Bob DiPiero, Al Anderson and Joe Klimek, and recorded by American country music artist Ty England. It was released in May 1995 as the lead single from the eponymous Ty England album.

== Chart performance ==
"Should've Asked Her Faster" debuted at number 69 on the U.S. Billboard Hot Country Singles & Tracks for the week of June 10, 1995.

Chart (1995)	Peak position
Canada Country Singles (RPM)	2
US Bubbling Under Hot 100 (Billboard)	21
US Hot Country Songs (Billboard)	3

=== Year-end charts ===
Chart (1995)	Position
Canada Country Tracks (RPM)	14
US Country Songs (Billboard)	45

== Other versions ==
England re-recorded the song on his 1999 album Highways & Dance Halls as Tyler England, featuring Steve Wariner on lead guitar.
