= Sonny Limbo =

American record producer, arranger, and composer (1943–1992)

- Born: Robert Ladale Limbaugh; April 13, 1943
- Origin: United States
- Died: December 27, 1992 (aged 49)
- Occupations: musician, composer, producer
- Formerly of: The Sonny Limbo Superband
- Spouse: Frances Mullins

Sonny Limbo, born Robert Limbaugh (1943–1992), was an American record producer, arranger and composer. His production credits include, "I Wanna Come Over" for Alabama, "Tell Me a Lie" for Sami Jo, and albums, Just Another Day in Paradise for Bertie Higgins and Live It Up! for Holly Woods.

== Background ==
His hit compositions include, "God Loves Us (When We All Sing Together)" by Sami Jo, "What If (I Said I Love You)" by Unipop, "Backstreet Ballet" by Savannah, and "Key Largo", "Just Another Day in Paradise", "When You Fall in Love" and "Homeless People" by Bertie Higgins.

Together with Mickey Buckins, Limbo produced the self-titled album for Eddie Middleton who was discovered by A&R man, Steve Popovich. The album was recorded at Bill Lowery's Lowery Studio. It was released in 1977.

He has played a role in the development of the careers of several artists, including the group Alabama.

Limbo has also worked with Cissy Houston.

== Career ==
Working with Mickey Buckins, Limbo produced "Crystal Blue Persuasion" for the group, The Naturals, a Shout Records act. It was reviewed in the January 4, 1975, issue of Record World. The magazine had it as a sleeper. The reviewer said that this particular recording seemed to be more resilient and persuasive than the original.

Working with Buckins, they produced "God Loves Us (When We All Sing Together)" for Sami Jo & Friends. The record made its debut at no. 96 in the Record World Country Singles Chart on the week of May 1, 1976. It peaked at no. 79 on the week of May 22 and held the position for another week.

Limbo and Mickey Buckins produced the song "We Don't Live Here, We Just Love Here", which was composed by Buckins and copyright registered in October, 1977. It was recorded by Big Ben Atkins. In addition to Limbo's and Buckins' production roles, Nelson Larkin was the executive producer. The song was backed with a Mentor Williams & Dan Penn composition "Baby Blue Eyes". Tt was released as a single on GRT 161 in 1978. It would prove to be a success for Atkins that year.

In 1980, Bertie Higgins moved to Atlanta. There he came into contact with Sonny Limbo. Limbo set up a meeting between Higgins and music publisher, Bill Lowery. Limbo co-produced Bertie Higgins' Just Another Day In Paradise album which was released in 1982. He was also one of the engineers. He co-wrote seven of the ten songs on the album.
