= Ty England (album) =

Studio album by Ty England
- Released: August 15, 1995
- Genre: Country
- Length: 32:25
- Label: RCA Nashville
- Producer: Garth Fundis

Ty England chronology
Ty England (1995)	Two Ways to Fall (1996)

Singles from Ty England
- 1. "Should've Asked Her Faster" Released: May 29, 1995; 2. "Smoke in Her Eyes" Released: October 1995; 3. "Redneck Son" Released: February 1996

Professional ratings
Review scores
Source	Rating
AllMusic	4.5/5 stars
Entertainment Weekly	A

Ty England is the debut album by American country music artist Ty England. Formerly a guitarist in Garth Brooks' road band, England recorded and released his solo debut album in 1995 on the Nashville division of RCA Records. The album's first single, "Should've Asked Her Faster", peaked at number 3 on the Billboard Hot Country Singles & Tracks (now Hot Country Songs) charts; the second and third singles ("Smoke in Her Eyes" and "Redneck Son", respectively) both failed to make Top 40 on the same chart. "Her Only Bad Habit Is Me" was originally recorded by George Strait on his 1991 album Chill of an Early Fall.

== Track listing ==
No.	Title	Writer(s)	Length
1.	"Redneck Son"	Bob Carlisle, Randy Thomas	3:23
2.	"Smoke in Her Eyes"	Hugh Prestwood	3:26
3.	"Should've Asked Her Faster"	Al Anderson, Bob DiPiero, Joe Klimek	2:43
4.	"Her Only Bad Habit Is Me"	Don Cook, Harlan Howard	3:19
5.	"You'll Find Somebody New"	Aaron Barker, Dean Dillon	2:52
6.	"A Swing Like That"	Billy Lavelle, L. David Lewis	2:19
7.	"New Faces in the Fields"	Harley Allen, Denise Draper, Steve Hood	3:58
8.	"The Blues Ain't News to Me"	Wayland Holyfield, Verlon Thompson	3:24
9.	"It's Lonesome Everywhere"	Thompson, Reese Wilson, Billy Spencer	3:07
10.	"Is That You"	Prestwood	3:55

== Personnel ==
Compiled from liner notes.

Musicians

- Bobby All — acoustic guitar (2,3,5,6,7,9,10)
- Eddie Bayers — drums (tracks 1,2,9)
- Richard Bennett — acoustic guitar (tracks 4,8)
- J. T. Corenflos — electric guitar (track 10)
- Stuart Duncan — fiddle (track 3)
- Ty England — lead vocals, background vocals (tracks 7,8)
- Paul Franklin — steel guitar (all tracks except 4)
- Garth Fundis — background vocals (track 7)
- John Gardner — drums (tracks 4,8)
- Aubrey Haynie — fiddle (track 2,5,6,7,9,10)
- John Hobbs — piano (tracks 5,6,7,10), organ (track 10)
- Paul Leim — drums (tracks 3,5,6,7,10)
- Mark Luna — background vocals (tracks 2,10)
- Brent Mason — electric guitar (all tracks except 10)
- Weldon Myrick — steel guitar (track 4)
- Steve Nathan — Wurlitzer electric piano (track 1), piano (tracks 2,4,8,9), keyboards
- Dave Pomeroy — bass guitar
- Hargus "Pig" Robbins — piano (track 3)
- John Wesley Ryles — background vocals (track 3)
- Billy Joe Walker Jr. — acoustic guitar (track 1)
- Dennis Wilson — background vocals (tracks 2,4,5,9)
- Curtis "Mr. Harmony" Young — background vocals (track 1,6)

Technical

- Garth Fundis — production, mixing
- Scott Pascchall — production assistant
- Denny Purcell — mastering
- Dave Sinko — recording, mixing

== Chart performance ==
Chart (1995)	Peak position
U.S. Billboard Top Country Albums	13
U.S. Billboard 200	95
Canadian RPM Country Albums	30
