= Irresistible You =

Single by Ty England

from the album Two Ways to Fall
- B-side: "You'll Find Somebody New"
- Released: August 10, 1996
- Genre: Country
- Length: 3:24
- Label: RCA Nashville
- Songwriter(s): Billy Lawson
- Producer(s): Byron Gallimore, James Stroud

Ty England singles chronology
"Redneck Son" (1996)	"Irresistible You" (1996)	"All of the Above" (1996)

"Irresistible You" is a song recorded by American country music artist Ty England. It was released in August 1996 as the first single from the album Two Ways to Fall. The song reached #22 on the Billboard Hot Country Singles & Tracks chart. The song was written by Billy Lawson.

== Chart performance ==
Chart (1996)	Peak position
US Hot Country Songs (Billboard)	22
Canadian RPM Country Tracks	25
