= Right Here (Charles Billingsley album) =

2016 studio album by Charles Billingsley

Studio album by Charles Billingsley
- Released: March 4, 2016
- Genre: Worship; Christian pop; bluegrass; southern gospel
- Length: 37:44
- Label: StowTown

Right Here is a studio album from Charles Billingsley. StowTown Records released the album on March 4, 2016.

== Critical reception ==
Professional ratings
Review scores
| Source | Rating |
|---|---|
| 365 Days of Inspiring Media | 4/5 stars |
| CCM Magazine | 4.5/5 stars |
| New Release Today | 3.5/5 stars |
| Today's Christian Entertainment | 3.8/5 stars |
| Worship Leader | 4.5/5 stars |

Awarding the album four and a half stars for CCM Magazine, Kevin Sparkman writes, "We love Right Here, and think it will stay with listeners across the board." Jonathan Andre, allotting the album a four star review at 365 Days of Inspiring Media, describes, "Sobering words from quite possibly one of today’s most underrated worship artists, Charles Billingsley’s new album Right Here is enjoyable, heartfelt, comforting, confronting, and everything else in between as all the songs (but one) strike a chord, and remind us all that worship can be delivered and choreographed in a variety of styles, from southern gospel to reflective to pop and straight out vertical worship." Kelly Meade, allocating the album a 3.8 star rating from Today's Christian Entertainment, states, "Start to finish, Right Here offers songs of hope and worship in a time when the world around us seems to grow increasingly troubled every day. A solid foundation built on faith and trust in God must be the anchor we cling to." Affixing a three and a half star rating upon the album at New Release Today, Phronsie Howell says, "Right Here reminds that no matter the situation, God is there and worthy of praise." Darryl Bryant, indicating in a four and a half star review at Worship Leader, writes, "the masterful album...is a majestic journey, and though authentic is often overused it unequivocally fits this album perfectly."

== Track listing ==
| No. | Title | Length |
|---|---|---|
| 1. | "I Let My Heart Open" | 3:27 |
| 2. | "Mountaintops" | 3:52 |
| 3. | "Jesus You Are" | 4:19 |
| 4. | "God Is Good" | 3:17 |
| 5. | "Right Here" | 4:47 |
| 6. | "Majesty (Here I Am)" | 5:37 |
| 7. | "Hallelujah for the Savior" | 4:37 |
| 8. | "Victory (The Blood of Jesus)" | 4:03 |
| 9. | "There's Nothing My God Cannot Do" | 3:19 |
| 10. | "See You Again" | 5:26 |
| 11. | "Horizon" | 5:52 |
| Total length: | | 37:44 |

== Chart performance ==
| Chart (2016) | Peak position |
|---|---|
| US Christian Albums (Billboard) | 13 |
| US Heatseekers Albums (Billboard) | 3 |
