= Radio Margaritaville =

- Broadcast area: Worldwide
- Frequencies: Sirius XM Radio 24; Dish Network 6024

Programming
- Format: Gulf and Western, Country, Rock, Reggae

Ownership
- Owner: Estate of Jimmy Buffett

History
- First air date: 1998 on the Internet; June 15, 2005 on SIRIUS; November 12, 2008 on XM

Links
- Website: Radio Margaritaville.com; SiriusXM: Radio Margaritaville

Radio Margaritaville is a worldwide Internet radio station and SiriusXM Satellite Radio station (Ch. 24) owned by the estate of Jimmy Buffett. It features 24-hour music and broadcasts of Jimmy Buffett's concerts.

== History ==
Buffett was inspired to create Radio Margaritaville after listening to radio stations in Australia, Key West, and to WOYS in Apalachicola, Florida. He was attracted to the channels' wide range of programming, as opposed to the homogenized playlists he heard elsewhere. In 1998 he contacted his friend, Coleman Sisson, about buying an AM radio station in Key West to "broadcast Cuban baseball games and my music." Sisson suggested that he create a station on the internet instead and Buffett agreed. They decided to call it Radio Margaritaville and Buffett recommended an old friend, Steve Huntington, to serve as program director for the newly formed station. The original broadcasts were programs created by Huntington and streamed using a 5 player CD player plugged into an IBM think pad connected to Real Networks. Buffett modeled the channel after pirate radio stations in terms of having no restrictions on what songs to play. It also recalled free-form FM radio of the 1970s with diverse playlists featuring music in the rock, jazz, blues, and folk genres. By 2002, Radio Margaritaville was one of the most popular Internet stations, though it had yet to build an audience that would rival small-market radio stations.

Radio Margaritaville joined Sirius Satellite Radio in 2005 on channel 31 (moving to XM 24 May 4, 2011) and Dish Network channel 6031. It became the first internet station to transition to mainstream radio, and can also be heard on radio. On November 12, 2008, following the merger of Sirius and XM Radio, the station was added to the XM lineup at channel 55 (moving to XM 24 May 4, 2011). Radio Margaritaville's program director is Kirsten Winquist and the General Manager is Coleman Sisson. On air talent consists of hosts Kirsten Winquist (VP Programming), JD Spradlin and Krystal King, Ryan Middledorf, Patrick McDonald and Sara West. The station is broadcast from Sunset Walk at Margaritaville Resort Orlando and from the lobby of the Margaritaville Hotel Nashville. Radio Margaritaville now has a stinger often heard between songs of a steel drum with a few notes of "Margaritaville", adding to station identity.

SiriusXM's station, "The Highway," added a Friday afternoon-drive program, Music Row Happy Hour, to its lineup in 2016. Hosted by Buzz Brainard, the show is broadcast from the Margaritaville Restaurant in Nashville and has featured visits from such artists as Brett Eldredge, Maren Morris, and Blake Shelton. The show "created a natural cross-promotion with Jimmy Buffett’s Radio Margaritaville channel." As of August 2017, Radio Margaritaville averages three million unique listeners a week.

Buffett died September 1, 2023; the service is still operational at the time.

== Artists played ==
- Jimmy Buffett
- Mac McAnally
- Jack Johnson
- Kenny Chesney
- Sheryl Crow
- The Beach Boys
- Zac Brown Band
- Bob Marley
- Toots and the Maytals
- Little Feat
- Paul Simon
- UB40
- Jerry Jeff Walker
- Alan Jackson
- Toucans Steel Drum Band
- Steve Goodman
- John Hiatt
- Lyle Lovett
- James Taylor
- Keith Sykes
- Sonny Landreth
- Kacey Musgraves
- Jon Batiste
- Ashley McBryde
- Peter Mayer
- Taj Mahal
- Keb' Mo'
- Garth Brooks
- The Neville Brothers
- Allen Toussaint
- The War and Treaty
- The Eagles
- Warren Zevon
- Iam Tongi
- Buena Vista Social Club
- Sam Cooke
- Otis Redding
- Los Lonely Boys
- The Allman Brothers Band
- George Strait
- The Wheeland Brothers
- Emily Zeck
- John Mayer
- Jesse Winchester
- Club Trini
- Keith Urban
- The Doobie Brothers
- Third World
- Angelique Kidjo

== See also ==
- List of Sirius Satellite Radio stations
- Jimmy Buffett's Margaritaville
- Margaritaville
