= Bobby Penn =

Bonny Penn
- Origin: United States
- Genres: Country
- Occupation: Musician
- Instruments: Guitar, voice
- Years active: 1970s, 1980s
- Labels: Brylen, 50 States Records, Charta Records

Bobby Penn is an American country music singer-songwriter and musician. He had three charting hits. His most successful was "You Were on My Mind".

== Background ==
Bobby Penn recorded for the 50 States and Brylen labels. He had three charting country hits. They were "You Were on My Mind" in 1971, the Lonnie Mack composition, "Watch Out for Lucy" in 1974 and "Little Weekend Warriors" in 1976.

His version of "You Were On My Mind" made the Billboard Hot Country Singles chart in 1971. Another charting single for him was a cover of the Lonnie Mack song, "Watch Out for Lucy", which was also the first single that his label had distributed by Nationwide Sound Distributors.

== Career ==
On the week of July 3, 1971, Bobby Penn's single "You Were on My Mind" made its debut at no. 72 on the Billboard, Hot Country Singles chart. It was also a "star performer". It peaked at no. 51. He would go on to do well with "Sunshine Lady", "High Heel Sneakers" and "Lay Your Sweet Lovin' On Me", and have success with "Watch Out for Lucy".

"Lay Your Sweet Lovin' on Me" was reviewed by Record World in the magazine's May 26, 1973 issue. It was also one of the country single picks. The reviewer said, "Very commercial sound that will get played more than a deck of cards in Las Vegas". It was noted in the June 23, 1973, issue "Lay Your Sweet Loving on Me" was a pick at KWAM. It debuted at no. 75 in the Record World Country Singles Chart on the week of August 4.

His single "Watch Out for Lucy" made the Cash Box Country Top 75 chart. It got to no. 56 on the week of October 12, 1974. Following his success with "Watch Out for Lucy", his label 50 States announced his forthcoming album.

In 1976, he recorded the song "Little Weekend Warriors" which was released on 50 States FS-42. It was a recommended record in the Billboard Top Single Picks section.
