= Charles Billingsley (musician) =

American singer (born 1970)

Charlie Billingsley
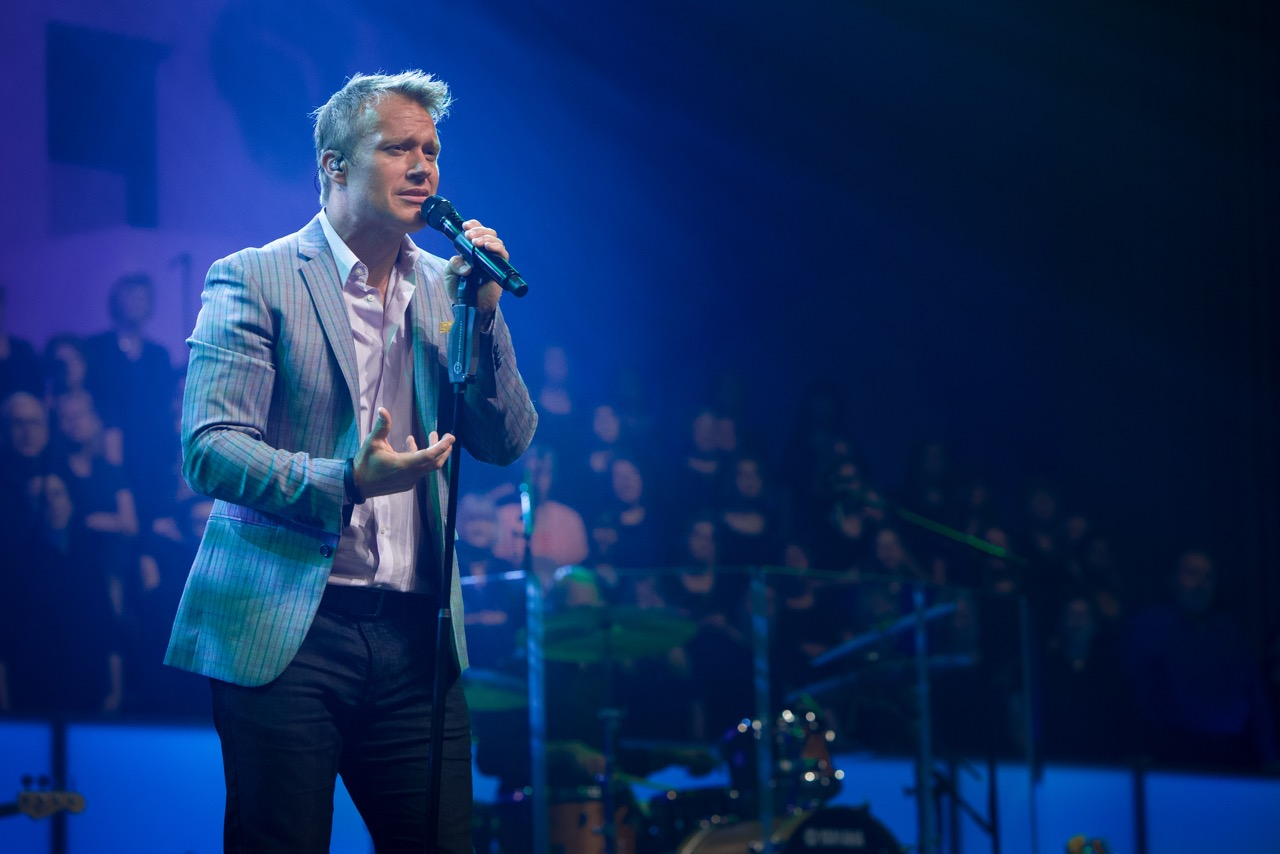

Background information
- Born: Charles Clyde Billingsley; January 7, 1970 (age 56); Clovis, New Mexico, U.S.
- Genres: CCM; Christian rock; pop
- Occupations: Preacher; singer; songwriter; musician; author; teacher; speaker
- Instruments: Vocals, Flugelhorn
- Years active: 1992–present
- Website: charlesbillingsley.com

Charles Billingsley (born January 7, 1970, in Clovis, NM) is a preacher, Christian singer, worship leader, songwriter, speaker and author.

== Career ==
Billingsley began his solo career the day after he graduated from Samford University in Birmingham, Alabama, in 1992. After two years, he joined the contemporary Christian music group NewSong. In 1994, they released People Get Ready featuring "Arise My Love." That album had four number one hits. After two years with NewSong, Charles left to pursue a solo career, averaging 200 concerts a year.

In 2002 Billingsley became the worship pastor at Thomas Road Baptist Church, as well as the artist-in-residence at Liberty University. In 2005, Billingsley moved to San Diego, California, to work with Dr. David Jeremiah at the Shadow Mountain Community Church, home of Turning Point Ministries.

After two years in San Diego, Billingsley returned to Thomas Road Baptist Church where he resumed his position of worship leader and served on the advisory council of the Center for Worship at Liberty University. In 2011, he helped launch a new publishing company, Red Tie Music, that is a partnership with Thomas Road Baptist Church and Liberty University. On May 14, 2017, Billingsley announced he would be returning to Shadow Mountain Community Church to work with Dr. David Jeremiah as worship pastor.

In July 2017, Billingsley became the worship pastor at Shadow Mountain Community Church. Billingsley still travels throughout the year as a worship leader for the Women of Joy, Gridiron Men and Celebrator's conferences as well as a solo concert artist.

In February 2019, Billingsley announced his departure from Shadow Mountain Community Church to pursue his concert ministry full-time.

Returned to Thomas Road Baptist Church.

In 2026, Billingsley published his fourth book, The ADVENTurous Life.

Billingsley continues to travel as a touring artist and conference speaker.

== Discography ==
1992	Choice of a Lifetime	Crest Music
1993	Until Then	Crest Music
1994	People Get Ready (with NewSong)	Benson
1997	Change	Crest Music
1997	Charles Live!	Crest Music
1998	Between the Now and Then	Pamplin Music
1998	Grateful Hearts†	EMI
2000	Great Choirs of America†	
2000	Marks of the Mission	Pamplin Music
2001	Reflections	Crest Music
2002	Celtic Cry†	Discovery House
2002	What's It All About?†	Discovery House
2003	Secret Conversation	Perpetual Entertainment Group
2003	Toddler Lullabies†	Discovery House
2004	American Worship Gathering†	Worship Alliance
2004	We Bless Your Name	Perpetual Entertainment Group
2007	Better than Life†	Discovery House
2007	Christmas	Crest Music
2007	Enduring Treasures	Crest Music
2008	Classics	Crest Music
2008	Hope, Love and Music	Crest Music
2009	Extraordinary Women Live Worship	EWomen
2009	God of the Ages	Red Tie Music
2009	Thomas Road Worship	Red Tie Music
2010	Women of Joy: Weekend of Praise	Red Tie Music/PWM
2011	Never Forsaken	Crest Music
2012	20	Crest Music
2013	In Concert	Crest Music/InPop
2014	Only Jesus	Crest Music
2016	Right Here	StowTown
2017	It's Christmastime Again	Crest Music
2020	I Was Made For This	StowTown
2022	The Shadow of Your Smile	Club 44
2023	Stories and Songs	StowTown
2026	Replay	StowTown
