= Two Ways to Fall =

Studio album by Ty England
- Released: September 17, 1996
- Genre: Country
- Length: 31:54
- Label: RCA Nashville
- Producer: Byron Gallimore, James Stroud

Ty England chronology
Ty England (1995)	Two Ways to Fall (1996)	Highways & Dance Halls (1999)

Singles from Two Ways to Fall
- 1. "Irresistible You" Released: August 10, 1996; 2. "All of the Above" Released: December 1996

Professional ratings
Review scores
Source	Rating
Allmusic	4/5 stars

Two Ways to Fall is the second studio album by American country music artist Ty England. His second and final album for the RCA Nashville label, it produced the singles "Irresistible You" and "All of the Above", which peaked at #22 and #46, respectively, on the Billboard Hot Country Singles & Tracks (now Hot Country Songs) charts. "I'll Take Today" was originally recorded by Tanya Tucker on her 1994 album Fire to Fire, and would later be released as a single by Gary Allan from his 1998 album It Would Be You.

== Track listing ==
No.	Title	Writer(s)	Length
1.	"It Starts with 'L'"	Sandy Ramos	2:56
2.	"Two Ways to Fall"	Mark D. Sanders, Barry Tashian, Holly Tashian	2:43
3.	"I'll Take Today"	Will Robinson, Kent Robbins	3:05
4.	"Never Say Never"	Craig Wiseman, Al Anderson	2:49
5.	"The Last Dance"	Roger Springer, Reese Wilson, Tony Martin	3:01
6.	"Kick Back"	Springer, Wilson, Martin	2:54
7.	"Irresistible You"	Billy Lawson	3:24
8.	"Backslider's Prayer"	Bob Regan, Sanders	3:45
9.	"All of the Above"	Jon Robbin, Chris Waters	3:15
10.	"Sure"	Hugh Prestwood	4:02

== Personnel ==
- Mike Brignardello — bass guitar
- Larry Byrom — acoustic guitar
- Mark Casstevens — acoustic guitar
- Joe Chemay — bass guitar
- Dan Dugmore — steel guitar
- Glen Duncan — fiddle
- Ty England — lead vocals
- Larry Franklin — fiddle
- Sonny Garrish — steel guitar
- Dann Huff — electric guitar
- Paul Leim — drums
- Brent Mason — electric guitar
- Steve Nathan — piano
- Gary Prim — piano
- Michael Rhodes — bass guitar
- Joe Spivey — fiddle
- Dennis Wilson — background vocals
- Lonnie Wilson — drums
- Curtis Wright — background vocals
- Curtis Young — background vocals

== Chart performance ==
Chart (1996)	Peak position
U.S. Billboard Top Country Albums	54
