= Mickey Buckins =

- Born: Charles Michael Buckins
- Occupations: Musician, songwriter, producer, engineer
- Instrument: Drums
- Formerly of: Mickey Buckins & The New Breed, Muscle Shoals Rhythm Section

Mickey Buckins is a musician, songwriter and record producer. As a songwriter he has written or co-written hits for Big Ben Atkins, Clarence Carter, Billy Crash Craddock, Terri Gibbs, The Osmonds, and Spencer Wiggins.

== Background ==
During the 1960s, Buckins worked for Fame Studios. One of the artists he worked with was James Govan. Another was Bobby Hatfield.

Examples of his work can be found on Bettye Swann's The Complete Atlantic Recordings album. It has seven songs on it that were produced at Muscle Shoals Studio by Rick Hall and Mickey Buckins between 1972 and 1973.

== Career ==
=== 1960s ===
During the mid-1960s, he fronted his group Mickey Buckins & The New Breed. They toured throughout the Southeast. The group recorded three singles, " Silly Girl" / "Long Long Time" that was released on Norala 6603 in 1966, "Long Long Time" / "Seventeen Year Old Girl" that was released on South Camp 7004 in 1967, and "Reflections of Charles Brown" / "Big Boy Pete", released on South Camp 7007 the same year.

In 1967, Buckins was hired by Rick Hall of Fame Studios. Multi-tasking, Buckins would work his way up the ladder.

Buckins and George Jackson wrote the song "The Feeling is Right" which was recorded by Clarence Carter. The Rick Hall produced single was released in 1969. The song peaked at no. 9 on the Billboard Best Selling Rhythm & Blues Singles chart on the week of August 2.

=== 1970s ===
Buckins was enlisted by Rick Hall to produce Bobby Hatfield's 1971 album, Messin' in Muscle Shoals. Buckins also served as the recording engineer. A number of his compositions also appeared on the album.

Buckins and Sonny Limbo produced the self-titled album for Eddie Middleton who was discovered by A&R man, Steve Popovich. The album was recorded at Bill Lowery's Lowery Studio. It was released in 1977.

Buckins wrote "We Don't Live Here, We Just Love Here" for Big Ben Atkins. The recording was produced by Sonny Limbo and released on GRT 161 in 1978. On the week of May 20, "We Don't Live Here, We Just Love Here" made its debut on the Record World Country Singles Chart at no 89. The single peaked at no. 80 on the week of June 3 and held the position for another week.

=== 1980s ===
Buckins was a percussionist on the 1982 album Just Another Day in Paradise by Bertie Higgins.

Together with Barbara Wyrick, Buckins wrote the song "Tell Me a Lie" which was a hit for Janie Fricke. The song spent a week at no. 1 on the Radio & Records chart (December 2, 1983) as well as a week at no. 1 on the Billboard chart (December 10, 1983).

=== 2000s ===
Buckins was part of an ensemble set to appear on July 28, 2018, at Florence's Shoals Theater, backing Travis Wammack in a tribute concert for Rick Hall of Fame Studios.

The song " Heart on a String" that he wrote with George Jackson was recorded by Lara Price and included on her Half & Half album that was released in June 2024.
