= 3 of Hearts =

American country music trio

- Also known as: Three of Hearts
- Origin: Fort Worth, Texas, United States
- Genres: Country
- Years active: 2001–2005
- Labels: RCA Nashville
- Past members: Blaire Stroud; Katie McNeill; Deserea Wasdin

3 of Hearts was an American country music trio composed of Blaire Stroud, Katie McNeill, and Deserea Wasdin, all natives of Fort Worth, Texas. Signed to RCA Nashville in 2001, the trio released its debut album in March of that year. Two of its singles entered the U.S. Billboard Hot Country Singles & Tracks charts, as did their rendition of "The Christmas Shoes."

== Biography ==
Blaire Stroud, Katie McNeill, and Deserea Wasdin first sang at a funeral; They were also students at L.D. Bell High School; later, they cut a demo tape which was eventually sent to RCA Nashville, who signed the trio to a record deal in 2000. They recorded the song, "Just Might Change Your Life", which appeared in the film and on the soundtrack for the film, Where the Heart Is, in the Summer of 2000. 3 of Hearts also embarked on a tour sponsored by Seventeen magazine, in which the trio performed at shopping malls and promoted prom-related fashion trends.

Their debut album, also titled 3 of Hearts, was released in March 2001. Two of its singles ("Love Is Enough" and "Arizona Rain") entered the U.S. Billboard Hot Country Singles & Tracks charts, peaking at No. 43 and No. 59 respectively. However, 3 of Hearts did not enter the Top 40 on the country music charts until early 2002, when their rendition of "The Christmas Shoes" reached a peak of No. 39.

== Discography ==
=== Studio albums ===
Title	Album details	Peak positions
Title	Album details	US Country
3 of Hearts	Release date: March 6, 2001; Label: RCA Nashville; Formats: CD	45

=== Singles ===
Year	Single	Peak positions	Album
Year	Single	US Country	Album
2001	"Love Is Enough"	43	3 of Hearts
2001	"Arizona Rain"	59	3 of Hearts
2002	"The Christmas Shoes"	39	Non-album single

=== Music videos ===
Year	Video
2001	"Love Is Enough"
