= The Christmas Shoes (song) =

2000 single by NewSong

Single by NewSong

from the album Sheltering Tree
- Released: 2000
- Recorded: 1999–2000
- Genre: CCM; Christmas; country pop
- Length: 4:50
- Label: Benson
- Songwriters: Leonard Ahlstrom, Eddie Carswell, Isaiah "DC" Daniel
- Producers: Chris Harris, Isaiah "DC" Daniel

"The Christmas Shoes" is a Christmas-themed song by the Christian vocal group NewSong. It was written by NewSong group members Eddie Carswell and Leonard Ahlstrom as well as syndicated radio personality Isaiah "DC" Daniel (of Steve & DC). The song was released through Benson Records as a bonus track on their 2000 album Sheltering Tree, at the urging of DC, who also co-produced the tune in the summer of 2000. It peaked at No. 31 on the Billboard Hot Country Songs chart spent one week at No. 1 on the Adult Contemporary chart and No. 42 on the Hot 100 chart.

== Synopsis ==
The song recounts the events experienced by the narrator completing the last of his gift shopping on Christmas Eve. He is waiting in a checkout line but is "not really in the Christmas mood" when he notices a young boy in front of him who wants to buy a pair of shoes for his terminally-ill mother: the boy tells the cashier he wants her to appear beautiful in her final moments before she passes away and "meets Jesus". Since he is short on money, the narrator ends up paying for the shoes, which reminds him of the true meaning of Christmas.

== Cover versions and other media ==
One year after NewSong released the song, country music girl group 3 of Hearts released their own version, which peaked at No. 39 on the country chart.

In 2002, Donna VanLiere produced a novelization of the song, which was published by St. Martin's Press. The book became a made-for-TV movie in December of that same year.

In 2005 Dutch singer René Froger recorded the song for his Pure Christmas album.

Pop-punk band FM Static released a cover of this song in 2008.

== Reception ==
"The Christmas Shoes" frequently polarizes audiences. While it is a staple of radio stations during the Christmas season, it is often criticized for exploiting poverty to generate a sentimental message and for the narrator's self-congratulatory tone after he gives the boy money. The song has been described as poverty porn.

The final verse, in which the narrator states that God sent the boy to remind him of the true meaning of Christmas, has led some commentators to claim that God intentionally made the boy's mother terminally ill in order to cause the events of the story. Christian commentators in particular have criticized this as a "malevolent portrayal of God" who "inflicts needless suffering on others to teach some jerk the true meaning of Christmas".

The song has appeared on various "worst Christmas song" lists. In 2011, the song was named "The Worst Christmas Song Ever" by Jezebel.com, following a weeks-long survey of commented votes.

Patton Oswalt devoted part of his stand-up performance to criticizing the song at the Lisner Auditorium in November 2009, which has since become famous.

== Certifications ==
Region	Certification	Certified units/sales
United States (RIAA)	Gold	500,000^{‡}
^{‡} Sales+streaming figures based on certification alone.

== See also ==
- List of number-one adult contemporary singles of 2001 (U.S.)
