= Highways & Dance Halls =

Studio album by Tyler England
- Released: November 23, 1999
- Genre: Country
- Label: Capitol Nashville
- Producer: Garth Brooks

Tyler England chronology
Two Ways to Fall (1996)	Highways & Dance Halls (1999)	Alive and Well and Livin' the Dream (2007)

Highways & Dance Halls is the third studio album by American country music artist Ty England. Released in 1999 as his only album for Capitol Nashville, it is also the only album which he recorded under the name Tyler England.

== Content ==
The tracks "My Baby No Está Aquí No More", "She Don't Care About Me", and "I'd Rather Have Nothing" were later recorded by Garth Brooks on his album The Lost Sessions. Additionally, "Travelin' Soldier" — originally cut in 1996 by its writer, Bruce Robison — would become a Number One country hit in 2003 when the Dixie Chicks released it. Also included is a re-recording of England's 1995 hit "Should've Asked Her Faster", featuring Steve Wariner as a guest musician.

== Critical reception ==
Professional ratings
Review scores
Source	Rating
Allmusic	3/5 stars

Giving it 3 out of 5 stars, Maria Konicki Dinoia of Allmusic wrote that "What England does lack is vocal enthusiasm, but he makes up for it in originality. Produced by his college buddy Garth Brooks, Highways & Dancehalls [sic] is a verifiable reprieve from the bubble gum music we've gotten used to hearing on radio".

== Track listing ==
1. "My Baby No Está Aquí No More" (Shane Stockton, David Stephenson) – 2:44
2. "She's Gonna Miss Me When He's Gone" (Stephenson) – 3:43
3. "She Don't Care About Me" (Bruce Robison) – 2:56
4. "I Drove Her to Dallas" (Mark Narmore, Tony Martin) – 3:33
5. "Blame It on Mexico" (Sherrie Gregg, Darrel Staedtler) – 2:58
6. "Forever" (Rafe Van Hoy) – 3:42
7. "Too Many Highways" (Clay Blaker, Stephenson) – 3:37
8. "Collect from Wichita" (Neal Coty, Randy VanWarmer) – 4:36
9. "I'd Rather Have Nothing" (Mike McClure) – 4:05
10. "I Knew I Loved You" (Byron Hill, Gary Scruggs) – 3:19
11. "Travelin' Soldier" (Robison) – 5:29
12. "Should've Asked Her Faster" (Bob DiPiero, Al Anderson, Joe Klimek) – 3:23
  - featuring Steve Wariner

== Personnel ==
From Highways & Dance Halls liner notes.

Musicians

- Sam Bacco - percussion
- Bruce Bouton - steel guitar
- Garth Brooks - acoustic guitar, background vocals
- Sam Bush - mandolin
- Mark Casstevens - acoustic guitar
- Mike Chapman - bass guitar
- Jerry Douglas - Dobro
- Rob Hajacos - fiddle
- Gordon Kennedy - electric guitar, background vocals
- Wayne Kirkpatrick - background vocals
- Chris Leuzinger - acoustic guitar, electric guitar
- The Nashville String Machine (Carl Gorodetzky, Pamela Sixfin, Conni Ellisor, Alan Umstead, Mary Kathryn Van Osdale, Bob Mason, and Jim Gorsjean) - strings
- Bruce Robison - steel guitar, background vocals
- Milton Sledge - drums, percussion
- Wayne Toups - accordion
- Steve Wariner - electric guitar, background vocals
- Bobby Wood - keyboards
- Andrea Zonn - background vocals

Technical

- Garth Brooks - production
- Dennis Burnside - string arrangements, conducting
- Eric Conn - digital editing
- Carlos Grier - digital editing
- Mark Miller - recording
- Denny Purcell - mastering
- Glenn Spinner - additional vocal recording
