= Hobo Jim =

American folk singer (1952–2021)

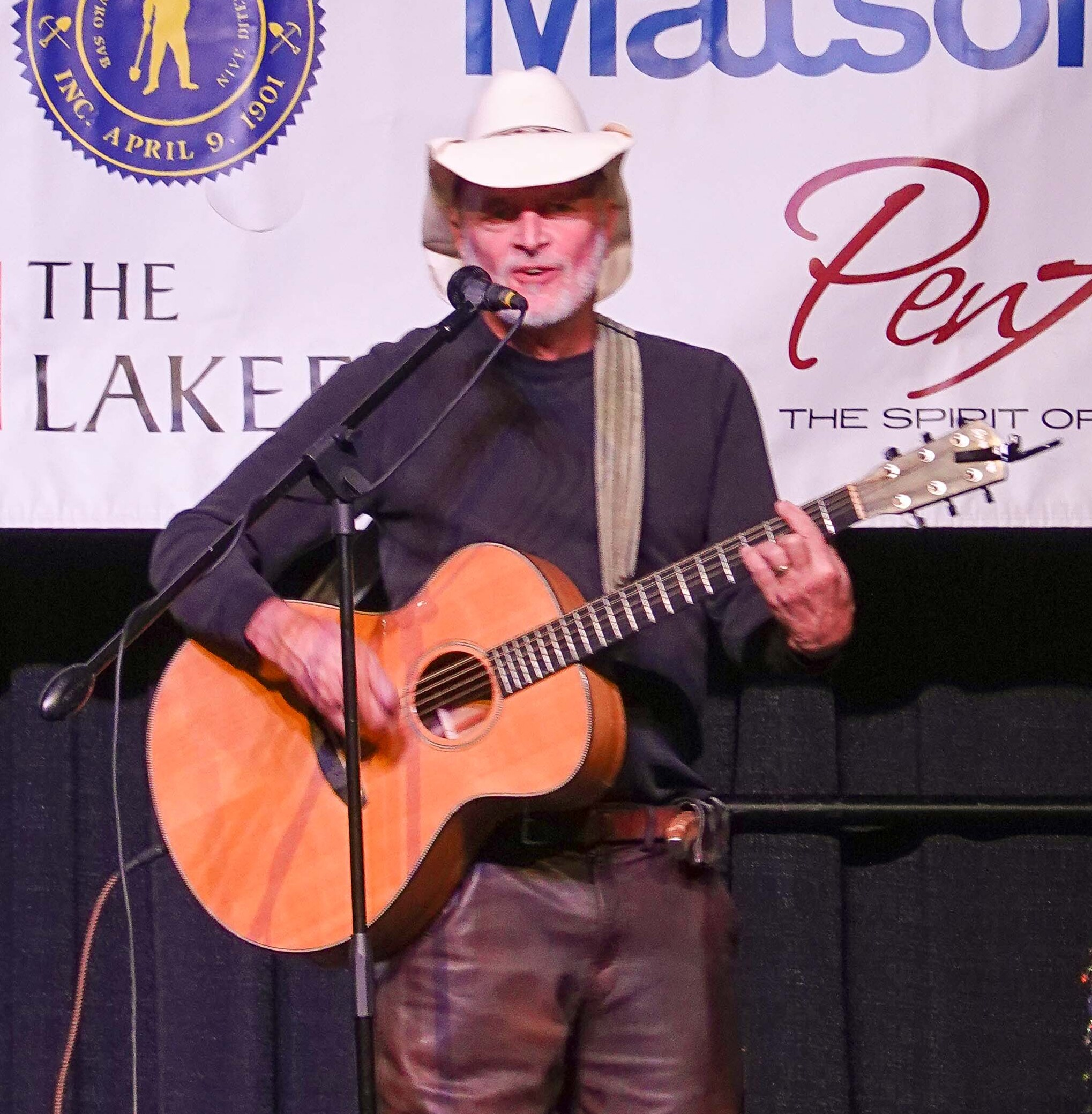
- Hobo Jim performing at the 2020 Iditarod mushers banquet in Anchorage, Alaska
- Born: December 21, 1952; Lafayette, Indiana
- Died: October 5, 2021 (aged 69); Nashville, Tennessee
- Other names: Jim Varsos
- Occupation: Singer-songwriter

Jim Varsos (1952 – October 5, 2021), known by the stage name Hobo Jim, was an Alaskan folk singer-songwriter. He was one of the most popular guitar players in Alaska, playing frequently at small venues across the state. In 1994, Hobo Jim was named Alaska's official balladeer.

== Early life and career ==
Varsos was born in Indiana in 1952, one of four children of Milton M. Varsos (1922–2013) and his wife Mary Ann (née Culbertson). His father was of Greek descent, and his family celebrated a number of Greek traditions. Varsos was raised in Madison, Wisconsin, where he began playing the guitar at the age of 12. He hitchhiked to Nashville after some time in college, hoping to make it as a country musician. After spending time hitchhiking and freight riding around the United States, he moved to Alaska in 1972. He settled in the state, making his home in Soldotna.

Varsos's songs are primarily regional and occupational songs, focusing on Alaska's commercial fishermen, loggers, and miners. Perhaps the best known of these songs, "Iditarod Trail Song", commemorates the Iditarod Trail Sled Dog Race.

Varsos lived part-time in Nashville, where he worked with publisher Pat Higdon, singer Russell Smith, and writer Rory Bourke, among others. His song "The Rock", which he co-wrote with Smith, has been recorded by Etta James and George Jones; he also co-wrote the Janis Ian song "Empty".

== Personal life and death ==
Varsos was a collector of Alaska Native artifacts.

In 2018, Varsos received an Honorary Doctorate in Fine Arts from the University of Alaska Fairbanks.

On September 18, 2021, Varsos announced that he had been diagnosed with terminal cancer. He died in Nashville, Tennessee, on October 5, 2021.

== Discography ==
- Thunderfoot (1982)
- Lost and Dyin' Breed (1985)
- Where Legends Are Born (1986)
- Collection (1994)
- Wilderness Way (1996)
- Woodsmoke (2004)
- My Wild and Wolfen Ways (2015)
