= Ty England =

American country singer (born 1963)

- Also known as: Tyler England
- Born: Gary Tyrone England; December 5, 1963 (age 62)
- Origin: Oklahoma City, Oklahoma, U.S.
- Genre: Country
- Occupation: Singer
- Instruments: Vocals, guitar
- Years active: 1989–present
- Labels: RCA Nashville; Capitol Nashville; Triple T
- Website: http://www.tyengland.com

Gary Tyrone England (born December 5, 1963) is an American country music singer and guitarist.

Initially a member of Garth Brooks' band, England began his solo career in 1995, recording a self-titled debut album on RCA Nashville. A second album, Two Ways to Fall, followed in 1996. Three years later, he recorded Highways & Dance Halls under the name Tyler England on Capitol Nashville, and Alive and Well and Livin' the Dream came in 2007 on the independent Triple T label. England has charted six singles on the country chart. His highest-charting single was his debut, "Should've Asked Her Faster", a No. 3 hit in late 1995.

In 2026, he ran in the Republican Party primary for the 2026 United States Senate election in Oklahoma but did not secure the nomination.

== Biography ==
England began playing guitar during his youth. He sang with various bands in high school, and performed in his school chorus. While working at a coffee shop during his time as a student at Oklahoma State University, fellow student Garth Brooks met him and soon the two were roommates. They performed together until failing grades forced England to move back home. He did eventually get a degree in marketing, but he worked at an automotive paint store.

By 1988, Garth had moved to Nashville, and after landing a recording contract, called England to come be his guitarist and backup vocalist. In 1995, England left Brooks' road band and signed to RCA Records Nashville. His self-titled debut album, released in late 1995, produced his first chart single in the No. 3 "Should've Asked Her Faster", although the album's other two singles ("Smoke in Her Eyes" and "Redneck Son") fell short of Top 40. A second album, Two Ways to Fall, followed in 1996. It produced his only other Top 40 country hit in the No. 22 "Irresistible You" followed by "All of the Above" at No. 46. After the latter, England exited RCA's roster.

In 1999, England signed to Capitol Nashville, the same label to which Brooks was signed at the time. His third album, Highways & Dance Halls was issued under the name Tyler England. It produced three singles in "Too Many Highways", "I Drove Her to Dallas" (which peaked at No. 53) and "I'd Rather Have Nothing." Also included on this album was a re-recording of "Should've Asked Her Faster", as well as the Bruce Robison song "Travelin' Soldier", which would later become a Number One hit in 2003 for the Dixie Chicks. He did not release another album until 2007's Alive and Well and Livin' the Dream, which included the non-charting singles "Redneck Anthem" and "The Perfect Girl."

England was defeated in the Republican Party primary of 2026 United States Senate election in Oklahoma.

== Discography ==
=== Albums ===
Title	Album details	Peak chart positions		
Title	Album details	US Country	US	CAN Country
Ty England	Release date: August 15, 1995; Label: RCA Nashville	13	95	30
Two Ways to Fall	Release date: September 17, 1996; Label: RCA Nashville	54	—	—
Highways & Dance Halls (as Tyler England)	Release date: November 23, 1999; Label: Capitol Nashville	—	—	—
Alive and Well and Livin' the Dream	Release date: January 23, 2007; Label: Triple T	—	—	—
"—" denotes releases that did not chart

=== Singles ===
Year	Single	Peak chart positions			Album
Year	Single	US Country	US Bubbling	CAN Country	Album
1995	"Should've Asked Her Faster"	3	21	2	Ty England
1995	"Smoke in Her Eyes"	44	—	41	Ty England
1996	"Redneck Son"	55	—	—	Ty England
1996	"Irresistible You"	22	—	25	Two Ways to Fall
1997	"All of the Above"	46	—	53	Two Ways to Fall
1999	"Too Many Highways"	—	—	—	Highways & Dance Halls (as Tyler England)
2000	"I Drove Her to Dallas"	53	—	—	Highways & Dance Halls (as Tyler England)
2001	"I'd Rather Have Nothing"	—	—	—	Highways & Dance Halls (as Tyler England)
2006	"Redneck Anthem"	—	—	—	Alive and Well and Livin' the Dream
2007	"The Perfect Girl"	—	—	—	Alive and Well and Livin' the Dream
"—" denotes releases that did not chart

=== Music videos ===
Year	Video	Director
1995	"Should've Asked Her Faster"	Martin Kahan
1995	"Smoke in Her Eyes"	Martin Kahan
2000	"I Drove Her to Dallas"	Gerry Wenner

== Awards and nominations ==
Year	Organization	Award	Nominee/Work	Result
1996	TNN/Music City News Awards	Male Star of Tomorrow	Ty England	Nominated
1997	TNN/Music City News Awards	Male Star of Tomorrow	Ty England	Nominated
