= Bertie Higgins =

American singer-songwriter (born 1944)

- Born: Elbert Joseph Higgins; December 8, 1944 (age 81)
- Origin: Tarpon Springs, Florida, United States
- Genres: Country; soft rock; adult contemporary; tropical rock
- Occupations: Singer-songwriter; actor; producer; director
- Years active: 1981–present
- Labels: Kat Family; Epic; Toucan Cove; Universal Music
- Website: bertiehiggins.com

Elbert Joseph "Bertie" Higgins (born December 8, 1944) is an American singer-songwriter. In 1982, Higgins had a top 40 album with Just Another Day in Paradise. It spawned the hit song "Key Largo", which referenced the Humphrey Bogart and Lauren Bacall film of the same name and reached No. 8 on the US Billboard Hot 100, No. 1 on the Billboard Adult Contemporary chart and No. 50 on the Billboard Country chart.

== Early career ==
Higgins was born in Tarpon Springs, Florida, United States, and is of Portuguese, Irish and German descent. He once supported himself as a sponge diver, and began his career in show business at the age of twelve as a ventriloquist. He won prizes in local talent contests and became a favorite at school assemblies around Tampa Bay, Florida. Higgins has stated that he is related to German poet Johann Wolfgang von Goethe.

Higgins' first band played proms, homecoming dances, and sock hops. After graduating from Tarpon Springs High School, Higgins enrolled in St. Petersburg College to study journalism and fine art. He eventually left college and became a drummer for Tommy Roe in his sometime backup band The Roemans, and played alongside such groups as The Rolling Stones and The Beach Boys.

Tiring of the rigors of the road and yearning to make his own musical statement, Higgins left The Roemans and returned home to Florida. He put down his drumsticks, picked up a guitar and began crafting music and lyrics. Music producers such as Bob Crewe, Phil Gernhard, and Felton Jarvis took an interest in him and contributed to the growth of the young songwriter. Higgins' talent flourished and he was in demand to play venues throughout the state. During this period, he also met and became a protégé of actor/director Burt Reynolds, who saw Higgins' writing potential and tutored him in screenwriting.

== Peak success ==
In 1980, Higgins moved to Atlanta and met record producer Sonny Limbo. He arranged a meeting between Higgins and music publisher Bill Lowery, whom Higgins had known through Tommy Roe. Higgins had been working on a song about a failed romance and presented the rough cut to Lowery and Limbo. They helped him perfect the lyrics of the song that became "Key Largo" Higgins recorded the master and presented it to Kat Family Records, a newly formed CBS/Sony distributing company. After an initial rejection, Kat Family agreed to release the single. The song eventually landed in the Billboard pop charts at number eight, in the Billboard adult contemporary charts it reached number one, and hit the top ten in Canada, Australia and other countries internationally. It also charted in the Billboard country chart. On the strength of the song's success, an album was released titled Just Another Day in Paradise. Other singles followed, such as "Just Another Day in Paradise", "Casablanca", and "Pirates and Poets", but none matched the success domestically of his breakout hit, though "Casablanca" went on to become a major hit in some Pacific Rim countries.

== Later years ==
Higgins' subsequent albums failed to chart, although he had a minor adult contemporary hit with "When You Fall in Love" in 1983 from his second album Pirates and Poets.

After his commercial success waned, Higgins and his band toured extensively around the globe, and he continues to tour on a regular basis in the Pacific Rim and domestically.

Higgins has served on the Board of Governors of the Atlanta Chapter of the Academy of Recording Arts and Sciences for several years. Besides maintaining a rigorous schedule of one-nighters, he also makes regular appearances on the Las Vegas strip.

Higgins has moved into film production with his sons Julian and Aaron, producing Beast Beneath (distributed by Entertainment One), 2009's Poker Run (also distributed by Entertainment One) and 2012's The Colombian Connection, starring Tom Sizemore, and "Christmas in Hollywood".

== Legacy ==
He was inducted into the Florida Music Hall of Fame with a lifetime achievement award in January 2016 along with Jimmy Buffett, Julio Iglesias and Tom Petty. In 2019 he was also inducted in the Florida Artists Hall of Fame along with such notables as Ernest Hemingway.

Jazz vocalist Nancy Wilson recorded a version of the Bertie Higgins original song "Casablanca" for EMI Records.

In 2009, "Key Largo" was ranked No. 75 on VH1's 100 Greatest One-Hit Wonders of the 80s.

His die-hard fans are called "Boneheads".

In 2025, in the aftermath of the attempted assassination of then presidential candidate Donald Trump, Higgins voiced his support for his campaign, releasing his first dance song, "Do the Donald", and stating on his website that "I have always been a believer in Mr. Trump."

== Discography ==
=== Albums ===
Year	Album	Peak chart positions		Label
Year	Album	US	AUS	Label
1982	Just Another Day in Paradise	38	32	Epic
1983	Pirates and Poets	—	—	Kat Family/CBS
1985	Gone With the Wind	—	—	CBS (Japan) (available on vinyl only)
1991	Back to the Island	—	—	Polydor (Japan)
1994	Back to the Island	—	—	Southern Tracks (different track listing than above album)
1999	Trop Rock	—	—	Key Largo
2003	Island Bound	—	—	Sony
2007	The Ultimate Collection (compilation)	—	—	Madacy
2008	A Buccaneer's Diary	—	—	Key Largo
2008	The Essential Playlist (compilation)	—	—	Toucan Cove/Universal
2009	Captiva	—	—	Toucan Cove/Universal
2012	Year of the Dragon	—	—	Toucan Cove/Universal
2014	Bertie Higgins, Live	—	—	Toucan Cove/Universal
2014	The Very Best of Trop Rock (compilation with 1 new song)	—	—	Toucan Cove/Universal
2014	Cowboys of the Caribbean (compilation with 4 new songs)	—	—	Toucan Cove/Universal
2015	The World's Greatest Lover (compilation with 3 new songs)	—	—	Huayi Brothers Media (the Pacific Rim including China)
2015	Dancing in the Tradewinds (compilation with 1 new song)	—	—	Toucan Cove/Universal
2016	Gold from My Treasure Chest (covers)	—	—	Toucan Cove/Universal
2016	Scrap Book (early recordings)	—	—	Toucan Cove/Universal
2016	Forever Casablanca	—	—	Huayi Brothers Media (the Pacific Rim including China)
2019	Wanted	—	—	Toucan Cove/Universal (digital only)
2021	Greatest Hits	—	—	Toucan Cove / Universal

=== Singles ===
Year	Title	Peak chart positions							Album
Year	Title	US	US AC	US Country	AUS	CAN	CAN AC	CAN Country	Album
1981	"Key Largo"	8	1	50	2	3	1	34	Just Another Day in Paradise
1982	"Just Another Day in Paradise"	46	10	90	—	—	12	—	Just Another Day in Paradise
1982	"Casablanca"	—	—	—	—	—	—	—	Just Another Day in Paradise
1982	"Port O Call"	—	—	—	—	—	—	—	Just Another Day in Paradise
1983	"When You Fall in Love"	—	34	—	—	—	—	—	Pirates and Poets
1983	"Pirates and Poets"	—	—	—	—	—	—	—	Pirates and Poets
1983	"Tokyo Joe"	—	—	—	—	—	—	—	Pirates and Poets
1988	"You Blossom Me"	—	—	72	—	—	—	—	Singles only
1989	"Homeless People"	—	—	75	—	—	—	—	Singles only
2014	"Cowboys of the Caribbean"	—	—	—	—	—	—	—	Singles only
2014	"Just Another Day in Paradise" (country version)	—	—	—	—	—	—	—	Singles only
2014	"Key Largo" (country version)	—	—	—	—	—	—	—	Singles only
2015	"The Flag's on Fire"	—	—	—	—	—	—	—	Singles only
2015	"The World's Greatest Lover"	—	—	—	—	—	—	—	Singles only
2017	"Son of a Beach"	—	—	—	—	—	—	—	Singles only
2025	"Do the Donald"	—	—	—	—	—	—	—	Singles only
2026	"A River"	—	26	—	—	—	—	—	Singles only

=== Music videos ===
Year	Video
1982	"Key Largo"
1983	"When You Fall In Love"
1983	"Pirates And Poets"
2008	"The Flag's on Fire"
2011	"Casablanca"
