= NewSong =

Christian contemporary music group

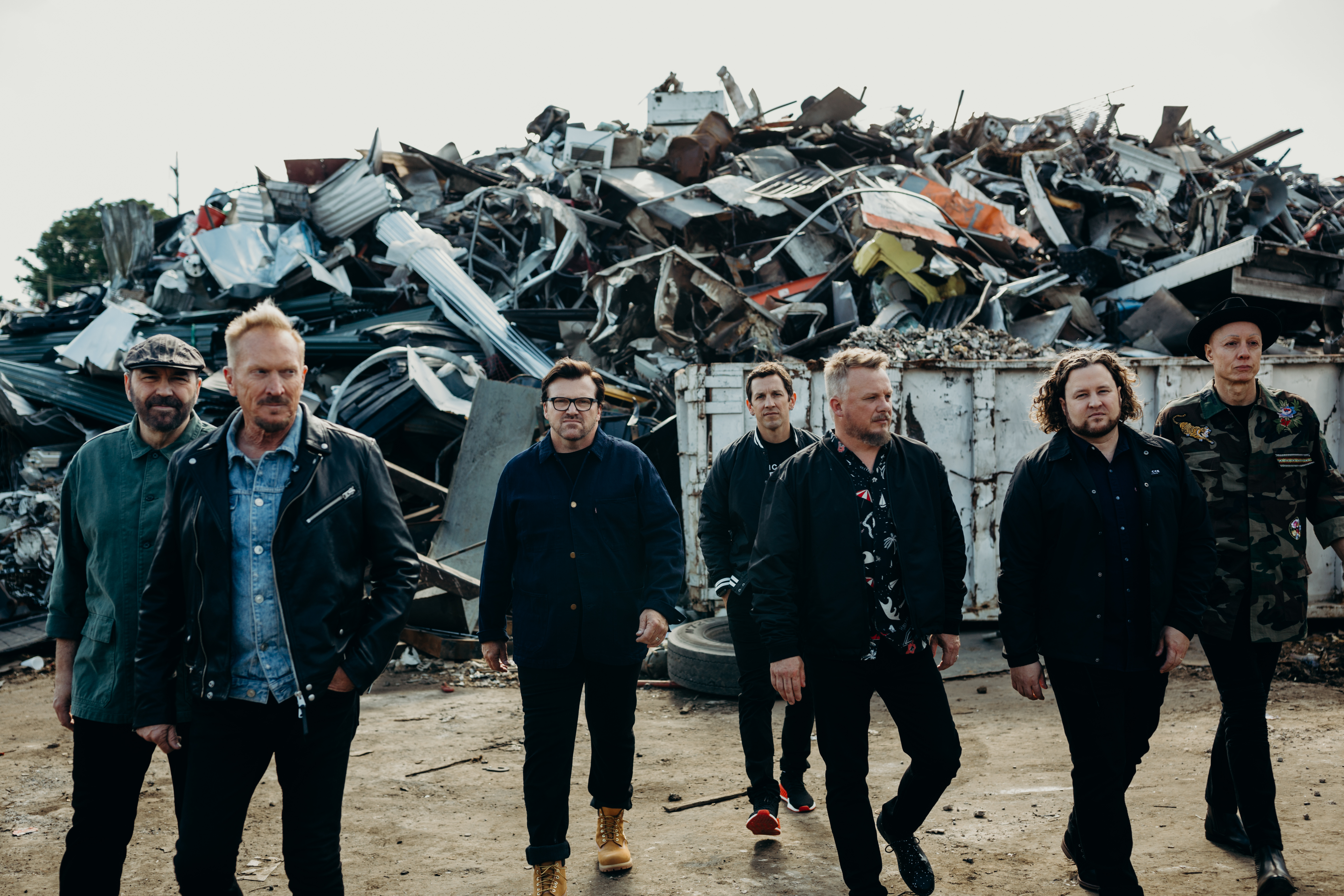
- NewSong in 2017

Background information
- Origin: Valdosta, Georgia, U.S.
- Genres: Contemporary Christian, Christian rock, gospel
- Years active: 1981–present
- Labels: Covenant; Canaan; Word; DaySpring; Benson; Reunion; Provident; HHM; Integrity
- Website: newsongonline.com

NewSong is an American contemporary Christian music group that was established in 1981, at Morningside Baptist Church in Valdosta, Georgia. They have had twelve GMA Dove Award nominations, and one Grammy Award Nomination.

They are also the founders of the Winter Jam Tour Spectacular which started in 1995, the United States' largest annual Christian music tour. Winter Jam has artists perform including TobyMac, Hillsong UNITED, Newsboys, Lecrae, MercyMe, and Skillet.

NewSong has provided support for organizations working with abandoned and underprivileged children. For years they worked with World Vision. Then in 2006, the band became involved with Holt International.

The original four members included the current members Eddie Carswell, Billy Goodwin, and former members Eddie Middleton and Bobby Apon.

== History ==
=== Early history ===
NewSong recorded three custom albums independently. In 1982, they signed on with Covenant Records, and released The Son In My Eyes that year. In 1984, they signed a contract with Canaan Records, a branch of CCM label giant Word Records and released The Word. NewSong continued to stay with Word Records until 1991 when they signed on with DaySpring Records. The next year they released One Heart At A Time, The Best of NewSong, which featured 12 hits from their previous albums. In 1993, they joined up with the Benson Music Group and released All Around The World, which brought four No. 1 hits. In 1993, lead vocalist Eddie Middleton left to pursue a solo career, and Bobby Apon left to spend more time with his family.

In 1994, songwriter Leonard Ahlstrom, soloist Charles Billingsley, musician Scotty Wilbanks, and the lead vocalist from the contemporary Christian band Truth, Russ Lee, joined NewSong. That year NewSong released People Get Ready which brought four No. 1 hits, and featured a re-recorded version of "Arise My Love", which was first recorded by the original group in 1987.

In 1996, Billingsley left to pursue a solo career. In 1997, NewSong released Love Revolution. It featured four No. 1 hits, including "Miracles," which stayed at No.1 on the CCM Adult Contemporary chart for four consecutive weeks.

In May 1999, Apon died. He was recognized on the album Arise, My Love, The Very Best of NewSong. This featured 12 of their previous No. 1 hits. It also included two new songs which became No. 1 hits, "Can't Keep A Good Man Down", and "Jesus To The World (Roaring Lambs)", which was inspired by Christian speaker and author Bob Briner, who died later that year. They also had a third new song, "Like Minded, Like Hearted", which NewSong recorded with Out of Eden of Gotee Records.

Lee left NewSong in 2000. In November, Wilbanks left as well to join the group Third Day, and to produce bands. They were replaced by soloist Michael O'Brien, Steve Reischl, and former Truth member, Matt Butler. Songwriter and electric guitarist Leonard Ahlstrom also left later to help a friend manage a recording label in Florida.

Leading up to 2000, NewSong caught the attention of radio personality, DC Daniel (then, of "Steve & DC") and began collaborating on production ideas for future projects. The partnership led to releasing the album Sheltering Tree, in late 2000.

==== Breakthrough ====
DC, Eddie Carswell and Leonard Ahlstrom penned the bonus track "The Christmas Shoes" for Sheltering Tree, which became a No. 1 mainstream radio hit in a Billboard chart-record three weeks, topping Billboard's Adult Contemporary Chart. Shortly after this, Clive Calder shut down the Benson label. NewSong stayed with Zomba Music, on the major Reunion label, and released a full studio Christmas album, The Christmas Shoes, which was nominated in 2003 for a Grammy Award for Best Pop/Contemporary Gospel Album. Along with the title track, the album featured a variety of original Christmas tunes and Christmas classics "O Holy Night". The song's success inspired Christian author Donna VanLiere to write a book based on the song. The book was later made into a TV movie for CBS, called The Christmas Shoes, starring Rob Lowe and Kimberly Williams-Paisley, which was released on December 1, 2002.

In 2003, Donna VanLiere released The Christmas Blessing, the second book in the series spawned by "The Christmas Shoes" song. It was later made into a TV movie by CBS. It had an appearance by NewSong, which showed them singing their holiday single "The Christmas Blessing". NewSong also received a Dove Award for Musical of the Year for The Christmas Shoes Musical.

In March 2004, NewSong announced that they were leaving Reunion Records and moving to Integrity Music. In November 2004, NewSong recorded their live worship album and DVD, Rescue: Live Worship at First Baptist Church of Woodstock with Wilbanks joining the group one more time. The album was officially released in May 2005, and the DVD of the concert came out in September. Also in 2005, NewSong was inducted into the Georgia Music Hall of Fame.

In March 2006, O'Brien left to restart his solo career and Drew Cline was asked to fill in. In September, Eddie Carswell, Matt Butler, Billy Goodwin, and guest artist Drew Cline released The Christmas Hope, featuring traditional Christmas carols, NewSong originals, and three songs to complement the book trilogy by Donna VanLiere. In November, The Christmas Shoes movie was released on DVD. The Christmas Hope, the third TV movie installment of the trilogy, was released in December 2008 by CBS.

In March 2007, Christian solo artist Nate Sallie joined NewSong as the lead vocalist. In April, The Christmas Hope album was nominated for a Dove Award, for Best Christmas Album of the Year. On December 29, 2008, in an email to subscribers of his newsletter, Russ Lee announced that he will be rejoining NewSong as lead vocalist. Consequently, Sallie left in 2009 just before the group recorded its next album Give Yourself Away.

Founding member Eddie Middleton died on August 21, 2021.

== Discography ==
=== Albums ===
Year	Album	Chart positions			Label
Year	Album	US Christian	US	US Heat	Label
1981	More Than Music				Independent
1982	The Son in My Eyes				Covenant
1984	The Word				Canaan
1986	Trophies of Grace				Word
1987	Say Yes!				Word
1989	Light Your World	34			Word
1990	Living Proof	19			DaySpring
1992	One Heart at a Time: The Best of NewSong				DaySpring
1993	All Around the World				Benson
1994	People Get Ready	16			Benson
1997	Love Revolution	25			Benson
1999	Arise My Love: The Very Best of NewSong	25			Benson
2000	Live...The Hits				Benson
2000	Sheltering Tree	5	130	2	Benson
2001	The Christmas Shoes	9	113	1	Reunion
2003	More Life	10	172	9	Reunion
2004	Simply NewSong				Provident
2005	The Very Best of NewSong				Reunion
2005	Rescue: Live Worship	10		15	Integrity
2006	The Christmas Hope	25		5	Integrity
2009	Give Yourself Away	10	149	5	HHM
2011	One True God	1	27		HHM
2013	Swallow the Ocean	3	65		HHM
2015	Faithful: Live Worship	3	88		Integrity
2016	The Best Christmas Ever	—	—		HHM
2018	Greatest Hits	—	—		HHM
2020	Just Jesus	—	—		HHM
2025	Church People				HHM

=== Singles ===
Year	Single	Chart Positions				Album
Year	Single	US AC	US	US Country	US Christ	Album
2000	"The Christmas Shoes"	1	42	31	20	Sheltering Tree
2004	"When God Made You"	33	—	—	—	More Life
2012	"The Same God"	—	—	—	25	One True God
2017	"I Am a Christian"	—	—	—	—	Just Jesus
2018	"Down"	—	—	—	—	Just Jesus
2018	"Bright"	—	—	—	—	Just Jesus
2018	"Glue"	—	—	—	—	Just Jesus
2018	"Already Loved" (featuring Tedashii)	—	—	—	—	Just Jesus
2018	"Shine"	—	—	—	—	Just Jesus
2018	"Look Up"	—	—	—	—	Just Jesus
2025	"Church People"	—	—	—	—	Church People
