= Indigo Music Corporation =

- Distributor: Indigo Music Corporation
- Genre: Various
- Country of origin: United States
- Location: Nashville

The Indigo Music Corporation was a Nashville-based company that was the umbrella organization for the Audiograph, Brylen Records, Indigo Music, and Phonorama Records labels.

== Background ==
The Indigo Music Corporation owned the Audiograph label. Other subsidiaries included the Brylen, & Phonorama Records labels. The artists included Mac Davis, Jeanne Pruett, Andres Segovia, Freddie Hart, The Four Freshmen, Patti Page, The Oak Ridge Boys, Stonewall Jackson, Mel Street, Charlie Louvin, Barbara Fairchild, Billy Walker, Rayburn Anthony, Sarah Vaughan, Lena Horne, Justin Tubb, Dowops, John Lee Hooker, Ferlin Husky, Ray Pillow and Big Ben Atkins.

According to the September 24, 1983 issue of Cash Box, the senior staff members included, president of Indigo Music Group Andy Andreason; Bill Simmons, vice president, NAVP; George Harper, director of administration. Indigo Music, Inc.; Mike Figlio, vice president. Indigo Music, Inc.; and Tom Stillwell, vice president, NAVP.

== History ==
According to the November 27, 1982 issue of Cash Box, Mike Figlio a man with a twenty-five-year history in the music industry which included past involvement with CBS Records, Music City Workshop and Koala Records had come on board as an Indigo staff member.

By early 1983, Arnold Theis became the director for sales and marketing. Theis had previously worked as sales manager for the Paid, Republic and Monument labels.

It was announced in March that Rebecca Norman who previously was with PolyGram Records in Dallas had joined Indigo Music Corp as a promotion assistant.

The April 2, 1983 issue of Cash Box announced that Indigo Music Corp had acquired Accord/Townhouse Records. The Accord/Townhouse label had been founded around 1981 as a budget and reissue label by Michael Gusick and William J. Levitt, a real estate tycoon. As a result, Indigo's catalogue had increased by 220 albums and there was to be a further 80 by the year's end. The label would function in an autonomous capacity with Indigo and would maintain its distribution with Capitol. Accord/Townhouse founder Gusick was to stay with the label for a year as a consultant. Also that month, Indigo had taken on two section directors. Lawrence C. Broderick had been in Toronto and moved to Nashville in 1976, where he bought Nuggett Studios, and had established his own production company. Also when he was in Toronto he had operated his own booking company. He had taken up the position of director of international sales and distribution with Indigo. The other new staff member was Robert J. Ciotti. He had operated his own consultancy business.

On April 1, 1984, the company launched the Prime of Life Network as their entry into the market of national television. It was aimed at people over the age of 45 and the subject matter would be health, travel and in entertainment, the music would be from the big band era and classic movies. A country music thirteen part series, Nashville Backstreets was scheduled for the network.

== Subsidiaries ==
=== Brylen Records ===
Big Ben Atkins was the first white singer signed to the Stax Records label. He recorded the album Reachin’ for the Feeling which was released on Brylen BN-4417 in 1982.

Pearl Handle was a band that was formed in Illinois in 1974. The original line up was George Milspaugh on guitar and vocals, Dan Hurc on guitar, Mickey Gentile on bass and Dean Aliotta on drums. Some years later they recorded an album in Nashville with Nelson Larkin as the producer and Ron “Snake” Reynolds as the producer. The album wasn't released due to the studio and label Sunbird Records going out of business. And the tape was unrecoverable. For about three or four years they didn't hear about the album or its outcome until they were alerted by a friend. He was going through cassette tapes at a truck stop and alerted them. Apparently Brylen Records had managed to get access to the recordings and the album of seven tracks Pearl Handle was released on Brylen 4420 in 1982.

Bobby Penn's Blue Lady album was released on Brylen BN 4470 in 1972.
