= Tropical rock =

Music genre

Tropical rock (also known as trop rock or Gulf and Western) is a genre of popular music that incorporates elements and influences of rock, reggae, country, folk, calypso, zydeco, and pop music, with themes and musical compositions inspired by an island style.

Although today tropical rock is usually associated with southern Florida and the Gulf Coast of the United States, tropical rock has its roots in calypso, rock, and country by artists such as Jerry Jeff Walker. Jimmy Buffett and his Coral Reefer Band helped create a tropical sub-culture beginning in the early to mid-1980s, along with other artists including Bertie Higgins.

== Description ==
Instrumentation is usually based around an acoustic guitar (as well as electric instrumentation), and often includes steel drums, congas, marimbas, vibraphones, steel guitars, or other percussion instruments to create an "island sound". While country and other musical styles focus on falling in love/falling out of love themes, Trop Rock's main focus is on "escapism"—a laid back lifestyle, tropical places, boating, simplifying and having fun. Buffett is often referred to as the "Pop of Trop Rock" alongside his Coral Reefer Band. They, along with other artists like Higgins, helped create a tropical sub-culture beginning in the early to mid-1980s. Mainstream artists Jack Johnson, Zac Brown Band, Alan Jackson, and Kenny Chesney also have songs in the genre as well.

== Trop Rock Radio ==
In 2000, WBWC, Dennis King of Island Time Radio began programming this format on the air in Cleveland, Ohio and streaming worldwide on Monday nights. Dennis King died in 2024 with his last show Tropical Play with DK airing on Radio Trop Rock. Radio Margaritaville, available on Sirius XM Radio, also plays many of the genre's hits. As the genre flourished with the guidance of the Trop Rock Music Association, independently owned internet radio stations began to rise to popularity within the "trop rock" genre to include Radio Trop Rock, Beach Radio, Beachfront Radio, Palapa Mac Radio, Shore Life Radio, Songwriter's Island Radio, Tiki Pod Radio, Permanent Vacation Radio, Beach Bar Radio, and Oyster Radio.

== See also ==
- Yacht rock
- Smooth jazz
- Quiet storm
