= Jimmy Buffett discography =

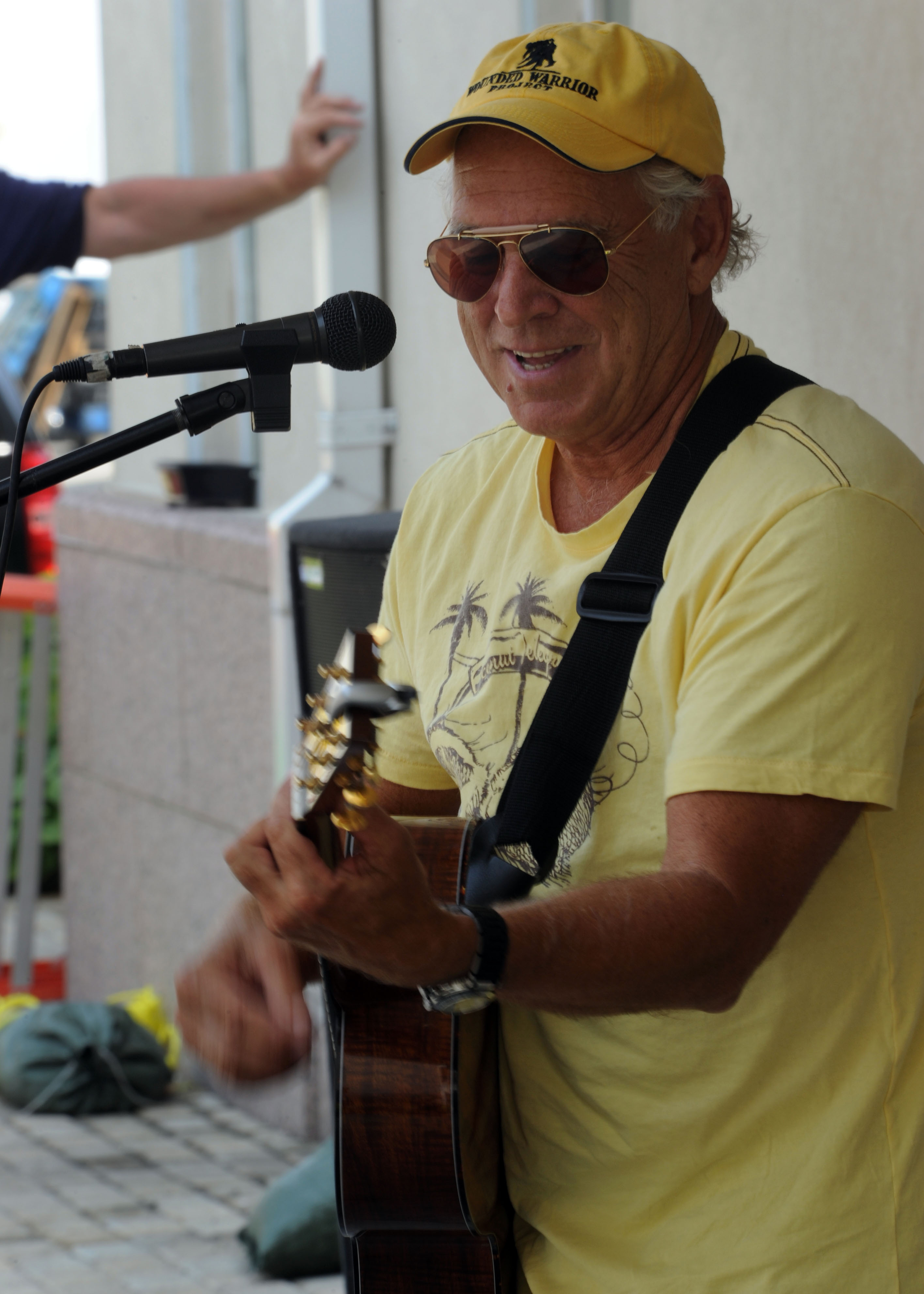
- Buffett performing in 2010
- Studio albums: 32
- Soundtrack albums: 2
- Live albums: 14
- Compilation albums: 11
- Singles: 67
- Music videos: 19
- No. 1 singles: 4

The discography of American singer-songwriter Jimmy Buffett consists of 32 studio albums, 11 compilation albums, 14 live albums, one soundtrack album, and 67 singles. Buffett was known for his unique style of music called "Gulf and Western", which combines elements of country, folk rock, pop, and Caribbean, with tropical lyrical themes. Buffett has sold over 20 million albums worldwide and had a net worth of $550 million.

== Studio albums ==
=== 1970s ===
Title	Album details	Peak chart positions				Certifications
Title	Album details	US	US Country	AUS	CAN	Certifications
Down to Earth	Release date: August 11, 1970; Label: Barnaby Records	—	—	—	—	
High Cumberland Jubilee	Release date: 1971; Label: Barnaby Records	—	—	—	—	
A White Sport Coat and a Pink Crustacean	Release date: June 1973; Label: ABC Records	205	43	—	—	
Living and Dying in 3/4 Time	Release date: February 1974; Label: ABC Records	176	—	46	—	
A1A	Release date: December 1974; Label: ABC Records	25	—	43	25	
Havana Daydreamin'	Release date: January 1976; Label: ABC Records	65	21	—	—	
Changes in Latitudes, Changes in Attitudes	Release date: January 1977; Label: ABC Records	12	2	—	43	RIAA: Platinum
Son of a Son of a Sailor	Release date: March 1978; Label: ABC Records	10	6	52	7	RIAA: Platinum
Volcano	Release date: August 1979; Label: MCA Records	14	13	50	26 (Note: Volcano also peaked at number 9 on the RPM Country Albums chart in Canada.)	RIAA: Gold
"—" denotes releases that did not chart

=== 1980s ===
Title	Album details	Peak chart positions			
Title	Album details	US	US Country	AUS	CAN
Coconut Telegraph	Release date: February 1981; Label: MCA Records	30	—	51	—
Somewhere over China	Release date: January 1982; Label: MCA Records	31	—	72	43
One Particular Harbour	Release date: September 1983; Label: MCA Records	59	35	—	—
Riddles in the Sand	Release date: September 1984; Label: MCA Records	95	18	—	—
Last Mango in Paris	Release date: June 1985; Label: MCA Records	53	7	—	—
Floridays	Release date: June 1986; Label: MCA Records	67	29	88	91
Hot Water	Release date: June 20, 1988; Label: MCA Records	46	—	85	—
Off to See the Lizard	Release date: June 19, 1989; Label: MCA Records	57	—	—	—
"—" denotes releases that did not chart

=== 1990s ===
Title	Album details	Peak chart positions		Certifications
Title	Album details	US	CAN	Certifications
Fruitcakes	Release date: May 24, 1994; Label: Maragaritaville/MCA Records	5	48	RIAA: Platinum
Barometer Soup	Release date: August 1, 1995; Label: Margaritaville/MCA Records	6	—	RIAA: Gold
Banana Wind	Release date: June 4, 1996; Label: Margaritaville/MCA Records	4	—	RIAA: Platinum
Christmas Island	Release date: October 8, 1996; Label: Margaritaville/MCA Records	27	—	RIAA: Platinum
Don't Stop the Carnival	Release date: April 28, 1998; Label: Margaritaville/Island Records	15	—	RIAA: Gold
Beach House on the Moon	Release date: May 24, 1999; Label: Margaritaville/Island Records	8	—	RIAA: Gold
"—" denotes releases that did not chart

=== 2000s–2020s ===
Title	Album details	Peak chart positions				Certifications
Title	Album details	US	US Country	US Rock	CAN	Certifications
Far Side of the World	Release date: March 19, 2002; Label: Mailboat Records	5	—	—	—	
License to Chill	Release date: July 13, 2004; Label: Mailboat/RCA Nashville	1	1	—	—	RIAA: Platinum
Take the Weather with You	Release date: October 10, 2006; Label: Mailboat/RCA Nashville	4	1	—	—	RIAA: Gold
Buffet Hotel	Release date: December 8, 2009; Label: Mailboat Records	17	—	2	65	
Songs from St. Somewhere	Release date: August 20, 2013; Label: Mailboat Records	4	—	—	22	
'Tis the SeaSon	Release date: October 28, 2016; Label: Mailboat Records	50	6	6	—	
Life on the Flip Side	Release date: May 29, 2020; Label: Mailboat Records	2	1	—	—	
Songs You Don't Know by Heart	Release date: November 27, 2020; Label: Mailboat Records	—	32	—	—	
Equal Strain on All Parts	Release date: November 3, 2023; Label: Mailboat Records	6	2	1	—	
"—" denotes releases that did not chart

== Compilation albums ==
Title	Album details	Peak chart positions		Certifications
Title	Album details	US	US Country	Certifications
Before the Salt	Release date: 1979; Label: Barnaby/Janus	—	—	
Songs You Know by Heart	Release date: October 28, 1985; Label: MCA Records	4	3	RIAA: 7× Platinum
Boats, Beaches, Bars & Ballads (4-disc boxed set)	Release date: 1992; Label: Margaritaville/MCA Records	53	—	RIAA: 4× Platinum
Before the Beach	Release date: May 1993; Label: Margaritaville/MCA Records	169	—	
Margaritaville Cafe: Late Night Menu	Release date: 1993; Label: MCA Records	—	—	
Margaritaville Cafe: Late Night Gumbo	Release date: 1995; Label: Mailboat Records	—	—	
Great American Summer Fun with Jimmy Buffett	Release date: 1996; Label: MCA Records	—	—	
Biloxi	Release date: June 30, 1998; Label: Premium Music	—	—	
Meet Me in Margaritaville: The Ultimate Collection	Release date: April 15, 2003; Label: UTV/MCA/Mailboat Records	9	—	RIAA: 2× Platinum
Now Yer Squawkin'	Release date: March 28, 2005; Label: Recall Records	—	—	
Buried Treasure: Volume One	Release date: November 17, 2017; Label: Mailboat Records	85	—	
"—" denotes releases that did not chart

== Live albums ==
Title	Album details	Peak chart positions			Certifications
Title	Album details	US	US Country	CAN	Certifications
You Had to Be There	Release date: October 1978; Label: ABC Records	72	29	80	RIAA: Gold
Feeding Frenzy: Jimmy Buffett Live!	Release date: October 1990; Label: MCA Records	68	—	—	RIAA: Gold
Buffett Live: Tuesdays, Thursdays, Saturdays	Release date: November 9, 1999; Label: Mailboat Records	37	—	—	RIAA: Gold
Live in Auburn, WA	Release date: November 4, 2003; Label: Mailboat Records	—	—	—	
Live in Las Vegas, NV	Release date: November 2003; Label: Mailboat Records	—	—	—	
Live in Mansfield, MA	Release date: January 2004; Label: Mailboat Records	—	—	—	
Live in Cincinnati, OH	Release date: January 2004; Label: Mailboat Records	—	—	—	
Live in Hawaii	Release date: March 2005; Label: Mailboat Records	66	—	—	
Live at Fenway Park	Release date: November 15, 2005; Label: Mailboat Records	41	—	—	
Live at Texas Stadium (with George Strait and Alan Jackson)	Release date: April 3, 2007; Label: Mailboat Records	11	4	—	
Live in Anguilla	Release date: November 2007; Label: Mailboat Records	54	—	—	
Encores	Release date: April 20, 2010; Label: Mailboat Records	7	—	—	
Volcano (Live 2011)	Release date: September 9, 2011; Label: Mailboat Records	—	—	—	
Welcome to Fin City: Live in Las Vegas	Release date: June 19, 2012; Label: Mailboat Records	—	—	—	
"—" denotes releases that did not chart

== Soundtrack albums ==
Title	Album details
Rancho Deluxe	Release date: 1975; Label: United Artists Records
Hoot	Release date: 2006; Label: Mailboat Records

== Singles ==
=== 1960s and 1970s ===
Year	Single	Peak chart positions							Album
Year	Single	US	US AC	US Country	AUS	CAN	CAN AC	CAN Country	Album
1969	"Abandoned on Tuesday"	—	—	—	—	—	—	—	Non-album single
1970	"The Christian?"	—	—	—	—	—	—	—	Down to Earth
1970	"Ellis Dee (He Ain't Free)"	—	—	—	—	—	—	—	Down to Earth
1970	"Captain America"	—	—	—	—	—	—	—	Down to Earth
1973	"The Great Filling Station Holdup"	—	—	58	—	—	—	—	A White Sport Coat and a Pink Crustacean
1973	"Grapefruit-Juicy Fruit"	—	23	—	—	—	47	—	A White Sport Coat and a Pink Crustacean
1973	"He Went to Paris"	—	—	—	—	—	—	—	A White Sport Coat and a Pink Crustacean
1974	"Saxophones"	— (Note: "Saxophones" did not enter the Hot 100, but peaked at number five on Bubbling Under Hot 100 Singles.)	—	—	—	—	—	—	Living and Dying in ¾ Time
1974	"Come Monday"	30	3	58	19	23	—	—	Living and Dying in ¾ Time
1974	"Pencil Thin Mustache"	— (Note: "Pencil Thin Mustache" did not enter the Hot 100, but peaked at number one on Bubbling Under Hot 100 Singles.)	44	—	99	75	22	—	Living and Dying in ¾ Time
1975	"A Pirate Looks at Forty"	— (Note: "A Pirate Looks at Forty" did not enter the Hot 100, but peaked at number one on Bubbling Under Hot 100 Singles.)	—	—	—	—	—	—	A1A
1975	"Door Number Three"	— (Note: "Door Number Three" did not enter the Hot 100, but peaked at number two on Bubbling Under Hot 100 Singles.)	—	88	—	—	—	—	A1A
1975	"Havana Daydreamin'"	—	—	—	—	—	—	—	Havana Daydreamin'
1976	"The Captain and the Kid"	—	—	—	—	—	—	—	Havana Daydreamin'
1976	"Woman Goin' Crazy on Caroline Street"	—	—	—	—	—	—	—	Havana Daydreamin'
1977	"Margaritaville"	8	1	13	98	4	1	8	Changes in Latitudes, Changes in Attitudes
1977	"Changes in Latitudes, Changes in Attitudes"	37	11	24	—	34	6	21	Changes in Latitudes, Changes in Attitudes
1978	"Cheeseburger in Paradise"	32	—	—	—	27	—	—	Son of a Son of a Sailor
1978	"Livingston Saturday Night"	52	—	91	—	66	25	—	Son of a Son of a Sailor
1978	"Mañana"	84	—	—	—	97	—	—	Son of a Son of a Sailor
1979	"Fins"	35	42	—	100	64	35	62	Volcano
1979	"Dreamsicle"	—	—	—	—	—	—	—	Volcano
1979	"Volcano"	66	43	— (Note: "Volcano" did not enter Hot Country Songs, but peaked at number 22 on Country Digital Song Sales in 2023.)	—	—	1	—	Volcano
1979	"Chanson pour les petits enfants"	—	—	—	—	—	—	—	Volcano
"—" denotes releases that did not chart

=== 1980s ===
Year	Single	Peak chart positions						Album
Year	Single	US	US AC	US Country	US Main. Rock	CAN AC	CAN Country	Album
1980	"Survive"	77	—	—	—	—	10	Volcano
1980	"Hello Texas"	—	—	—	—	—	—	Urban Cowboy
1981	"It's My Job"	57	32	—	51	—	—	Coconut Telegraph
1981	"Stars Fell on Alabama"	—	—	—	—	—	—	Coconut Telegraph
1982	"It's Midnight and I'm Not Famous Yet"	—	—	—	32	—	—	Somewhere Over China
1982	"Where's the Party"	—	—	—	—	—	—	Somewhere Over China
1982	"I Don't Know (Spicoli's Theme)"	—	—	—	—	—	—	Fast Times at Ridgemont High
1983	"One Particular Harbour"	—	22	—	—	4	—	One Particular Harbour
1983	"Brown Eyed Girl"	—	13	—	—	—	—	One Particular Harbour
1984	"When the Wild Life Betrays Me"	—	—	42	—	—	34	Riddles in the Sand
1984	"Bigger Than the Both of Us"	—	—	58	—	—	—	Riddles in the Sand
1984	"Who's the Blonde Stranger?"	—	—	37	—	—	39	Riddles in the Sand
1985	"Gypsies in the Palace"	—	—	56	—	—	—	Last Mango in Paris
1985	"If the Phone Doesn't Ring, It's Me"	—	37	16	—	—	45	Last Mango in Paris
1985	"Christmas in the Caribbean"	—	—	—	—	—	—	Tennessee Christmas
1986	"Please Bypass This Heart"	—	—	50	—	—	—	Last Mango in Paris
1986	"I Love the Now"	—	—	—	—	—	—	Floridays
1986	"Creola"	—	—	—	—	—	—	Floridays
1987	"Take It Back"	—	—	—	—	—	—	Non-album single
1988	"Homemade Music"	—	—	—	—	—	—	Hot Water
1988	"Bring Back the Magic"	—	24	—	—	—	—	Hot Water
1989	"Take Another Road"	—	18	—	—	—	—	Off to See the Lizard
"—" denotes releases that did not chart

=== 1990s–2020s ===
Year	Single	Peak chart positions						Album
Year	Single	US	US AC	US Country	US Rock	CAN	CAN AC	Album
1993	"Another Saturday Night"	—	29	74	—	—	—	Margaritaville Cafe: Late Night Menu
1994	"Fruitcakes"	—	29	—	—	—	—	Fruitcakes
1994	"Frenchman for the Night"	—	—	—	—	—	—	Fruitcakes
1995	"Mexico"	—	25	—	—	50	38	Barometer Soup
1995	"Bank of Bad Habits"	—	—	—	—	—	—	Barometer Soup
1998	"Island Fever"	—	—	—	—	—	—	Don't Stop the Carnival
1999	"Pacing the Cage"	—	—	—	—	—	79	Beach House on the Moon
1999	"I Will Play for Gumbo"	—	—	—	—	—	—	Beach House on the Moon
1999	"Southern Cross" (Live)	— (Note: "Southern Cross" did not chart on the Hot 100, but peaked at number 13 on Digital Songs in 2023.)	—	—	—	—	—	Buffet Live: Tuesday, Thursdays, Saturdays
2002	"Savannah Fare You Well"	—	—	—	—	—	—	Far Side of the World
2002	"Far Side of the World"	—	—	—	—	—	—	Far Side of the World
2004	"Hey, Good Lookin'" (with Clint Black, Kenny Chesney, Alan Jackson, Toby Keith, and George Strait)	63	—	8	—	—	—	License to Chill
2004	"Trip Around the Sun" (with Martina McBride)	— (Note: "Trip Around the Sun" did not enter the Hot 100, but peaked at number 12 on Bubbling Under Hot 100 Singles.)	—	20	—	—	—	License to Chill
2005	"Piece of Work"	—	—	—	—	—	—	License to Chill
2006	"Barefootin'" (with Alan Jackson)	—	—	—	—	—	—	Hoot
2006	"Bama Breeze"	—	—	58	—	—	—	Take the Weather with You
2006	"Here We Are"	—	—	—	—	—	—	Take the Weather with You
2007	"Everybody's on the Phone"	—	—	—	—	—	—	Take the Weather with You
2007	"Getting the Picture"	—	—	—	—	—	—	Non-album single
2009	"Summerzcool"	— (Note: "Summerzcool" did not enter the Hot 100, but peaked at number nine on Bubbling Under Hot 100 Singles.)	—	—	—	—	—	Buffet Hotel
2015	"The Ever Elusive Future"	—	—	—	—	—	—	Non-album single
2023	"Bubbles Up"	—	17	—	45	—	—	Equal Strain on All Parts
"—" denotes releases that did not chart

=== As a featured artist ===
Year	Single	Peak chart positions				Certifications	Album
Year	Single	US	US AC	US Country	CAN	Certifications	Album
1991	"Voices That Care" (Various artists)	11	6	—	61		Non-album single
2003	"It's Five O'Clock Somewhere" (Alan Jackson with Jimmy Buffett)	17	—	1	—	RIAA: 5× Platinum; BPI: Silver; RMNZ: Gold	Greatest Hits Volume II
2011	"Knee Deep" (Zac Brown Band with Jimmy Buffett)	18	—	1	42	CAN: Gold; RIAA: 3× Platinum; RMNZ: Platinum	You Get What You Give
"—" denotes releases that did not chart

== Other charted songs ==
Year	Single	Peak positions		Album
Year	Single	US Digital	US Country	Album
1999	"Margaritaville" (Alan Jackson with Jimmy Buffett)	—	63	Under the Influence
2023	"Why Don't We Get Drunk"	44	— (Note: "Why Don't We Get Drunk" did not enter Hot Country Songs, but peaked at number 20 on Country Digital Song Sales in 2023.)	A White Sport Coat and a Pink Crustacean
2023	"Brown Eyed Girl" (Live)	48	—	Buffett Live: Tuesday, Thursdays, Saturdays
"—" denotes releases that did not chart

== Music videos ==
Year	Video	Director(s)
1973	"Pencil Thin Moustache"	Rick Trow
1973	"Come Monday"	Rick Trow
1973	"He Went to Paris"	Rick Trow
1973	"Nautical Wheelers"	Rick Trow
1983	"Livin' It Up"	Michael Nesmith
1983	"One Particular Harbour"	Frank Martin
1985	"La Vie Dansante"	Michael Nesmith
1985	"Who's the Blonde Stranger"	Rick Bennett
1988	"Homemade Music"	Jeff Stein
1989	"Take Another Road"	Jim Shea
1990	"Jamaica Farewell"	Jim Shea
1991	"Voices That Care" (Various)	David S. Jackson
1993	"Another Saturday Night"	Bret Redman
1994	"Fruitcakes"	Jim Shea
1999	"Changes in Latitudes, Changes in Attitudes"	Stan Kellam/Mike Ramos/Kevin McGrath
1999	"The City"	Mike Ramos
2003	"It's 5 O'Clock Somewhere" (with Alan Jackson)	Trey Fanjoy
2004	"Hey Good Lookin'" (with Clint Black, Kenny Chesney, Alan Jackson, Toby Keith and George Strait)	Trey Fanjoy/Stan Kellam
2004	"Trip Around the Sun" (with Martina McBride)	Trey Fanjoy
2006	"Bama Breeze"	Trey Fanjoy
2011	"Knee Deep" (with Zac Brown Band)	Darren Doane
2013	"Too Drunk to Karaoke" (with Toby Keith)	Michael Salomon
