= Neuffer =

Neuffer is a surname. Notable people with the surname include:

- Angélo Ariitai Neuffer (born 1959), French Polynesian singer-songwriter and guitarist
- Dagobert Neuffer (1851–1939), German stage actor
- Elizabeth Neuffer (1956–2003), American journalist
- Georg Neuffer (1895–1977), German Luftwaffe general
- Heimata Neuffer (?–2020), French Polynesian heavyweight boxer
- Hildegard Neuffer-Stavenhagen (1866–1939), German writer
- Judith Neuffer (born 1948), United States Naval Aviator and NASA administrator
- Taufa Neuffer (born 1978), Tahitian footballer
