= Before the Salt =

Compilation album by Jimmy Buffett
- Released: 1979
- Recorded: 1970, 1971
- Genre: Folk rock
- Length: 76:40
- Label: Barnaby/Janus; 2 BR-6019 (US, 12" x 2)
- Producer: Travis Turk

Professional ratings
Review scores
Source	Rating
AllMusic	3/5 stars

Before the Salt is a compilation album by American popular music singer-songwriter Jimmy Buffett. It includes the entire original releases of his first two albums, Down to Earth and High Cumberland Jubilee with the addition of "Richard Frost" to Down to Earth. It was released on Barnaby/Janus 2 BR-6019 in 1979.

The album has never been issued on compact disc but most of its songs are included on 1993's Before the Beach and all are on the CD releases of Down to Earth and High Cumberland Jubilee.

== Critical reception ==
William Ruhlmann of AllMusic concludes his review with, "On the whole, there are some good songs on this compilation of Buffett's early work, but the music is not characteristic of the lighter tone he eventually took, and potential customers shouldn't buy it expecting his usual style."

== Track listing ==
All tracks are written by Jimmy Buffett, unless otherwise noted

Side one
No.	Title	Writer(s)	Length
1.	"The Christian"	Jimmy Buffett; Milton Brown	3:36
2.	"Ellis Dee"	Jimmy Buffett; Buzz Cason	2:40
3.	"Richard Frost"		3:25
4.	"The Missionary"		3:16
5.	"A Mile High in Denver"		2:55
6.	"The Captain and the Kid"		3:00
Total length:			18:52

Side two
No.	Title	Length
1.	"Captain America"	3:17
2.	"Ain't He A Genius"	2:37
3.	"Turnabout"	4:10
4.	"There's Nothing Soft About Hard Times"	3:07
5.	"I Can't Be Your Hero Today"	2:48
6.	"Truckstop Salvation"	5:45
Total length:		21:44

Side three
No.	Title	Writer(s)	Length
1.	"Ace"		3:12
2.	"Rockefeller Square"	Jimmy Buffett; Buzz Cason	2:16
3.	"Bend A Little"	Jimmy Buffett; Buzz Cason	2:55
4.	"In The Shelter"		3:28
5.	"Death Valley Lives"		3:35
6.	"Livingston's Gone To Texas"		3:45
Total length:			19:11

Side four
No.	Title	Writer(s)	Length
1.	"England"	Jimmy Buffett; Buzz Cason	2:52
2.	"Travelin' Clean"	Jimmy Buffett; Lanny Fiel	3:05
3.	"The Hang-Out Gang"	Jimmy Buffett; Buzz Cason	3:50
4.	"God Don't Own A Car"	Jimmy Buffett; Buzz Cason	1:58
5.	"High Cumberland Jubilee/Comin' Down Slow"	Jimmy Buffett; Buzz Cason	5:08
Total length:			16:53

== Personnel ==
- Jimmy Buffett – Guitar, vocals
- Buzz Cason – Vocals
- Bob Cook – Bass, guitar
- Lanny Fiel – Guitar
- Rick Fiel – Bass
- Sandy Goodrum – Keyboards
- Dave Haney – Bass
- Karl Himmel – Drums
- Don Kloetzke – Vocals
- Paul Tabet – Drums
- Bobby Thompson – Banjo
- Travis Turk – Drums
- Bergen White – Vocals

Track information and credits adapted from the album's liner notes.

== See also ==
- Down to Earth
- High Cumberland Jubilee
