= Barthélémy (singer) =

French Polynesian musician (1956–2015)

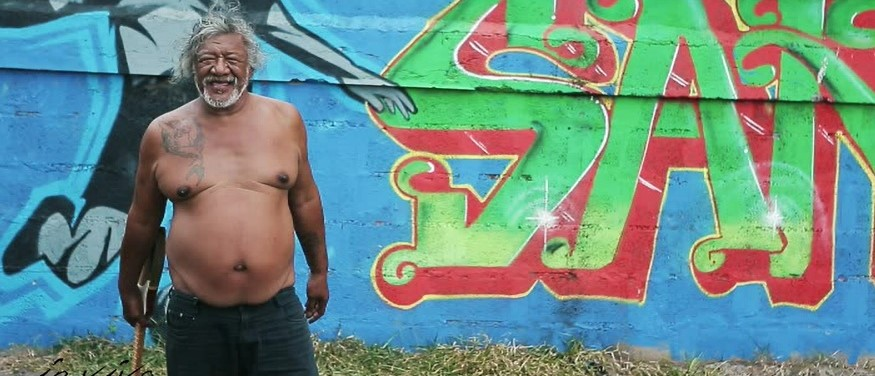
Barthélémy in 2015

Barthélémy Tugarue Arakino or Barthélémy (3 October 1956 — 16 February 2015) was a French Polynesian singer-songwriter, guitarist, and ukulele player. He recorded two hundred songs on fifteen albums during his career, and along with Angelo, Bobby Holcomb, and Jean Gabilou, he was considered one of the most popular Polynesian singers of his generation.

== Biography ==
Barthélémy was born in Papeete on Tahiti from a family originally from Hao in the Tuamotus and grew up in the Outumaoru district of Punaauia. He was influenced by the music of his uncle, Teiti Ganahoa, with whom he sang from the age of ten. His professional career began in 1975, when Alphonse Vanfau, who headed the Studio Alphonse label, decided to produce it.

Barthélémy wrote and composed a good part of his songs. Most of his texts were written in the Tuamotuan language the language spoken in his family, or in Reo Tahiti. He also sang in French or sometimes in English. When they don't talk about love, his texts often address light themes, such as happiness and the sweetness of life. He is known for the joyful and lively nature of his songs, which are readily played in Polynesian "bringues", and quickly acquired the nickname "king" of "kaina" music, the name given to this music so typical of family and popular festivals in French Polynesia.

In June 2005, Barthélémy won the overseas singing competition "9 weeks and 1 day" organized by RFO with one of his great hits "Café de l'amour". This award allows him to perform on the stage of Les Francofolies de La Rochelle in July 2005. In 2008, he collaborated with the very popular Angelo on a duet album, "Fa'ahua Nou Nou". In 2009, he performed at New Morning in the company of other Tahitian singers for an evening of Polynesian music to meet his mainland audience.

In November 2014 he was admitted to the Taaoné Hospital Center in Pirae after contracting the Chikungunya virus. He spent several weeks in a coma, before returning home to be surrounded by his loved ones. On 16 February 2015 he was readmitted to the Taaoné Hospital Center, and died there following respiratory failure caused by the virus.
