= Joma Music Group, Inc. =

Joma Music Group is a music publishing company and record label founded in 2008.

The Joma Music Publishing division represents a large catalog of songs written by the lyricist Ned Washington, including the tracks "My Foolish Heart", "Stella by Starlight", "Rawhide", "I'm Getting Sentimental Over You," and many other songs that have been performed by artists such as Frank Sinatra, Ella Fitzgerald, David Bowie, Miles Davis, Billie Holiday, Barbra Streisand, Bing Crosby, Duke Ellington, Dizzie Gillespie, and K.d. lang.

== Background ==
Joma Music published more than 300 songs from the 1950s–60s by the songwriting team Bernie Baum, Bill Giant and Florence Kaye. Many of the songs were featured in Elvis Presley movies and performed by artists including The Everly Brothers, Bobby Darin, Cliff Richard, and Ben E. King.

The publishing division of Joma Music Group also represents a large selection of indie rock and pop artists from NYC's Williamsburg music scene, many of whom are also signed to the Joma Records label.

Joma Records has released 2 CD compilations so far: Joma Indie Rock & Pop, Vol. 1 which featured songs that have appeared on TV shows such as Castle, Royal Pains, Mercy, Lie To Me, Men in Trees, and Reaper, among others, and the indie rock holiday sampler, A Very Joma Christmas.

A Very Joma Christmas topped the "Best of the Year" lists of holiday records in USA Today, Newsday, and the Minneapolis Star-Tribune. A Very Joma Christmas went on to have song placements on the holiday episodes of network TV shows such as Lie to Me (Fox), and The Young and The Restless (CBS), and it was licensed in its entirety to MTV. Starbucks played songs from A Very Joma Christmas in all their USA locations in December 2010, and songs from the album were played on Absolute Radio and BBC Radio 2 in the UK and daily on Sirius-XM in the USA in December 2010.
