= Songs You Don't Know by Heart =

Studio album by Jimmy Buffett
- Released: November 27, 2020
- Recorded: 2020
- Genre: Country rock; Gulf and Western
- Length: 59:37
- Label: Mailboat
- Producer: Mac McAnally

Jimmy Buffett chronology
Life on the Flip Side (2020)	Songs You Don't Know by Heart (2020)	Equal Strain on All Parts (2023)

Songs You Don't Know by Heart is the thirty-first studio album by American singer-songwriter Jimmy Buffett, released on November 27, 2020. This was the last studio album to be released in Buffett's lifetime before his death in 2023.

== Background ==
The album comprises new acoustic recordings of songs previously recorded by Buffett. The album was recorded based on an online video series recorded by Buffett, where he would perform lesser-known songs from his catalogue, as chosen by online fan vote. The video series was filmed and directed by Buffett's daughter Delaney, amidst the COVID-19 pandemic. The title of the album is a play on (and contrast to) Buffett's 1985 greatest hits album, Songs You Know by Heart.

== Track listing ==
All tracks are written by Jimmy Buffett, except where noted.

Track list
No.	Title	Writer(s)	Original album	Length
1.	"I Have Found Me a Home"		A White Sport Coat and a Pink Crustacean	3:47
2.	"Woman Goin' Crazy on Caroline Street"	Buffett, Steve Goodman	Havaña Daydreamin'	4:10
3.	"The Captain and the Kid"		Down to Earth; and later re-recorded for Havaña Daydreamin', and again for Meet Me in Margaritaville	3:33
4.	"Delaney Talks to Statues"		Fruitcakes	3:21
5.	"Twelve Volt Man"		One Particular Harbour	3:40
6.	"Peanut Butter Conspiracy"		A White Sport Coat and a Pink Crustacean	4:08
7.	"Something So Feminine About a Mandolin"	Buffett, Jane Slagsvol	Havaña Daydreamin'	3:36
8.	"Love in the Library"	Buffett, McAnally	Fruitcakes	4:32
9.	"Chanson Pour les Petits Enfants"		Volcano	3:58
10.	"The Night I Painted the Sky"	Buffett, Russ Kunkel, Jay Oliver, Roger Guth, and Peter Mayer	Barometer Soup	5:21
11.	"Cowboy in the Jungle"		Son of a Son of a Sailor	5:15
12.	"Little Miss Magic"		Coconut Telegraph	4:03
13.	"Tin Cup Chalice"		A1A	3:14
14.	"Tonight I Just Need My Guitar"	Buffett, McAnally	Far Side of the World	2:44
15.	"Death of an Unpopular Poet"		A White Sport Coat and a Pink Crustacean	4:15

== Charts ==
Chart performance for Songs You Don't Know by Heart
Chart (2020)	Peak position
US Top Country Albums (Billboard)	32
