= Before the Beach =

Compilation album by Jimmy Buffett
- Released: May 1993
- Recorded: 1970, 1971
- Genre: Folk rock
- Length: 70:00
- Label: MCA; MCAD-10823 (US, CD)
- Producer: Travis Turk

Professional ratings
Review scores
Source	Rating
AllMusic	2/5 stars

Before the Beach is a compilation album by American popular music singer-songwriter Jimmy Buffett. It includes the entire original releases of his first two albums, Down to Earth and High Cumberland Jubilee except for "The Christian?" and "Ain't He a Genius" (from Down to Earth) but with the addition of "Cumberland High Dilemma" which was recorded for but not included on the original High Cumberland Jubilee album. Before the Beach was released in May 1993 on MCA 10823 and was the first compact disc of material from Down to Earth and High Cumberland Jubilee. It is the only collection of those albums' material to appear on the music charts, reaching No. 169 on the Billboard 200 in 1993.

== Track listing ==
All tracks are written by Jimmy Buffett, unless otherwise noted.

No.	Title	Writer(s)	Length
1.	"Ellis Dee"	Jimmy Buffett; Buzz Cason	2:44
2.	"The Missionary"		3:28
3.	"A Mile High in Denver"		2:59
4.	"The Capitan and the Kid"		3:08
5.	"Capitan America"		3:18
6.	"Turnabout"		4:14
7.	"There's Nothin' Soft About Hard Times"		3:16
8.	"I Can't Be Your Hero Today"		2:53
9.	"Truckstop Salvation"		5:45
10.	"Ace"		3:08
11.	"Rockefeller Square"	Jimmy Buffett; Buzz Cason	2:14
12.	"Bend A Little"	Jimmy Buffett; Buzz Cason	3:30
13.	"In The Shelter"		3:28
14.	"Death Valley Lives"		3:34
15.	"Livingston's Gone To Texas"		3:32
16.	"England"	Jimmy Buffett; Buzz Cason	2:49
17.	"Travelin' Clean"		2:51
18.	"The Hang-Out Gang"	Jimmy Buffett; Buzz Cason	3:38
19.	"God Don't Own A Car"	Jimmy Buffett; Buzz Cason	1:57
20.	"High Cumberland Jubilee/Comin' Down Slow"	Jimmy Buffett; Buzz Cason	4:15
21.	"Cumberland High Dilemma"	Jimmy Buffett; Buzz Cason	3:19
Total length:			70:00

== Personnel ==
- Jimmy Buffett – vocals, guitar, kazoo
- Lanny Fiel – guitar, piano
- Bob Cook – guitar, harmonica, bass
- Bobby Thompson – banjo
- Bergen White – trombone
- Buzz Cason – keyboards, background vocals
- Randy Goodrum – keyboards
- Rick Fiel – bass
- Dave Haney – bass
- Travis Turk – drums, kazoo
- Karl Himmel – drums
- Paul Tabet – drums
- Don Kloetzke – background vocals

Track information and credits adapted the album's liner notes.

== See also ==
- Down to Earth
- High Cumberland Jubilee
- Down to Earth and High Cumberland Jubilee compilations
