= Mike Smith (singer-songwriter) =

American singer-songwriter

Larry Michael Smith was born on October 3,1939, and lived in several small towns in Kansas before moving to Hollywood in 1958.

Smith first appeared on Decca Records in 1960 with a rockabilly backbeat song, "Sara Ruth" which was written as a joke for a high school friend. The other side of the record, "Week of Loneliness," had a limited success in the Bay Area of California and in his adopted home town of Stockton, it was number one. In April, 1959, Billboard chose the record as a Billboard Pick.

In 1962, Smith had a release on Era Records of "By the Time You Read This Letter" b/w "That's What I'd Do", which were recorded in the Gold Star Studios of Hollywood, the inventors of flanging and phasing.

Two originals were self-produced at the Oro Records studio in Modesto, California: "The Meaning of Love" b/w "Pretty Little Baby" with vocal backing by The Terrys, a four girl group from Stockton, California.

Smith had independent releases on the label Orchid of Memphis, owned by Prewitt Rose: "Pictures" b/w "Lightin' Up Behind The Barn", recording as Smith and Morales, session at Gardnerville, NV; "Love Of An Everyday Man" b/w "Country Rock and Roll" as Carson Smith, co-written with Prewitt Rose, session in Lexington, Kentucky.

On his own label Smith recorded "Arkansas River" b/w "Son of the Other Gun" with Terry Mort, drums, and Bob Bales, bass, session Tulsa, Oklahoma.

Smith pursued writing and performing and any opportunity to record. In 1980 one of his compositions, "We Have So Much To Give", was the California State Theme Song for The Council on Aging. During Smith's career he was managed by Abe Olman, Fred Stryker and Prewitt Rose. Smith now lives in Coffeyville, Kansas and continues to write and record.
