= One Particular Harbour (song) =

Single by Jimmy Buffett

from the album One Particular Harbour
- B-side: "Distantly in Love"
- Released: October 1983
- Recorded: 1983
- Genre: Pop rock, country, Gulf and Western
- Label: MCA
- Songwriter(s): Jimmy Buffett, Bobby Holcomb
- Producer(s): Jimmy Buffett, Michael Utley

Jimmy Buffett singles chronology
"I Don't Know (Spicoli's Theme)" (1982)	"One Particular Harbour" (1983)	"Brown Eyed Girl" (1983)

Audio sample
- file; help

"One Particular Harbour" is a song performed by American popular music singer-songwriter Jimmy Buffett. It was written by Jimmy Buffett and Hawaiian-born Tahitian musician Bobby Holcomb and released as a single (b/w "Distantly In Love") on MCA 52298 in October 1983.

It was first released on his 1983 album One Particular Harbour and reached No. 22 on the Billboard Adult Contemporary chart.

The song begins with lyrics in Tahitian:

Ia ora te natura
E mea arofa teie ao nei

The translation given is:

"Nature lives (life to nature)
Have pity for the Earth (Love the Earth)"

It concludes with the same verse plus:

Ua pau te maitai no te fenua
Re zai noa ra te ora o te mitie

This is translated as:

"Bounty of the land is exhausted
But there's still abundance on the sea."

Buffett has said in radio interviews about the song that he wrote it while travelling the islands and that he was moved to write it one afternoon during his journeys, as he sat on the balcony of his hotel room watching the local children (memorialized in the lyric "Where children play on the shore each day").

"One Particular Harbour" is one of Buffett's more popular songs with fans, and was played at almost all of his concerts. Recorded live versions of the song appear on Feeding Frenzy, Buffett Live: Tuesdays, Thursdays, Saturdays, and the video Live by the Bay. Two recordings are included on the 2007 release Live in Anguilla: once in full concert mode at the Dune Preserve beach bar and another the day before in an impromptu "unplugged" concert on the beach. While visiting Tahiti in 1983, Buffett recorded a music video for the song with assistance from the film crew for the film The Bounty, including the ship used in the film and Mel Gibson's character costume.

It is often performed with extensive steel drum played by the Coral Reefer Band's pannist Robert Greenidge.

== Chart performance ==
Chart (1983)	Peak position
U.S. Billboard Hot Adult Contemporary Tracks	22
Canadian RPM Adult Contemporary Tracks	4
