= 'Tis the SeaSon =

Studio album by Jimmy Buffett
- Released: October 28, 2016
- Recorded: Summer 2016 amidst touring.
- Genre: Christmas, Country
- Length: 39:31
- Label: Mailboat
- Producer: Mac McAnally • Michael Utley

Jimmy Buffett chronology
Songs from St. Somewhere (2013)	'Tis the SeaSon (2016)	Life on the Flip Side (2020)

Professional ratings
Review scores
Source	Rating
Allmusic	3.5/5 stars

'Tis the SeaSon is the second and final Christmas album by American singer-songwriter Jimmy Buffett, as well as his twenty-ninth studio album overall.

== Background ==
Released on October 28, 2016, it is the follow-up to Buffett's Christmas Island, released twenty years prior. After the recording of the album was mentioned in interviews and on social media throughout summer 2016, the name, album cover, and release date were officially announced on September 26, 2016.

== Commercial performance ==
The album debuted on Billboard 200 at No. 50, and at the Top Country Albums at No. 6, selling 10,000 copies in its first week. The album has sold 56,500 copies in the United States as of December 2016.

== Track listing ==
No.	Title	Writer(s)	Length
1.	"Wonderful Christmastime"	Paul McCartney	4:00
2.	"Jingle Bell Rock"	Joe Beal, Jim Boothe	2:10
3.	"All I Want for Christmas Is My Two Front Teeth"	Donald Yetter Gardner	2:39
4.	"Drivin' the Pig (Manejando el Cerdo)"	Jimmy Buffett, Roger Guth, Peter Mayer	3:47
5.	"The Twelve Days of Christmas (Parrothead Version)"		3:50
6.	"What I Didn't Get for Christmas"	Mac McAnally	2:36
7.	"Rockin' Around the Christmas Tree"	Johnny Marks	2:04
8.	"Rudolph the Red-Nosed Reindeer"	Marks	3:32
9.	"Santa Stole Thanksgiving"	Buffett, Guth, Mayer	2:35
10.	"Mele Kalikimaka" (feat. Jake Shimabukuro)	Robert Alexander Anderson	2:39
11.	"Winter Wonderland" (feat. Robert Greenidge)	Richard B. Smith	3:20
12.	"Baby, It's Cold Outside" (feat. Nadirah Shakoor)	Frank Loesser	2:54
13.	"White Christmas"	Irving Berlin	3:10
Total length:			39:31

== Personnel ==
Credits from AllMusic.

- Jimmy Buffett – All vocals
- Robert Greenidge – Featured artist
- Mac McAnally – Producer
- Nadirah Shakoor – Featured artist
- Jake Shimabukuro – Featured artist
- Michael Utley – Producer

== Charts ==
=== Weekly charts ===
Chart (2016)	Peak position
US Billboard 200	50
US Top Country Albums (Billboard)	6
US Top Rock Albums (Billboard)	6

=== Year-end charts ===
Chart (2017)	Position
US Top Country Albums (Billboard)	74
US Top Rock Albums (Billboard)	77
