= Equal Strain on All Parts =

Studio album by Jimmy Buffett
- Released: November 3, 2023
- Recorded: 2022–2023
- Length: 52:55
- Labels: Mailboat; Sun
- Producers: Mac McAnally; Michael Utley

Jimmy Buffett chronology
Songs You Don't Know by Heart (2020)	Equal Strain on All Parts (2023)

Singles from Equal Strain on All Parts
- 1. "Bubbles Up" Released: September 8, 2023

Equal Strain on All Parts is the thirty-second studio album by American singer-songwriter Jimmy Buffett. It is the final album to be completed prior to his death on September 1, 2023, and was released on November 3, 2023, through Mailboat and Sun Records.

== Background ==
After the release of Jimmy Buffett's 2020 album Life on the Flip Side, he continued to tour in support of his music. However, privately, he had been diagnosed with Merkel cell carcinoma, a rare but aggressive form of skin cancer, something he would fight for four years. Buffett still continued to tour and write new music, though hospitalization in 2022 and 2023 would cause him to postpone or cancel some shows. Buffett worked on recording the new album up through 2023, and completed it prior to his death on September 1, 2023.

== Themes and composition ==
The title of the album, Equal Strain on All Parts, comes from a saying his grandfather would use to describe "a good nap". The track "My Gummie Just Kicked In" was described as a surf rock song about a woman's experience of eating a cannabis edible at a summer dinner party. The song was inspired by a real life event attended by Buffett, his wife Jane Buffett, Paul McCartney, and his wife Nancy Shevell. Buffett was concerned about Shevell at a dinner party, and her response to his question about her well-being was simply the title of the song. They all joked that the experience would make for a good song, and Buffett later followed through on writing it, even including McCartney on bass guitar on the final recording. The track "Bubbles Up" was described as a "reflective ballad" that was co-written with singer-songwriter and guitarist Will Kimbrough. McCartney, who discussed the song with Buffett prior to his death, explained that the song's meaning was derived from common advice given to sailors and other people who may find themselves unexpectedly thrown into a body of water from a boat. McCartney explained that Buffett "turned a diving phrase that is used to train people underwater into a metaphor for life when you're confused and don't know where you are just follow the bubbles—they'll take you up to the surface and straighten you out right away." He also considered Buffett's vocal performance on the song to be the best in his career. Michael Utley and Mac McAnally, two members of Buffett's backing band – the Coral Reefer Band – produced the album.

The album contains three cover songs. "Like My Dog" was originally recorded by Billy Currington for his 2010 album Enjoy Yourself, from which it was released as the fourth single. Written by Harley Allen and Scotty Emerick, the song is about a man wishing a woman would love him as loyally and enthusiastically as his own dog. "Columbus", written by Noel Brazil for Mary Black's 1989 album No Frontiers and then later covered by David Crosby on his 1993 solo album Thousand Roads. The album closer is a recording of Bob Dylan's "Mozambique", featuring Emmylou Harris who reprises her background vocal from the original recording.

== Release and promotion ==
The album was released on November 3, 2023. Prior to his death, across July and August 2023, Buffett had teased clips of songs on social media, and had revealed a new song each Friday on his Radio Margaritaville radio show. On September 8, 2023, three songs were released ahead of the album release, "Bubbles Up", "My Gummie Just Kicked In", and "Like My Dog". "Bubbles Up" is also the album's lead single.

== Track listing ==
Equal Strain on All Parts track listing
No.	Title	Writer(s)	Length
1.	"University of Bourbon Street" (featuring Preservation Hall Jazz Band)	Buffett; Will Kimbrough	4:19
2.	"Bubbles Up"	Buffett; Kimbrough	4:46
3.	"Audience of One"	Buffett; Mac McAnally; Erin McAnally; Mick Utley	3:22
4.	"My Gummie Just Kicked In" (featuring Paul McCartney)	Buffett; Tina Gullickson; Roger Guth; Peter Mayer	3:27
5.	"Close Calls"	Buffett; Kimbrough; M. McAnally	3:05
6.	"Equal Strain on All Parts"	Buffett; M. McAnally	3:24
7.	"Like My Dog"	Harley Allen; Scotty Emerick	2:36
8.	"Ti Punch Café" (featuring Angelique Kidjo)	Buffett; Pierre Edoard Decimus; Jacob Felix Desvarieux; Angélique Kidjo; Kimbrough	3:56
9.	"Portugal or PEI" (featuring Lennie Gallant and Will Kimbrough)	Buffett; Lenny Gallant; Kimbrough; M. McAnally	4:05
10.	"Nobody Works on Friday"	Buffett; E. McAnally; Mick Utley	3:37
11.	"Fish Porn"	Buffett; Carl Hiaasen; M. McAnally	4:20
12.	"Johnny's Rhum"	Buffett; Gallant; M. McAnally	4:22
13.	"Columbus"	Noel Brazil	4:20
14.	"Mozambique" (featuring Emmylou Harris)	Bob Dylan; Jacques Levy	3:16
Total length:			52:55

== Personnel ==
- Jimmy Buffett – vocals, guitar
- The Coral Reefer Band – instrumentation
- Paul McCartney – bass guitar on "My Gummie Just Kicked In"
- Emmylou Harris – vocals on "Mozambique"
- Angelique Kidjo – vocals on "Ti Punch Cafe"
- Michael Utley – production
- Mac McAnally – production

== Charts ==
=== Weekly charts ===
Weekly chart performance for Equal Strain on All Parts
Chart (2023)	Peak position
UK Album Downloads (Official Charts)	42
US Billboard 200	6
US Independent Albums (Billboard)	2
US Top Country Albums (Billboard)	2
US Top Rock Albums (Billboard)	1

=== Year-end charts ===
Year-end chart performance for Equal Strain on All Parts
Chart (2024)	Position
US Top Country Albums (Billboard)	68
