= Évrard Chaussoy =

Evrard Chaussoy
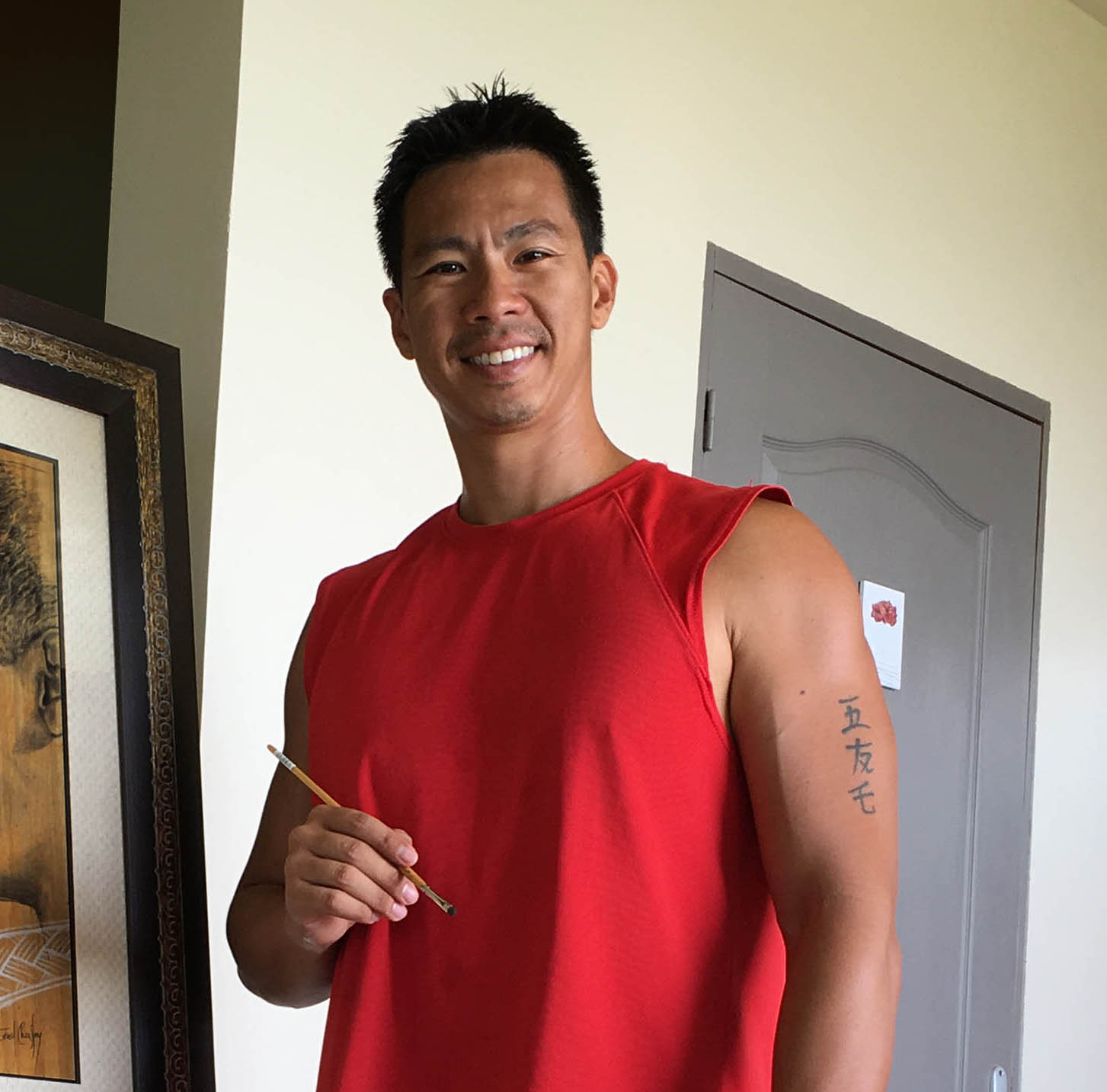
- Evrard Chaussoy in 2017
- Born: October 15, 1980 (age 46); Uturoa, Raiatea French Polynesia
- Occupations: Artist; painter; sculptor
- Years active: 2002–present
- Honors: Special prize Société nationale des beaux-arts (Salon 2007)

Signature
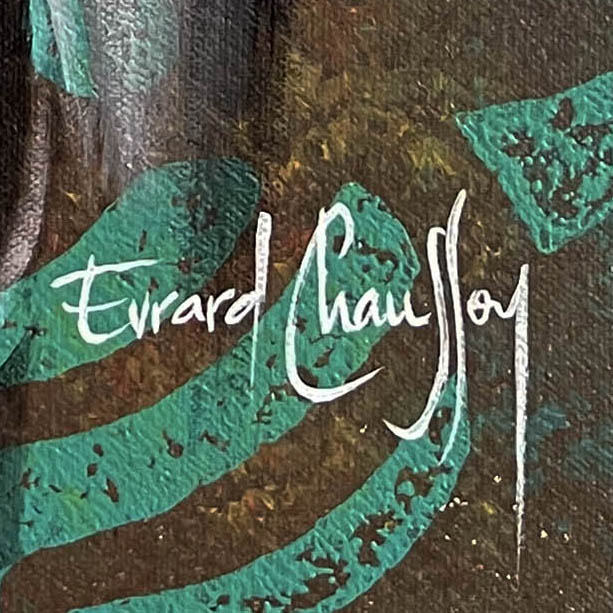

Évrard Chaussoy (born 15 October 1980) is a French Polynesian painter and sculptor.

== Biography ==
Chaussoy was born in Uturoa on the island of Raiatea. He is the youngest of five children of Chinese origin. His grandparents left China to work in the cotton fields in French Polynesia. His father Joseph Chaussoy was a painter and his mother Marguerite was a seamstress. His father, while he was still a child, met the painter Adrian Herman Gouwe who gave him a taste for painting and had a great influence on his pictorial style. Évrard grew up in the family business Arii Création, a textile printing company and became aware of art very early by following his father in his workshops where he met many artists. Évrard Chaussoy, very early on, showed a predisposition to drawing and painting. Rather a good student, he was destined to continue his studies in mainland France to enter the fine arts but being uprooted frightened him and against the advice of his parents, Évrard remained in Polynesia.

In 1998 he joined the family business as a designer where he worked until 2010. During this period Chaussoy honed his artistic sense with traditional Polynesian patterns and color harmonies. He eventually rose to the position of artistic director and created numerous textile, clothing, and uniform collections for different hotels and airlines in French Polynesia.

In 2002, encouraged by his father Joseph, Chaussoy participated in his first group exhibition. A charity exhibition initiated by the Chinese Philanthropic School of Tahiti, one of the oldest Chinese cultural associations in French Polynesia, part of the profits of which are donated to the association. His first individual exhibition took place in 2004 at the gallery at the easel in Papeete.

From then on, Évrard presented his work there every year and built a name and a reputation in the Polynesian artistic circle, until obtaining the special jury prize during his first participation in the salon of the Société Nationale des Beaux-Arts at the Carrousel du Louvre in 2007. In 2010, Chaussoy left the family business and diversified. He joined a sporting goods manufacturing company, for which he was artistic director, designed product collections and advertisements. The same year he created a sign manufacturing company. His various professional activities took him away from the gallery walls and Chaussoy was forced to take a break from his career as an artist.

In 2013, his father Joseph had a second stroke which left him with serious after-effects. Aphasia and hemiplegia prevented him from painting . In 2015, his younger brother Gilbert killed himself. This began a difficult period for the artist. Gilbert and Évrard were the only two brothers who shared this passion for painting and Joseph, very weakened, could no longer paint. Chaussoy felt invested with a responsibility, that of perpetuating the family tradition of painting and after two years of reflection, he decided to leave everything to devote himself only to Art.

== Artistic style ==
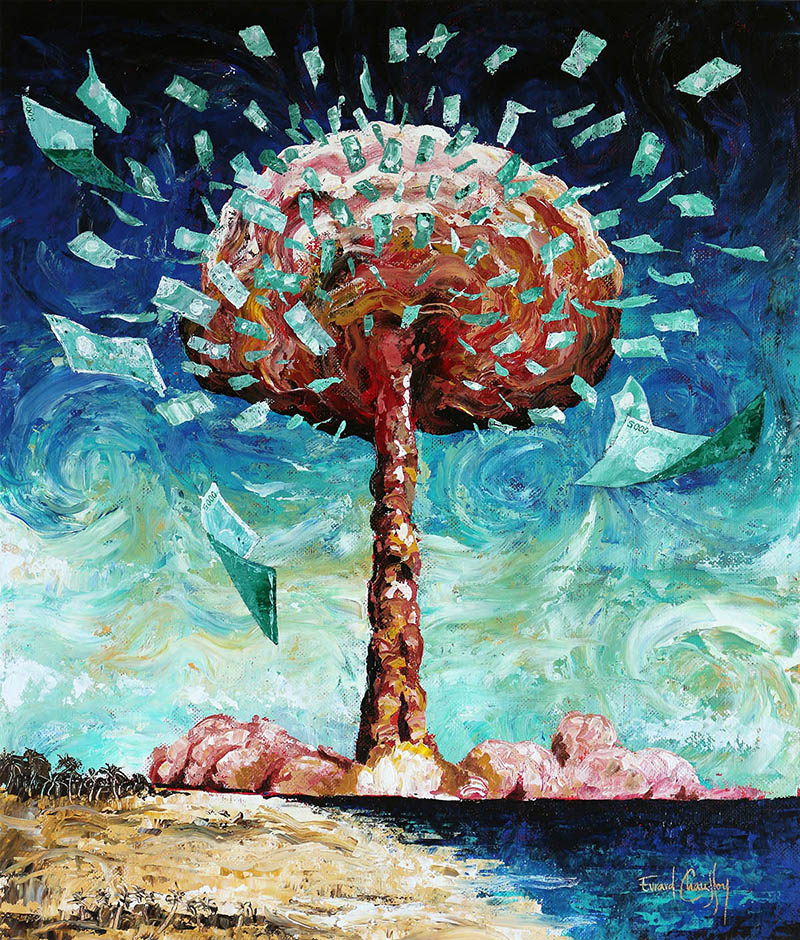
Moruru roa

Chaussoy's return to the Polynesian artistic scene was well received by the public. He had previously presented charcoal or black chalk drawings in a realistic style, but since his return offered paintings on canvas in a figurative and impressionist style and devoted himself to painting with a knife and also to the traditional method as well, called “Woodblock”.

Although usually representing scenes of traditional Polynesian life, Chaussoy also takes positions on current issues and uses his painting to convey messages. In 2018, he painted the satirical work entitled “Moruru roa”, a play on words between “Moruroa” (an atoll used by the French for nuclear testing) and “Mauruuru roa” (“Thank you very much” in Reo Tahiti). He is also committed to the environment by denouncing maritime pollution with his series of paintings “Coming from the sea”, “Paradise on borrowed time” where he illustrates the threat of rising water levels and his participation in World Art Day for the exhibition “Water Peoples”.

He also created the sculpture of a four-meter giant turtle submerged in the lagoon of the island of Taha'a as an artificial reef. Corals will grow on its shell.

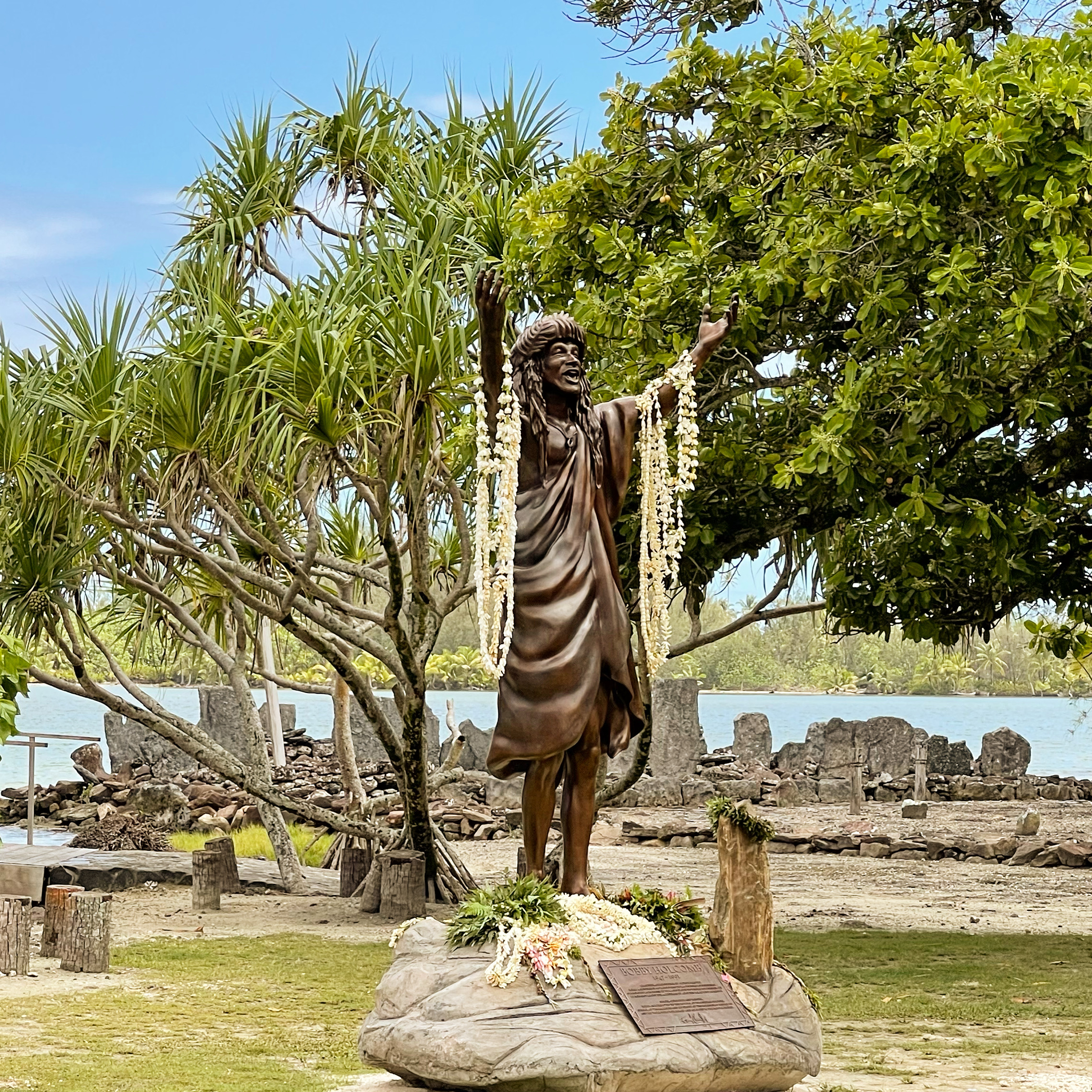
Statue of Bobby Holcomb.

In 2021 with the help and financial support of his friend Heiarii Girard, Chaussoy created a statue of the famous Polynesian musician Bobby Holcomb in bronze. The monumental 1.5 scale statue and its base measure three and a half meters and weigh three and a half tonnes. It was inaugurated on the island of Huahine where Bobby resided then was exhibited on the island of Raiatea where the singer regularly performed. It is currently exhibited on Place To'ata in Papeete, on the island of Tahiti.

In 2023, he wins access to the Artist Residence Program at the International city of the Arts in Paris.

In 2024, the government of French Polynesia commissions him to sculpt a bronze statue of Vehiatua i te mata’i, a monument created to honor a Polynesian surfing hero and celebrate the opening ceremony of the 2024 Paris Olympic Games at the site of Teahupo’o.

In 2025, Evrard Chaussoy sculpted a bust of the "Polynesian Marianne," which was presented to Gérard Larcher, President of the Senate. The work subsequently entered the Senate's art collection in Paris and is displayed in the conference room. This representation, recognized as the first indigenous allegorical figure from the French overseas territories, is interpreted as a milestone in the acknowledgment of local identities within the French nation.

== Honors ==
- Special prize, 2007 show, Société Nationale des Beaux-Arts, Carrousel du Louvre, Paris
