= Margaritaville Cafe: Late Night =

Margaritaville Cafe: Late Night is the name of a series of three compilation albums by singers and bands that performed at various Margaritaville Cafes, commercial ventures of American singer-songwriter Jimmy Buffett. The first two albums, Margaritaville Cafe: Late Night Menu and Margaritaville Cafe: Late Night Gumbo feature studio recordings including three and two songs respectively by Buffett. The third album, Margaritaville Cafe: Late Night Live, was recorded live at Margaritaville Cafe New Orleans and is credited to Club Trini, a duo of Michael Utley and Robert Greenidge, two members of Buffett's Coral Reefer Band, with other Coral Reefers such as Nadirah Shakoor. Buffett also appears on the album.

== Margaritaville Cafe: Late Night Menu ==
Margaritaville Cafe: Late Night Menu features studio recordings by singers and bands that performed at Margaritaville Cafe in Key West, Florida. It was released in 1993 on MCA 10824 and has a running time of 71:23.

Margaritaville: Late Night Menu track listing
No.	Title	Writer(s)	Artist(s)	Length
1.	"Eanna's Socatash"	Nicole Yarling	Amy Lee & Nicky Yarling	3:49
2.	"I Walk Alone"	Andrew Berlin, Kim Frederick, Robert Richardson, Bob Ronco	Rockerfellas	3:17
3.	"Morning Glory"	Deanna Bogart	Deanna Bogart	2:41
4.	"Lost Boy"	Tim Krekel, Greg "Fingers" Taylor	Greg "Fingers" Taylor	3:19
5.	"Club 15"	Jimmy Nace	The Nace Brothers	3:28
6.	"Conch Soca"	E.R. Allen	The Survivors	3:17
7.	"Another Saturday Night"	Sam Cooke	Jimmy Buffett	3:10
8.	"Everything I Say"	Jim Muller, Bob Ronco	Rockerfellas	2:15
9.	"India"	Roger Guth, Jim Mayer, Peter Mayer	PM	4:29
10.	"Pan Classique In B Minor (Mad Music)"	Robert Greenidge	Michael Utley, Robert Greenidge	4:00
11.	"Some White People Can Dance"	Jimmy Buffett, Tim Krekel, Greg "Fingers" Taylor, Michael Utley	Greg "Fingers" Taylor	4:03
12.	"Great Big Fanny"	Bill Wharton	Bill Wharton "Sauce Boss"	3:27
13.	"Hurtin' Kind"	Nicole Yarling	Little Nicky & The Slicks	3:25
14.	"Let The Big Dog Eat"	Bill Wharton	Bill Wharton "Sauce Boss"	2:35
15.	"Do Nothin' Man, (Don't No Woman Want A)"	Nicole Yarling	Little Nicky & The Slicks	3:56
16.	"Sugartown Shakedown"	Amy Lee	Amy Lee & Nicky Yarling	4:22
17.	"Reggae Accident"	Lucas P. Gravell	Jimmy Buffett	4:55
18.	"Key Lime Squeeze"	James Allen	The Survivors	4:07
19.	"Coco Loco"	Michael Utley	Michael Utley, Robert Greenidge	3:34
20.	"Souvenirs"	Vince Melamed, Danny O'Keefe	Jimmy Buffett	3:14
Total length:				71:23

== Margaritaville Cafe: Late Night Gumbo ==
Margaritaville Cafe: Late Night Gumbo features studio recordings by singers and bands that performed at Margaritaville Cafe in New Orleans, Louisiana. The two songs performed by Jimmy Buffett on this release, "Sea Cruise" and "Goodnight Irene", include backing musicians Mike Utley, Tim Krekel, and Michael Organ. It was released in 1995 on Margaritaville 535012 and has a running time of 54:55.

Margaritaville Cafe: Late Night Gumbo track listing
No.	Title	Writer(s)	Artist(s)	Length
1.	"Don't Stop"	Philip Frazier	Rebirth Brass Band	3:43
2.	"Please Don't Leave Me"	Fats Domino	Rockin' Dopsie Jr.	3:08
3.	"I'm Going Down To Bourbon Street"	Waylon Thibodeaux	Waylon Thibodeaux	3:35
4.	"Eatin' With Fingers"	Joe Cabral	The Iguanas	3:31
5.	"Sea Cruise"	Huey "Piano" Smith	Jimmy Buffett	3:34
6.	"Stringbean"	Steve LeBlanc, Mark Meaux	Bluerunners	3:44
7.	"I'm Coming Home"	Clifton Chenier	Rockin' Dopsie Jr.	4:06
8.	"Come Back Baby"	Waylon Thibodeaux	Waylon Thibodeaux	3:03
9.	"Why Ya Whit Me"	Ajay Mallery, Roderick Paulin	Rebirth Brass Band	3:54
10.	"Canecutter"	Clifton Chenier	Bluerunners	4:23
11.	"Here's To Love"	Clay Courville, Waylon Thibodeaux	Waylon Thibodeaux	3:30
12.	"Popeye's A Hubigs"	Ricky Oliverez, Jumpin' Johnny Sansone	Jumpin' Johnny Sansone	2:37
13.	"Got You On My Mind"	Howard Biggs, Joe "Cornbread" Thomas	The Iguanas	4:30
14.	"Blue Co."	Mark Meaux	Bluerunners	3:07
15.	"Goodnight Irene"	Leadbelly, John A. Lomax	Jimmy Buffett	4:30
Total length:				54:55

== Margaritaville Cafe: Late Night Live ==
Margaritaville Cafe: Late Night Live was recorded live at Margaritaville Cafe in New Orleans, Louisiana, and was released in 2000 on Mailboat 2001 with a running time of 64:28. It is credited to Club Trini which includes Robert Greenridge (steel drums) and Michael Utley (keyboards) as well as Peter Mayer (vocals, guitar), Nadirah Shakoor (vocals), Jim Mayer (bass, background vocals), Roger Guth (drums), Ralph MacDonald (percussion), all members of Jimmy Buffett's Coral Reefer Band. Buffett himself sang and played guitar on some tracks as well. The album was produced by Utley and Greenridge.

Margaritaville Cafe: Late Night Live track listing
No.	Title	Writer(s)	Length
1.	"Viajero"	Michael Utley	6:15
2.	"Club Trini (Back in Town)"	Robert Greenidge	6:51
3.	"Soltar"	Michael Utley	6:06
4.	"Paradise Garden"	Robert Greenidge	4:11
5.	"Party Time"	Robert Greenidge	5:50
6.	"African Friend"	Jimmy Buffett	3:19
7.	"Jimmy's Intro"		1:20
8.	"Come on In"	Jimmy Buffett, Ralph MacDonald, Bill Salter	5:04
9.	"Cairo"	Johnny Candoso	3:55
10.	"New Orleans Medley: Storyville Parade/Ya Ya Yumbo/Shango"	Michael Utley	3:52
11.	"Sweet Heat"	Michael Utley	7:46
12.	"Madd Music"	Robert Greenidge	3:34
13.	"No Woman, No Cry"	Vincent Ford, Bob Marley	6:25
Total length:			64:28

== See also ==
- Jimmy Buffett discography
