= Angélo Ariitai Neuffer =

Angélo Ariitai Neuffer or Angelo (born 3 January 1959) is a French Polynesian singer-songwriter and guitarist. He is one of the most prolific Polynesian singers: to date, he has written and composed over two hundred original songs and released sixteen solo albums and four duo albums. With Barthélémy, Bobby Holcomb and Jean Gabilou, he is considered one of the most popular Polynesian singers of his generation.

== Biography ==
Neuffer was born on Raiatea in the Society Islands. He became interested in music very early on. From the age of eight, he entered singing competitions and won numerous first prizes, and quickly had the desire to compose, write and perform his own songs.

In 1984, his first album "Manureva Teie" was released, today distributed under the name "1er Album", which sold 2,000 copies. Three years later, in 1987, he released his second album "Turamarama Te Fenua Nei" which sold 20,000 copies, which placed him in the league of the great Polynesian singers.

At the end of the 1980s, he met another Polynesian singer from Hawaii, Bobby Holcomb (better known in French Polynesia as "Bobby"), who became his friend, with whom he released an album "Bobby Angelo" in 1988. Bobby's death in 1991 led Angelo to continue most of his career solo. However, he collaborated on projects with Michel Poroi and Barthélémy, two very popular singers in French Polynesia.

In 2008, Angelo participated in the "L'Eté tahitien" festival in Quéven. In 2013, he returned to his mainland audience during a tour which he began again at the Quéven festival, before performing in Toulon, at the “Heiva” festival in Saint-Mandrier, in Biscarrosse and in Paris. In 2014, he celebrated thirty years of his career.

Angelo began his career at Océane Production. After the company folded in 2003, he joined forces with Mac Music Paradise. However, one of his last albums "Faehau No Te Fenua" was recorded and produced in 2011 by Ras Tea Prod.

Most of the songs performed by Angelo are written and composed by him. The texts are almost all written in Reo Tahiti. He sometimes collaborated with other authors on songs written in Marquesan or Hawaiian. His texts speak as much of love and fraternity, as of the preservation of nature and protection of the environment or of social justice and the affirmation of Polynesian identity. His song entitled "Hau Metua Roma" from the album "Atire Atire" was highlighted in a study on the social situation in French Polynesia, published by the University of Hawaii Press. His music is most often influenced by rock and sometimes by reggae, even if some of his songs can also be Tahitian waltzes or if the orchestrations can sometimes use traditional Polynesian instruments, ukulele, pahu or toéré. In this regard, "Manahuna", which was released in 1990, constitutes a musical turning point, insofar as the orchestrations become more " rock ", with a more prominent use of electric guitar, synthesizer and more powerful percussion. This trend is confirmed in the next two albums. With "Arioi" and the albums that follow, Angelo returns to softer melodies.
