= Riddles in the Sand =

Studio album by Jimmy Buffett
- Released: September 1, 1984
- Recorded: Sound Stage (Nashville, Tennessee)
- Genre: Country; Gulf and Western
- Length: 33:25
- Label: MCA; MCA-5512 (US, 12")
- Producer: Jimmy Bowen

Jimmy Buffett chronology
One Particular Harbour (1983)	Riddles in the Sand (1984)	Last Mango in Paris (1985)

Professional ratings
Review scores
Source	Rating
Allmusic	3/5 stars

Riddles in the Sand is the thirteenth studio album by American popular music singer-songwriter Jimmy Buffett. It was released in September 1984 as MCA 5512 and was produced by noted country music producer Jimmy Bowen and represented a concerted shift toward a more country sound by Buffett. He appeared on the album's cover in typical country singer garb and promoted the album at Fan Fair country music festival in Nashville, Tennessee. The album was originally to have been titled Gulf and Western Music reflecting the fusion of musical styles seen in much of Buffett's music often called Gulf and Western music. In the album's liner notes, Jim Harrison says, "This album has a musical range expanding in an arc from Bob Wills to Bob Marley with the Gulf somehow always there."

== Songs ==
The album is the first of Buffett's not to contain a song written solely by him; he co-wrote all of the songs with Will Jennings and Michael Utley (one also with Josh Leo) except for a song by Mac McAnally and one by Rhonda Coullet. The album's final song, "La Vie Dansante," was later remade by Aaron Neville for his 1991 album Warm Your Heart. That version contained an added background chorus in French. Buffett recorded a new version of "Knees of My Heart" for his 2003 greatest hits collection Meet Me in Margaritaville: The Ultimate Collection.

== Chart performance ==
Riddles in the Sand reached No. 95 on the Billboard 200 album chart and No. 18 on the Billboard Top Country Albums chart. The song "When the Wildlife Betrays Me" hit No. 42 on the Billboard Hot Country Singles chart, "Who's the Blonde Stranger?" hit No. 37 Country, and "Bigger Than the Both of Us" hit No. 58 Country.

Chart (1984)	Peak position
U.S. Billboard Top Country Albums	18
U.S. Billboard 200	95

== Track listing ==
Side 1
No.	Title	Writer(s)	Length
1.	"Who's the Blonde Stranger?"	Jimmy Buffett, Michael Utley, Will Jennings, Josh Leo	3:44
2.	"When the Wildlife Betrays Me"	Jimmy Buffett, Michael Utley, Will Jennings	2:51
3.	"Ragtop Day"	Jimmy Buffett, Michael Utley, Will Jennings	3:03
4.	"She's Going Out of My Mind"	Mac McAnally	3:26
5.	"Bigger than the Both of Us"	Rhonda Coullet	3:57

Side 2
No.	Title	Writer(s)	Length
6.	"Knees of My Heart"	Jimmy Buffett, Michael Utley, Will Jennings	2:41
7.	"Come to the Moon"	Jimmy Buffett, Michael Utley, Will Jennings	3:47
8.	"Love in Decline"	Jimmy Buffett, Michael Utley, Will Jennings	2:42
9.	"Burn that Bridge"	Jimmy Buffett, Michael Utley, Will Jennings	3:12
10.	"La Vie Dansante"	Jimmy Buffett, Michael Utley, Will Jennings	4:02

== Personnel ==
The Coral Reefer Band:

- Jimmy Buffett – guitar, vocals
- Matt Betton – drums, saxophone
- Sam Clayton – percussion
- Emory Gordy Jr. – bass
- Robert Greenidge – steel drums
- Greg "Fingers" Taylor – harmonica
- Mike Utley – keyboards
- Reggie Young – guitar
- John Barlow Jarvis – synthesizer, keyboards
- Billy Joe Walker Jr. – guitar
- Larry Lee, Wendy Waldman, Thomas Flora, Mac McAnally – background vocals

== Singles ==
- "When the Wild Life Betrays Me" b/w "Ragtop Day" (Released on MCA 52438 in August 1984)
- "Bigger Than the Both of Us" b/w "Come to the Moon" (Released on MCA 52499 in November 1984)
- "Who's The Blonde Stranger" b/w "She's Going Out Of My Mind" (Released on MCA 52550 in March 1985)
