= High Cumberland Jubilee =

Studio album by Jimmy Buffett
- Released: 1976
- Recorded: 1971
- Studio: Creative Workshop (Berry Hill, Tennessee)
- Genres: Folk rock; country rock; country folk
- Length: 37:26
- Label: Barnaby
- Producer: Travis Turk

Jimmy Buffett chronology
Down to Earth (1970)	High Cumberland Jubilee (1976)	A White Sport Coat and a Pink Crustacean (1973)

Professional ratings
Review scores
Source	Rating
Allmusic	4/5 stars

High Cumberland Jubilee is the second studio album by American popular-music singer and songwriter Jimmy Buffett. It was produced by Travis Turk, recorded in 1971 for Andy Williams's small Barnaby Records label. This was second album that Buffett recorded, and was his final album with Barnaby, signing next with Dunhill. Following lackluster sales of Buffett's first album, Down to Earth, Barnaby Records would claim that the masters to High Cumberland Jubilee had been lost, hence it has been referred to as Buffett's "lost album." In 1976, after Buffett had left Barnaby and moved to Key West, released numerous additional albums, and become a star, the masters were suddenly found and the album released.

== Alternative versions ==
A rare original variation has "Bend a Little" replacing "England" on side two (a repeat from side one, but with a slightly different mix), and "Ace" replacing "Travelin' Clean". Also, "High Cumberland Jubilee" continues to the end rather than fading out as on the standard version of the album. The longer version of "High Cumberland Jubilee" was used on Before The Beach.

The 1998 re-release of the album contained an additional track, "High Cumberland Dilemma", which was recorded for but not included on the original album.

== Songs ==
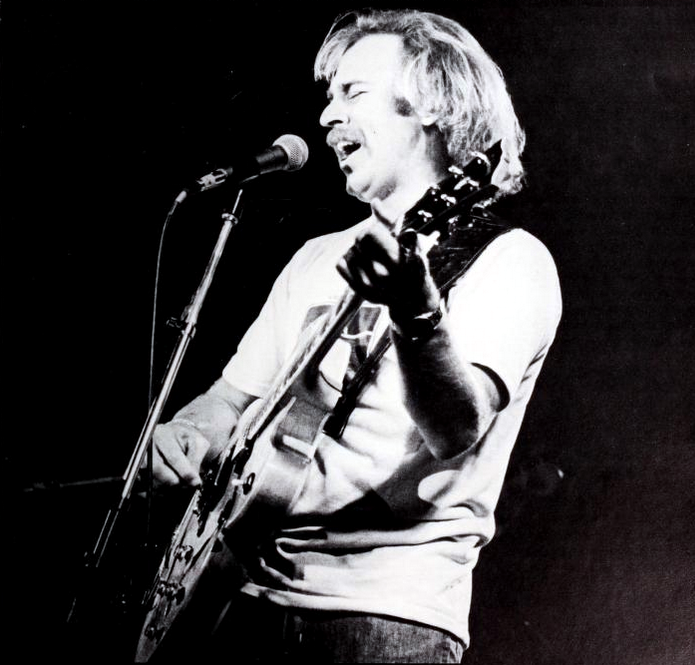
Buffett performing at Clemson University in February 1977

All of the songs on High Cumberland Jubilee were written or co-written by Buffett, many with Buzz Cason. "In the Shelter", which originally appeared on this album, was later re-recorded by Buffett, first for 1977's Changes in Latitudes, Changes in Attitudes when it was released as a single, and in 2002 for the greatest-hits compilation Meet Me in Margaritaville: The Ultimate Collection, making it (with "The Captain and the Kid") one of only two of his songs with three different studio versions. "Livingston's Gone to Texas" was also re-recorded for the 1974 Living and Dying in ¾ Time. The version on High Cumberland Jubilee is played faster without country stylings and contains an extra verse, not in the 1974 version.

The folk-rock style of music and lyrics on Down to Earth and High Cumberland Jubilee differs greatly from Buffett's subsequent output. They have less of the country music feel and little of the Gulf and Western, Key West-influenced sound and themes that have defined his musical career. Allmusic reviewer William Ruhlmann noted, "this is not the freewheeling Jimmy Buffett of 'Margaritaville', but rather a thoughtful folk-rock singer/songwriter of the early '70s, earnestly strumming an acoustic guitar over a rhythm section and singing lyrics of social consciousness with sly references to drugs."

== Track listing ==
=== Original release ===
Side A
No.	Title	Writer(s)	Length
1.	"Ace"	Jimmy Buffett	3:15
2.	"Rockefeller Square"	Jimmy Buffett, Buzz Cason	2:19
3.	"Bend a Little"	Jimmy Buffett, Buzz Cason	2:59
4.	"In the Shelter"	Jimmy Buffett	3:36
5.	"Death Valley Lives"	Jimmy Buffett	3:40
6.	"Livingston's Gone to Texas"	Jimmy Buffett	3:49

Side B
No.	Title	Writer(s)	Length
7.	"England"	Jimmy Buffett, Buzz Cason	2:54
8.	"Travelin' Clean"	Jimmy Buffett, Lanny Fiel	3:07
9.	"The Hangout Gang"	Jimmy Buffett, Buzz Cason	3:40
10.	"God Don't Own a Car"	Jimmy Buffett, Buzz Cason	2:58
11.	"High Cumberland Jubilee/Comin' Down Slow"	Jimmy Buffett, Buzz Cason	5:09

=== 1998 re-release ===
Varese Vintage VSD-5776
No.	Title	Writer(s)	Length
1.	"Ace"	Jimmy Buffett	3:15
2.	"Rockefeller Square"	Jimmy Buffett, Buzz Cason	2:19
3.	"Bend a Little"	Jimmy Buffett, Buzz Cason	2:59
4.	"In the Shelter"	Jimmy Buffett	3:36
5.	"Death Valley Lives"	Jimmy Buffett	3:40
6.	"High Cumberland Dilemma"	Jimmy Buffett, Buzz Cason	3:32
7.	"Livingston's Gone to Texas"	Jimmy Buffett	3:49
8.	"England"	Jimmy Buffett, Buzz Cason	2:54
9.	"Travelin' Clean"	Jimmy Buffett, Lanny Fiel	3:07
10.	"The Hangout Gang"	Jimmy Buffett, Buzz Cason	3:40
11.	"God Don't Own a Car"	Jimmy Buffett, Buzz Cason	2:58
12.	"High Cumberland Jubilee/Comin' Down Slow"	Jimmy Buffett, Buzz Cason	5:09

== Compilations ==
Songs recorded for High Cumberland Jubilee have been released on a number of compilations authorized by Barnaby Records.

- Before the Salt (Barnaby/Janus 1979) — included all of the original release plus Down To Earth on the first disc.
- Before the Beach (MCA 1993) — included all of the original release plus Down To Earth (except "The Christian?" & "Ain't He A Genius") plus "High Cumberland Dilemma" as the last track; was the first CD release of High Cumberland Jubilee material
- American Storyteller (Delta 1999) — only included "Livingston's Gone to Texas", "Travelin' Clean", and "God Don't Own a Car" from the original release
- There's Nothing Soft about Hard Times (Madacy 2000) — only included "Travelin' Clean", "Livingston's Gone to Texas", "God Don't Own a Car", "High Cumberland Jubilee/Comin' Down Slow", and "Rockefeller Square" from the original release
- Best of the Early Years (Delta 2000) — the one-disk version only included "Rockefeller Square", "Bend a Little", "In the Shelter", "Death Valley Lives", and "The Hangout Gang" from the original release plus "High Cumberland Dilemma"
- Now Yer Squawkin' (Recall 2005) — included all of the original release plus "High Cumberland Dilemma"

== Performers ==
=== Band ===
- Jimmy Buffett – vocals, background vocals
- Lanny Fiel – guitar
- Rick Fiel – bass guitar
- Paul Tabet – drums
- Bergen White – trombone
- Bobby Thompson – banjo
- Randy Goodrum – keyboards
- Buzz Cason – keyboards, background vocals
- Don Kloetzke – background vocals on "Death Valley Lives"
