= Don Kloetzke =

American painter

- Born: Donnie Jo Kloetzke; July 29, 1951; Oshkosh, Wisconsin, U.S.
- Died: May 15, 2023 (aged 71)
- Education: Goodrich High School
- Occupation: Painter
- Known for: Wildlife art
- Spouse: Kathleen L. Rentmeister

Don Kloetzke (born July 29, 1951 - May 15, 2023) is an American painter, known for his wildlife art portraits, he has also painted landscapes, still life, World War II aircraft along with emotional Green Bay Packer fan themes.

== Life ==
Don was born in Oshkosh, Wisconsin in 1951. His father was in the military so Don moved with his family as they traveled through Hawaii, Mississippi, California, Germany and other places Kloetzke honed his drawing and painting skills.

Kloetzke's work has been accepted by the Leigh Yawkey Woodson Birds in Art Exhibition, an international invitational show.

== Awards ==
His list of accomplishments, honors and awards include:

- Wisconsin Sportsman Magazine selected Kloetzke as their first “wildlife Artist of the Year”
- Selected as “Sponsor Artist” for the Wisconsin Water fowler's Association.
- “Century Artist of the Year” for PBS Channels 10/36.
- “Sponsor Artist” for Wings over Wisconsin.
- “Midnight at Holy Hill” made the U.S. Art's Best Seller List.
- “Sponsor Artist” for Ducks Unlimited.
- “A New Beginning” made the U.S. Art's Best Seller List.
- Ranked in the top 25 best-selling artists in America by U.S. Art Magazine for three consecutive years, (1993–1995)
- “Best of Show” at:
  - National Art Exhibition of Alaska Wildlife
  - St. Paul Winter and Wildlife Art Exhibit
  - National Wildlife & Western Art Exhibition (Milwaukee)
  - National Wildlife & Western Art Exhibition (Minneapolis)
