= Bobby Holcomb =

American artist and musician

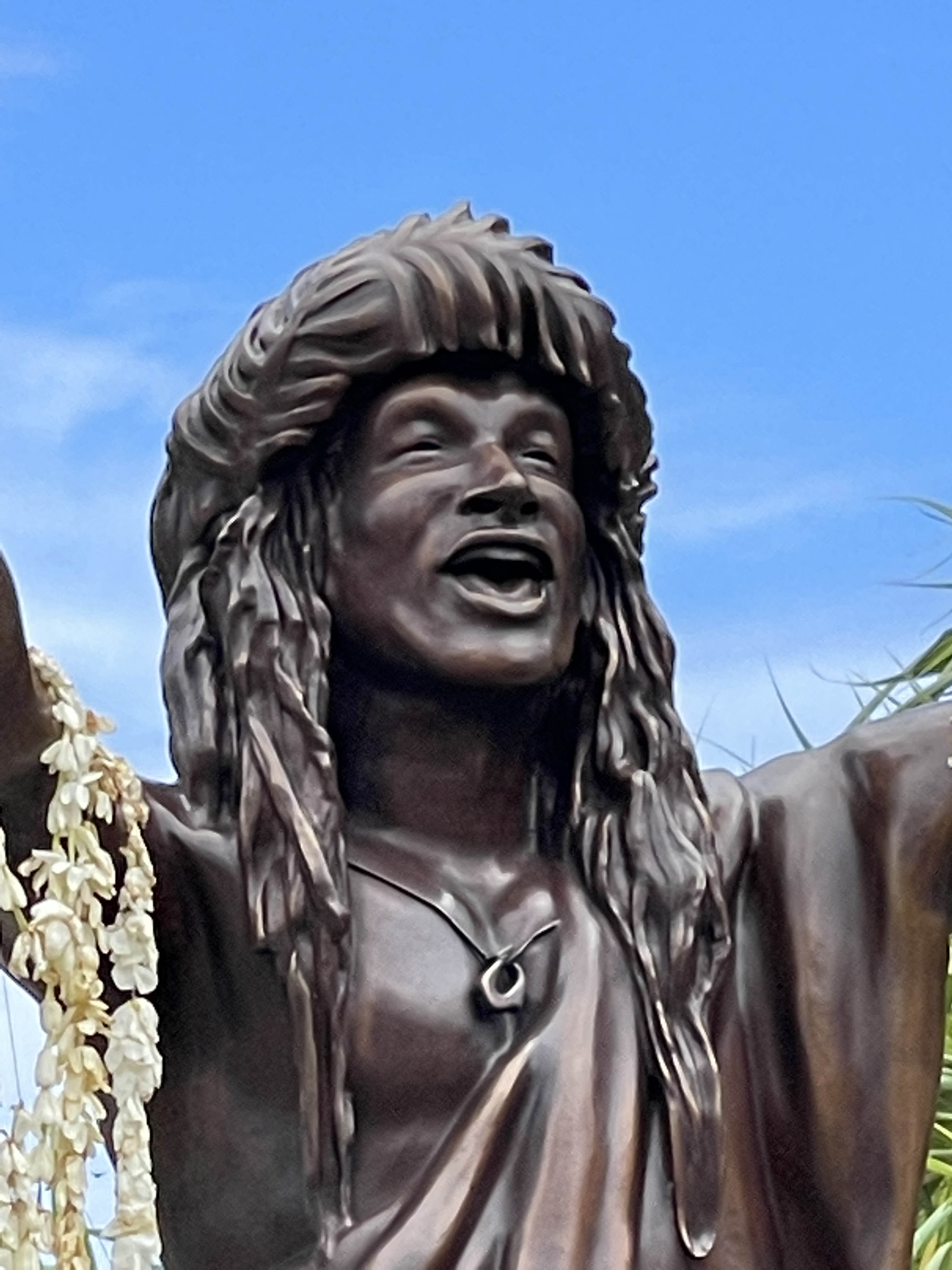
Statue of Bobby Holcomb by sculptor Evrard Chaussoy

Bobby Holcomb (1947–1991) was an artist and musician who wrote popular Polynesian tunes.

== Biography ==
Bobby Holcomb was born in 1947 in Honolulu, Hawaii, the son of an African-American father from Georgia, and a Hawaiian-Portuguese mother.

In the early 1970s, he travelled extensively through Asia, Europe and the Americas. In France, he performed with French pop groups such as Zig Zag Community and Johane of Arch, and he collaborated with French artists Sylvain Duplant, Jean-Pierre Auffredo and Éric Estève. He moved to Tahiti in 1976, and settled on the island of Huahine and learned the Tahitian language. He began composing songs in the Polynesian language, and combined traditional Polynesian melodies with reggae and popular rhythms. He became known to audiences simply as "Bobby". Most of his songs were written in Polynesian, but he also used French and English for some lyrics. His most popular song in Tahiti was "Orio", produced 1985.

In addition to music, he was also a painter and painted many murals and paintings. He used his art to promote Tahitian culture, and protested against French colonialism and nuclear testing on the islands. For his educational and cultural efforts, he was named French Polynesia's Personality of the Year in 1988.

He died from cancer on February 15, 1991. Local Tahitian television stations treated his death as a matter of great national importance.

== Collaboration with Jimmy Buffett and Pascal Nabet Meyer ==
One of Holcomb's most famous tunes in the United States is "One Particular Harbour", which he co-wrote with American singer-songwriter Jimmy Buffett in 1983. The song appears on Buffett's album of the same title and is performed live at nearly all of his concerts. In 1982 Holcomb met Pascal Nabet Meyer (Walter Becker, Rickie Lee Jones, Steely Dan, Daniel Lanois, David Lynch), who had moved to Tahiti, and the two collaborated in writing songs. Nabet Meyer produced and recorded his first number-one Billboard's album, entitled Rapa Iti, with The Tahitian Choir, bringing traditional Polynesian music to a world audience.

== Paintings ==
The book Varua Tupu (2006) contains several of Holcomb's paintings.

One of Holcomb's most popular paintings is "The Kites of Mata'Irea" depicting native Polynesians flying kites.

== Discography ==
Holcomb never signed with a major label, and his early music was mostly produced on cassettes. The albums that did make their way to compact disc are out of print, and used copies are very rare. Tahitian television made some videos of Holcomb performing his tunes in the 1980s, and some of those videos can be found on the internet, on sites such as YouTube.

== Legacy ==
In 2021, the Polynesian artist Évrard Chaussoy with the support of his friend Heiarii Girard, created a three meter fifty high bronze statue of Bobby.
