= Dagobert Neuffer =

German actor and theatre director

Dagobert Neuffer (originally Neumann; 17 May 1851 – 12 November 1939) was a German stage actor and theatre director of Hungarian origin. He held the title of "Grand Ducal Court Actor".

== Life ==
Neuffer was born in Púchov, a village near Großbetschkerek in the Banat as the eldest son of the Jewish Hazzan and teacher Armin Neumann and his wife Rosalie, née Mittler. At the age of 17, he left his parents' house for Vienna. He attended the Kirschner's Theatre Academy there and was trained by Alexander Strakosch. In 1871, he made his debut in Regensburg, Bavaria. Further stations led him via Bratislava and Graz to the Thalia Theatre in Hamburg and the Schauspielhaus Berlin as well as to Stuttgart. At the Cuvilliés Theatre in Munich, he once had a performance before Ludwig II., King of Bavaria. In 1882, he came to Bohemian Prague, where he shone in the leading role of "Schiller" in the Karlsschüler by Heinrich Laube. But a little later, he had a row with the artistic director and was dismissed. Although he successfully led a lawsuit for breach of contract, he did not continue his activities in Prague.

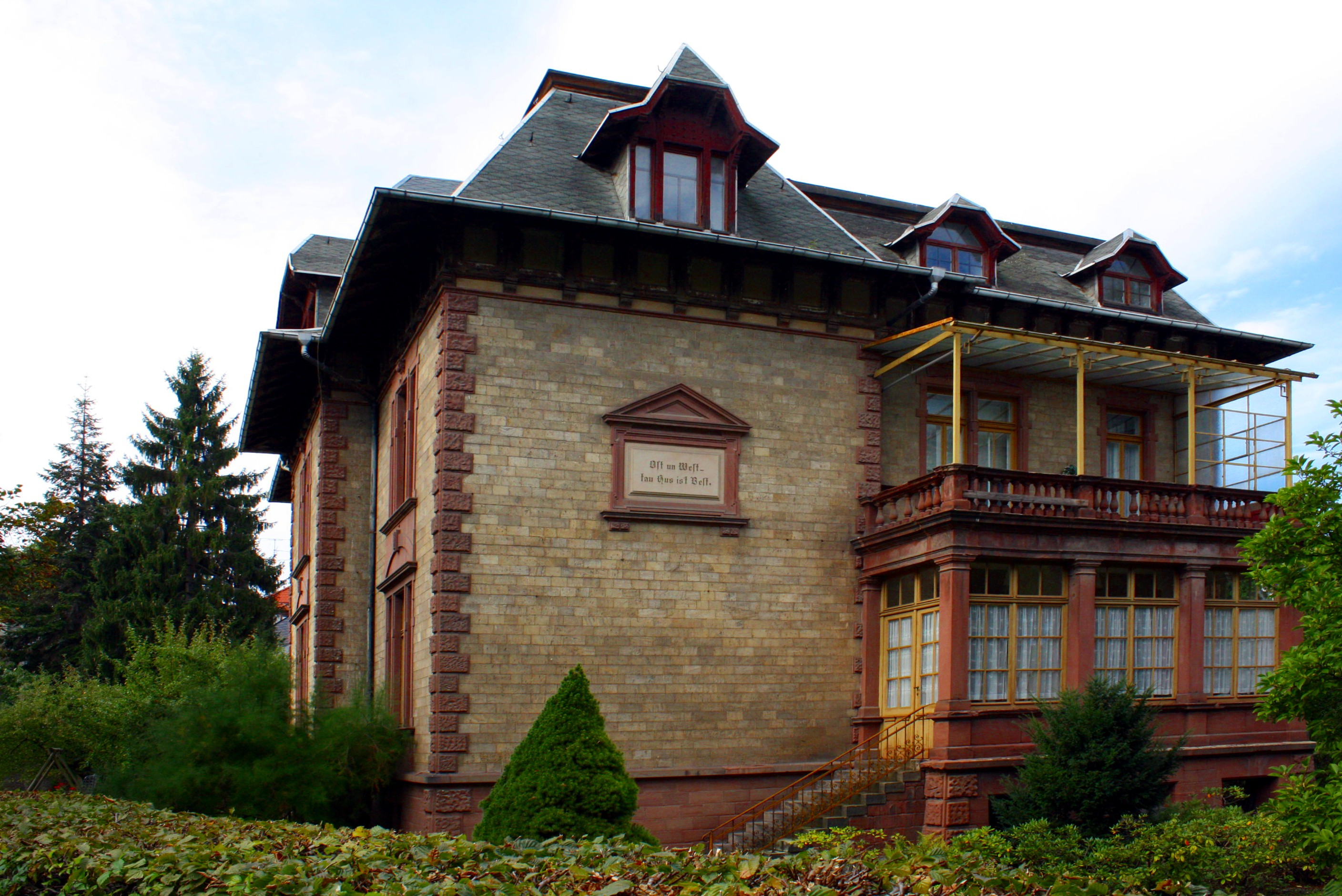
Former villa of the families Neuffer-Stavenhagen in Weimar (2014)

In 1884, Neuffer was engaged for three years at the Großherzogliches Hoftheater Weimar. His first role was Torquato Tasso in the eponymous play by Goethe. He gained renown as a hero and young lover, such as Romeo in Shakespeare's Romeo and Juliet and Don Carlos in Schiller's Don Carlos. In 1888, he played the "Marquis de Villemer" in the comedy of the same name by George Sand. In 1890, he took over the role of Hamlet (Shakespeare) and one year later that of "Christoph Marlow" (Ernst von Wildenbruch) in the respective tragedies of the same name. In 1891, he was finally allowed to fill out the leading role in Shakespeare's Othello. His leading roles also included "Posa", "Ferdinand", "Mortimer", "Sansnom", "Sittig", "Melchthal", "Templar", "Richard II", "Clavigo", "Carl IX", "Gringoire", "Lothar" and "Menonit". During the directorship of August von Loën, he applied for a lifelong engagement. However, his successor Hans Bronsart von Schellendorf only accepted multi-year contracts. There were also rivalries with the head director Paul Brock.

In 1895, Neuffer took over the management of the city and summer theatre of Metz in Reichsland Elsaß-Lothringen and the Saarländisches Staatstheater. He also worked as a senior director. In spite of his leading positions, he did not miss the opportunity to continue his acting career ("Marquis Posa", "Marc Anton", "Hamlet" and "Don Carlos"). In 1907, he left the house and moved back to Weimar. While he was an active actor, he lived at Villa Stavenhagen (Kurthstraße 18) with his parents-in-law. The Neufferts were the sole owners of the property from 1906.

From 1891, Neuffer was married to the writer Hildegard Neuffer-Stavenhagen (1866–1939) and father of four children. Thus, he was a brother-in-law of Agnes Stavenhagen, soprano and Kammersängerin. His daughter Hilde (later Rawson) married the violin virtuoso Max Strub in her first marriage. Neuffer was among the artist friends of Rudolf Steiner, his wife and he were interested in anthroposophy. Steiner was godfather to his son Harald. His sons died in the First World War, Hans-Armin († 1915) at the First Battle of Champagne and Harald († 1917) at the Eastern Front.

Neuffer died in Weimar at the age of 88.

== Awards ==
- Order of the Crown, Knight IV Class (Prussia)
- Order of the Zähringer Lion, Knight II classe (Baden)
- Order of the White Falcon, Knight (Sachsen-Weimar-Eisenach)
- Goldene Ehejubiläums-Medaille (Sachsen-Weimar-Eisenach)
