= Hildegard Neuffer-Stavenhagen =

German woman writer

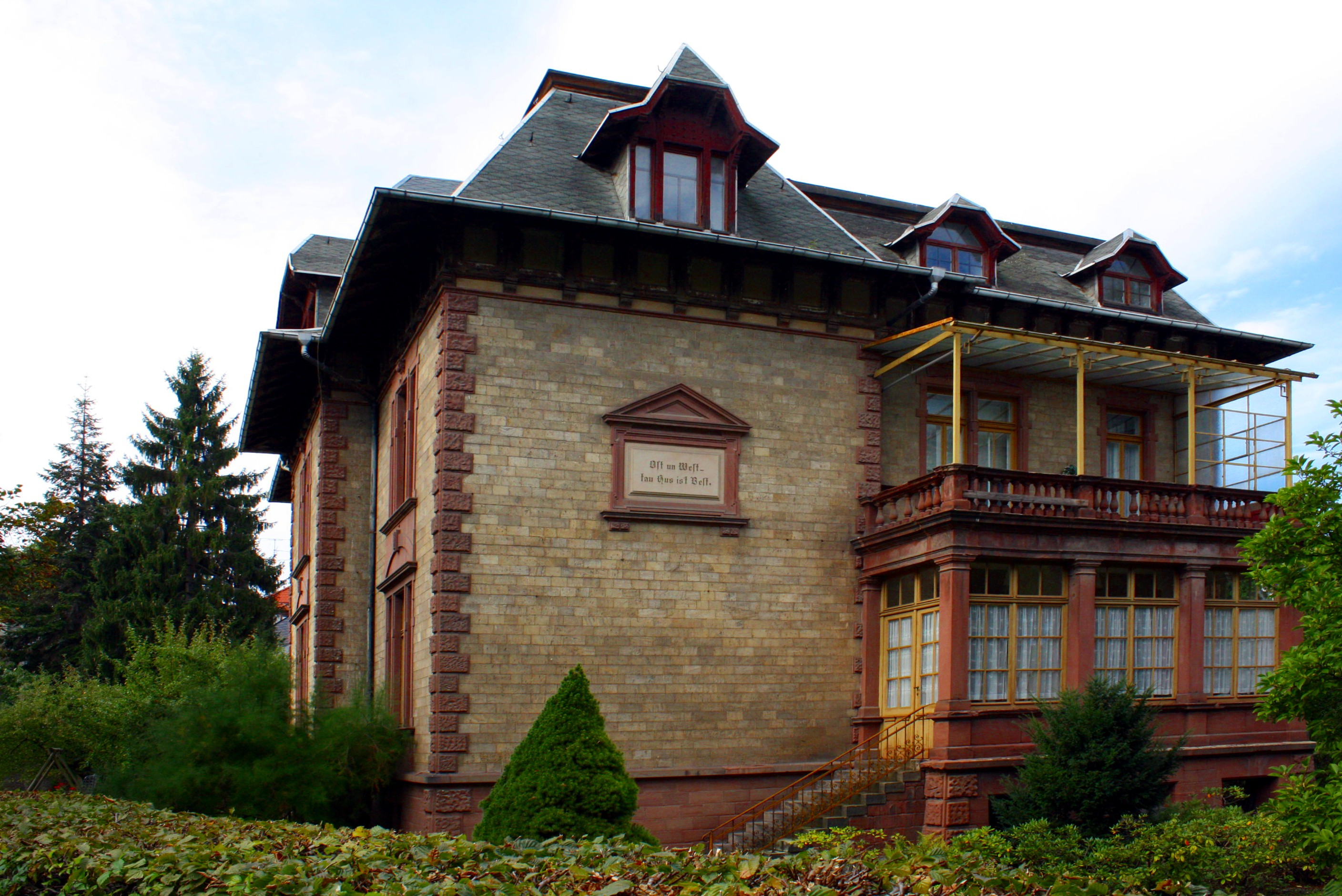
House in Weimar (2014)

Hildegard Neuffer-Stavenhagen (née Stavenagen 3 July 1866 in Greiz – 17 October 1939 in Weimar aged 73) was a German writer with a focus on children's literature and education.

Stavenhagen was born as the daughter of a merchant. She received piano lessons early on, her brother was the composer and pianist Bernhard Stavenhagen (1862–1914). Hildegard Neuffer-Stavenhagen was married with the Hungarian-born actor and theatre director Dagobert Neuffer (1851-1939) and mother of four children. Her son-in-law was the violinist Max Strub.

== Work ==
- Märchenfäden. With illustrations by Oskar Herrfurth. 5th mixed edition, M. R. Hoffmann, Berlin 1919 (6th edition 1921).
- Kinderseelen. Aus dem Tagebuche einer Mutter. M. R. Hoffmann, Berlin 1919.
- Schneewittchen und die sieben Zwerge. Märchenspiel in 10 Bildern. Music by Helmut Fellmer, Waisenhaus-Buchdruck, Braunschweig 1920.
- "Neuffers Tierleben". Wie meine Kinder mit Tieren Freundschaft hielten. With book decoration by Adalbert Stieren and 8 switched on reality pictures, Max R. Hoffmann, Berlin 1921.
- Durchsonnte Pflichten, eine Überwindung des Alltags. M. R. Hoffmann, Berlin 1925.
- Krippenspiel in drei Bildern. Textb. Vieweg, Berlin 1932.
- Die Mutterschaft, unsere Unsterblichkeit. Böhlau, Weimar 1935.

== Literature ==
- Elisabeth Friedrichs: Die deutschsprachigen Schriftstellerinnen des 18 und 19 Jahrhunderts. Ein Lexikon (Repertorien zur deutschen Literaturgeschichte. Vol. 9). Metzler, Stuttgart 1981, ISBN 3-476-00456-2, p. 218.
- Elgin Strub: Meine Großeltern, Hildegard Neuffer-Stavenhagen, Schriftstellerin und Dagobert Neuffer, großherzoglicher Schauspieler in Weimar. In Skizzen einer Künstlerfamilie in Weimar. J. E. Ronayne, London 1999, ISBN 0-9536096-0-X, pp. 29–54.
- Fritz Karl Voß: Weimarer Schattengeister. Scherenschnitte und Originalhandschriften aus dem literarischen Weimar von heute. A. Duncker, Weimar 1922.
