= Somewhere over China =

Studio album by Jimmy Buffett
- Released: January 1982
- Recorded: September–October 1981
- Studio: Bennett House, (Franklin, Tennessee)
- Genre: Country rock; Gulf and Western
- Length: 35:18
- Label: MCA; MCA-5285 (US, 12")
- Producer: Norbert Putnam

Jimmy Buffett chronology
Coconut Telegraph (1981)	Somewhere over China (1982)	One Particular Harbour (1983)

Professional ratings
Review scores
Source	Rating
Allmusic	3/5 stars

Somewhere over China (Chinese: 在中國的某一地方; pinyin: Zài Zhōngguó de Mǒu yí Dìfāng) is the eleventh studio album by American singer-songwriter Jimmy Buffett. It was released in January 1982 as MCA 5285 and is the last Buffett album produced by Norbert Putnam.

== Songs ==
In addition to songs written or co-written by Buffett (two with Steve Goodman and two with Michael Utley), the album includes the John Scott Sherrill-penned "Steamer" and Frank Loesser's 1940s standard "On a Slow Boat to China." Recorded for the album but not included was "Elvis Imitators", also written by Goodman, with Buffett singing an Elvis Presley imitation with the Jordanaires on background vocals. The song was to be credited to "Freddie and the Fishsticks" and it was later released on Buffett's box set, Boats, Beaches, Bars & Ballads. "I Heard I Was in Town" was also included on the box set in the Ballads section, but in a slightly different mix than what appears on Somewhere over China; it also makes its only official live recording on Buffett's 2009 live EP Live from Key West.

Record World called the single "It's Midnight and I'm Not Famous Yet" a "sharp rocker."

== Chart performance ==
Somewhere over China reached No. 31 on the Billboard 200 album chart. The song "It's Midnight and I'm Not Famous Yet" hit No. 32 on the (then new) Billboard Rock Tracks chart.

== Track listing ==
Side 1
No.	Title	Writer(s)	Length
1.	"Where's the Party"	Jimmy Buffett, Steve Goodman, Bill LaBounty	3:37
2.	"It's Midnight and I'm Not Famous Yet"	Jimmy Buffett, Steve Goodman	3:49
3.	"I Heard I Was in Town"	Jimmy Buffett, Michael Utley	3:36
4.	"Somewhere over China"	Jimmy Buffett	5:20

Side 2
No.	Title	Writer(s)	Length
5.	"When Salome Plays the Drum"	Jimmy Buffett	3:25
6.	"Lip Service"	Jimmy Buffett, Michael Utley	3:57
7.	"If I Could Just Get It on Paper"	Jimmy Buffett	3:32
8.	"Steamer"	John Scott Sherrill	4:06
9.	"On a Slow Boat to China"	Frank Loesser	3:56

== Personnel ==
The Coral Reefer Band:

- Jimmy Buffett – vocals, rhythm guitar
- Josh Leo – electric and acoustic guitars
- Barry Chance – electric and acoustic guitars
- Michael Utley – piano, organ, synthesizer
- Greg "Fingers" Taylor – harmonica
- Harry Dailey – bass
- Matt "Matty Dread" Betton – drums, timbales
- M. L. Benoit – congas

Additional Reefers:

- Farrell Morris – vibes and percussion
- Norbert Putnam – upright bass and Casio
- Doyle Grisham – pedal steel guitar
- Hank DeVito – pedal steel guitar on "If I could Just Get it on Paper"
- Deborah McColl – reeferette
- Florence "Bambi" Warner – reeferette
- Christian Bachellier – reeferette
- David Loggins – reeferette
- Freddy Fishstick – reeferette

== Singles ==
- "It's Midnight And I'm Not Famous Yet" b/w "When Salome Plays The Drum" (Released on MCA 52013 in February 1982)
- "Where's The Party" b/w "If I Could Just Get It On Paper" (Released on MCA 52050 in April 1982)
