= Last Mango in Paris =

Studio album by Jimmy Buffett
- Released: July 1985
- Studio: Sound Stage (Nashville, Tennessee)
- Genre: Country; Gulf and Western
- Length: 36:24
- Label: MCA; MCA-5600 (US, 12")
- Producer: Jimmy Buffett; Tony Brown

Jimmy Buffett chronology
Riddles in the Sand (1984)	Last Mango in Paris (1985)	Songs You Know by Heart (1985)

Last Mango in Paris is the fourteenth studio album by American popular music singer-songwriter Jimmy Buffett. It was released in July 1985 as MCA 5600 and was produced by Buffett and noted country music producer Tony Brown. The album represented continuation of Buffett's shift toward a more country sound begun with 1984's Riddles in the Sand. The title of the album is a play on the title of the 1972 movie Last Tango in Paris.

== Songs ==
The album contains no song written solely by Buffett; he co-wrote most of the songs with Will Jennings, Marshall Chapman, and/or Michael Utley. He recorded one song, "Frank and Lola," which he had written with Steve Goodman who died in 1984. Buffett dedicated the album to Goodman and this would be the last Goodman song Buffett would record as of 2007. "Desperation Samba (Halloween in Tijuana)" features the sound of a whip cracking performed by actor Harrison Ford, a reminder of Ford's use of the whip in the Indiana Jones movies. Buffett recorded a live version the song for his 2003 greatest hits collection Meet Me in Margaritaville: The Ultimate Collection, along with the title song and concert staple "Jolly Mon Sing". The song "Last Mango in Paris" was written about Captain Tony Tarracino, a well-known Key West, Florida saloon keeper, and live versions of the song appear on Live by the Bay and Feeding Frenzy. The song also features a coda that is a callback to "La Vie Dansante" from Buffett's previous album, Riddles in the Sand. Singer Glenn Frey makes a vocal cameo at the end of the song he co-wrote with Buffett, "Gypsies in the Palace". This song also appears on the album "Live at Fenway Park".

== Chart performance ==
Last Mango in Paris reached No. 53 on the Billboard 200 album chart and No. 7 on the Billboard Top Country Albums chart. The song "If the Phone Doesn't Ring, It's Me" hit No. 16 on the Billboard Hot Country Singles chart and No. 37 Adult Contemporary and "Please Bypass this Heart" hit No. 50 Country.

Chart (1985)	Peak position
U.S. Billboard Top Country Albums	7
U.S. Billboard 200	53

== Critical reception ==
Professional ratings
Review scores
Source	Rating
Allmusic	3/5 stars

Reviewer Johnny Loftus of Allmusic argues that, "Last Mango in Paris' host of high points make it essential for anyone enamored of Buffett's live shows, or even the casual fan looking to expand beyond Songs You Know by Heart." Although none of the album's songs are part of "The Big 8" that Buffett has played at almost all of his concerts, "Last Mango in Paris," "Gypsies in the Palace," "Desperation Samba" and "Jolly Mon Sing" were played at many concerts in the 1980s and 1990s and most are featured on the Live by the Bay concert video and the Feeding Frenzy live album. A live version of "Desperation Samba" appears on the 2003 compilation Meet Me in Margaritaville: The Ultimate Collection, along with the studio versions of "Jolly Mon Sing" and the title track.

== Track listing ==
Side 1
No.	Title	Writer(s)	Length
1.	"Everybody's on the Run"	Jimmy Buffett, Marshall Chapman, Will Jennings, Michael Utley	3:26
2.	"Frank and Lola"	Jimmy Buffett, Steve Goodman	3:16
3.	"The Perfect Partner"	Marshall Chapman	3:05
4.	"Please Bypass This Heart"	Jimmy Buffett, Will Jennings, Michael Utley	3:18
5.	"Gypsies in the Palace"	Jimmy Buffett, Glenn Frey, Will Jennings	5:07

Side 2
No.	Title	Writer(s)	Length
6.	"Desperation Samba (Halloween in Tijuana)"	Jimmy Buffett, Will Jennings, Timothy B. Schmit	3:31
7.	"If the Phone Doesn't Ring, It's Me"	Jimmy Buffett, Will Jennings, Michael Utley	3:25
8.	"Last Mango in Paris"	Jimmy Buffett, Marshall Chapman, Will Jennings, Michael Utley	3:14
9.	"Jolly Mon Sing"	Jimmy Buffett, Will Jennings, Michael Utley	3:15
10.	"Beyond the End"	Jimmy Buffett, Marshall Chapman, Will Jennings	4:47

== Personnel ==
The Coral Reefer Band:

- Jimmy Buffett – vocals, guitar
- Matt Betton – drums
- Josh Leo – guitar
- Robert Greenidge – steel drums, percussion
- Vince Melamed – keyboards
- Greg "Fingers" Taylor – harmonica
- Mike Utley – keyboards
- Sam Clayton – congas, percussion, background vocals
- Larry Byrom – electric guitar
- Glenn Frey – guitar, background vocals
- Emory Gordy Jr. – bass, electric bass
- John Barlow Jarvis – keyboards
- Mark O'Connor – violin
- Reggie Young – electric guitar
- Roy Orbison – background vocals on "Beyond The End"
- Marshall Chapman, Larry Lee, Wendy Waldman, John Edwards, Timothy B. Schmit, Pam Tillis, Frank "Birdie" Saulino, Jim "Val" Valentini, Harry Stinson – background vocals
- Harrison Ford – bullwhip on "Desperation Samba"

== Singles ==
- "Gypsies In The Palace" b/w "Jolly Mon Sing" (Released on MCA 52607 in June 1985)
- "If The Phone Doesn't Ring, It's Me" b/w "Frank And Lola" (Released on MCA 52664 in August 1985)
- "Please Bypass This Heart" b/w "Beyond The End" (Released on MCA 52752 in January 1986)

== Charts ==
=== Weekly charts ===
Chart (1985)	Peak position
US Billboard 200	53
US Top Country Albums (Billboard)	7

=== Year-end charts ===
Chart (1985)	Position
US Top Country Albums (Billboard)	48
