= Robert Greenidge =

Trinidadian steelpan player (1950–2026)

Background information
- Born: 28 April 1950; Success Laventille, Laventille, Trinidad and Tobago
- Died: 8 June 2026 (aged 76)
- Occupation: Musician
- Instruments: Steelpan; drums
- Years active: 1975–2026
- Formerly of: Coral Reefer Band

Robert Greenidge (April 28, 1950 – June 8, 2026) was a Trinidadian steelpan player. He was a member of popular music singer Jimmy Buffett's Coral Reefer Band and the instrumental group Club Trini. Greenidge also collaborated with artists such as Robert Palmer, John Lennon, Kenny Chesney, Taj Mahal, Ringo Starr, Earth, Wind & Fire, and Carly Simon.

== Career ==
Greenidge began performing as a pannist at age eight and performed internationally beginning in his teens. During 1970 he represented Trinidad and Tobago as a soloist and as a member of Trinidad and Tobago National Steel Orchestra. Within the next year he migrated to the United States where he studied and played music.

Robert Greenidge holds a significant place in the history of the legendary Desperadoes Steel Orchestra. Early Beginnings with Desperadoes. Raised in Success Village, Laventille, Trinidad, Greenidge joined Desperadoes in 1965 as a teenager. Under the guidance of band leader Rudolph Charles and seasoned musical figures like Emmanuel "Corbeau Jack" Riley, Greenidge honed his skills as a performer and learned the foundations of arrangement alongside icon arrangers Clive Bradley and Beverly Griffith.

Musical Role & Arranging Career Greenidge grew into one of the main arrangers and musical leaders for Desperadoes:

Arranging Style & Technique: Known for his sophisticated voicing, intricate chromatic phrasing, and understanding of harmonic ranges across different pan instruments, Greenidge balanced traditional Trinidadian steelband sonorities with jazz and pop influences.

National Panorama Victories:

Greenidge led Desperadoes to major victories as an arranger at the prestigious Trinidad & Tobago National Panorama competition:

1985: Co-arranged Pan Night and Day alongside Beverly Griffith to secure a joint 1st place.

1991: Arranged and composed Musical Volcano, taking 1st place with a performance incorporating specialized percussion dynamics (such as timpani and gongs).

1994: Won 1st place with his arrangement of his own composition, Fire Coming Down.

Steelband Music Festival Success: Outside of Panorama, Greenidge arranged non-calypso classical pieces for Desperadoes at the Steelband Music Festival, leading the orchestra to victory in 1991 with his arrangement of the opera excerpt Bartered Bride.

He went on to play on Carly Simon's album Another Passenger, Ringo Starr's record Ringo's Rotogravure, and Robert Palmer's LP Some People Can Do What They Like all in 1976. He also appeared on the latter's 1978 album Double Fun. He then performed on Grover Washington Jr.'s 1980 album Winelight and John Lennon and Yoko Ono's 1980 LP Double Fantasy. He also featured on JJ Cale's 1982 album Grasshopper, Earth Wind and Fire's 1983 album Powerlight, and Jimmy Buffett's 1983 LP One Particular Harbour. Greenidge later played on Buffett's 1984 album Riddles in the Sand and Steve Perry's 1984 LP Street Talk. Greenidge's talents were also utilized extensively on Harry Nilsson's Duit on Mon Dei, Sandman, and ...That's the Way It Is.

Greenidge went on to perform on Buffet's 1985 album Last Mango in Paris, his 1986 release Floridays, Robert Palmer's 1989 album Addictions: Volume 1, and Buffett's 1994 album Fruitcakes.

From 1978 to 1983, he played and toured with blues singer Taj Mahal. During 1986, Greenidge released his own album, Mad Music, with fellow Coral Reefer Michael Utley. He continued to record with Utley as Club Trini. He continued to work in his native country and played the Trinidad and Tobago Carnival every year since 1979. He won the national steelband competition Panorama twice with the Desperadoes Steel Orchestra in 1991 and 1994, both times with his own compositions.

== Death ==
Robert Greenidge died on June 8, 2026, at the age of 76, after suffering a stroke.

== Discography ==
- Mad Music — Robert Greenidge and Michael Utley (1986; MCA)
- Jubilee — Robert Greenidge and Michael Utley (1987; MCA 42045)
- Heat — Robert Greenidge and Michael Utley (1988; MCA)
- Margaritaville Cafe: Late Night Menu — Various Performers (1993; Margaritaville)
- Caribbean Paradise — Dennis Desouza (1994; Wirl)
- It's Christmas Mon! Steel Pan Music Christmas — Robert Greenidge (1995; Intersound 3529)
- Club Trini — Greenidge/Utley - Club Trini (1996; Margaritaville 531041)
- Back in Town — Greenidge/Utley - Club Trini (1999; Club Trini Records)
- Margaritaville Cafe: Late Night Live - Greenidge/Utley — Club Trini (2000; Mailboat Records)
- From the Heart — Robert Greenidge (2003; Antisia)
- Steel Pans on Speak Easy - Don't Tread on Me — 311 (2005)
- Don't Tread on Me
- A Coral Reefer Christmas – Robert Greenidge (2010; Mailboat Records)
- A Lovely Cruise - Robert Greenidge (2013; Mailboat Records)

== See also ==
- Coral Reefer Band
