= Coconut Telegraph =

Studio album by Jimmy Buffett
- Released: February 1981
- Recorded: September 1980
- Studio: Muscle Shoals (Sheffield); Quadrafonic Sound (Nashville); Bennett House, (Franklin, Tennessee); A&R (New York City)
- Genre: Country rock; Gulf and Western
- Length: 32:46
- Label: MCA; MCA-5169 (US, 12")
- Producer: Norbert Putnam

Jimmy Buffett chronology
Volcano (1979)	Coconut Telegraph (1981)	Somewhere over China (1982)

Professional ratings
Review scores
Source	Rating
Allmusic	3/5 stars

Coconut Telegraph is the tenth studio album by American popular music singer-songwriter Jimmy Buffett. It was released in February 1981 as MCA 5169 and was produced by Norbert Putnam.

== Songs ==
In addition to songs written or co-written by Buffett (including one with JD Souther), the album includes the 1934 jazz standard "Stars Fell on Alabama" penned by Mitchell Parish and Frank Perkins and "It's My Job" written by Mac McAnally, the beginning of a long-term collaboration that would lead to McAnally becoming a member of Buffett's Coral Reefer Band.

== Chart performance ==
Coconut Telegraph reached No. 30 on the Billboard 200 album chart. The song "It's My Job" hit No. 57 on the Billboard Hot 100 singles and would be Buffett's last appearance on that chart for over 20 years until his 2003 duet with Alan Jackson, "It's Five O'Clock Somewhere."

== Track listing ==
Side 1
No.	Title	Writer(s)	Length
1.	"Coconut Telegraph"	Jimmy Buffett	2:57
2.	"Incommunicado"	Jimmy Buffett, Deborah McColl, M. L. Benoit	3:39
3.	"It's My Job"	Mac McAnally	3:10
4.	"Growing Older But Not Up"	Jimmy Buffett	3:23
5.	"The Good Fight" (with JD Souther)	Jimmy Buffett, JD Souther	3:25

Side 2
No.	Title	Writer(s)	Length
6.	"The Weather is Here, Wish You Were Beautiful"	Jimmy Buffett	4:06
7.	"Stars Fell on Alabama"	Mitchell Parish, Frank Perkins	4:12
8.	"Island"	Jimmy Buffett, David Loggins	3:54
9.	"Little Miss Magic"	Jimmy Buffett	4:00

== Personnel ==
The Coral Reefer Band:

- Jimmy Buffett – vocals, acoustic guitar
- Barry Chance – electric guitar
- Josh Leo – electric guitar
- Andy McMahon – organ, Fender Rhodes
- Harry Dailey – bass, background vocals
- Matt Betton – drums
- M. L. Benoit – congas and percussion, background vocals
- Greg "Fingers" Taylor – harmonica
- Michael Utley – organ
- David Briggs – piano
- Mac McAnally – background vocals on "It's My Job"
- JD Souther – co-lead vocals on "The Good Fight", background vocals on "It's My Job"
- Dr. Kino Bachellier – Shakers and French
- Freddie Buffett – background vocals
- Norbert Putnam – upright bass
- Dominic Cortese – accordion
- Deborah McColl – background vocals

== Singles ==
- "It's My Job" b/w "Little Miss Magic" (Released on MCA 51061 in January 1981; his only Hot 100 single of the 80s, peaking at #57)
- "Stars Fell on Alabama" b/w "Growing Older But Not Up" (Released on MCA 51105 in April 1981)
