= Down to Earth and High Cumberland Jubilee compilations =

American singer-songwriter Jimmy Buffett's first two albums, Down to Earth and High Cumberland Jubilee, have been re-released numerous times in their entirety and in part in compilations. These two albums were initially released on the now defunct Barnaby Records label which Buffett left prior to signing with Dunhill, a major label, and attaining mass popularity. Due to their limited initial appeal, long periods out of general release, and stylistic differences with the rest of Buffett's work, these albums were often not considered part of the chronology of Buffett albums by fans or even Buffett himself. However, especially from the late 1990s, they have been licensed to a number of minor record companies for re-release and there has been a proliferation of compilations including some or all of the songs from the albums. The compilations and re-releases of the albums are presented chronologically by date of release below.

== Before the Salt ==
The first compilation of Down to Earth and High Cumberland Jubilee was Before the Salt in 1979. It is a two-LP collection with the entire original releases the albums with the addition of "Richard Frost" to Down to Earth. The album has never been issued on compact disc.

== Jimmy Buffett (1981) ==
The 1981 album Jimmy Buffett is a reissue of Down to Earth on Barnaby with different artwork but the same track order including "Richard Frost." The album has never been issued on compact disc.

Track listing
No.	Title	Length
1.	"The Christian?"
2.	"Ellis Dee (He Ain't Free)"
3.	"Richard Frost"
4.	"The Missionary"
5.	"A Mile High in Denver"
6.	"The Captain and the Kid"
7.	"Captain America"
8.	"Ain't He a Genius"
9.	"Turnabout"
10.	"There's Nothin Soft about Hard Times"
11.	"I Can't Be Your Hero Today"
12.	"Truckstop Salvation"

== Before the Beach ==
Before the Beach (1993) is the first compact disc of material from Down to Earth and High Cumberland Jubilee. It was released by Margaritaville/MCA Records and included all of the original release of Down to Earth and High Cumberland Jubilee except "The Christian?" but with the addition of "High Cumberland Dilemma." Before the Beach is the only collection of Down to Earth and High Cumberland Jubilee material to appear on the music charts, reaching No. 169 on the Billboard 200 in 1993.

== American Storyteller ==
American Storyteller is a one-CD compilation including selections from Down to Earth and High Cumberland Jubilee released on Delta Records imprint LaserLight 21240 in February 1999. This album leaves off the question mark in the title of "The Christian?," a song attacking religious hypocrisy.

Track listing
No.	Title	Length
1.	"The Christian"
2.	"Ellis Dee"
3.	"Richard Frost"
4.	"A Mile High in Denver"
5.	"The Captain and the Kid"
6.	"Captain America"
7.	"Ain't He a Genius"
8.	"Turnabout"
9.	"I Can't Be Your Hero Today"
10.	"Livingston's Gone to Texas"
11.	"Traveling Clean"
12.	"God Don't Own a Car"

=== Reviews ===
- Allmusic review

== There's Nothing Soft about Hard Times ==
There's Nothing Soft about Hard Times is a one-CD compilation including selections from Down to Earth and High Cumberland Jubilee released on Madacy 3456 in February 2000. A two-CD Collector's Edition: There's Nothing Soft About Hard Times was also released on Madacy 3470 and has the same tracks and track order as the 2006 album Jimmy Buffett.

Track listing
No.	Title	Length
1.	"There's Nothing Soft about Hard Times"
2.	"Traveling Clean"
3.	"Livingston's Gone To Texas"
4.	"I Can't be Your Hero Today"
5.	"God Don't Own a Car"
6.	"The Captain and the Kid"
7.	"Mile High in Denver"
8.	"Ain't He a Genius"
9.	"Captain America"
10.	"High Cumberland Jubilee/Comin' Down Slow"
11.	"Rockefeller Square"
12.	"Truckstop Salvation"

=== Collector's Edition track listing ===
Disc 1
No.	Title	Length
1.	"There's Nothing Soft about Hard Times"
2.	"Traveling Clean"
3.	"Livingston's Gone to Texas"
4.	"I Can't Be Your Hero Today"
5.	"God Don't Own a Car"
6.	"The Captain and the Kid"
7.	"A Mile High in Denver"
8.	"Ain't He a Genius"
9.	"Captain America"
10.	"High Cumberland Jubilee/Coming Down Slow"
11.	"Rockefeller Square"
12.	"Truckstop Salvation"

Disc 2
No.	Title	Length
1.	"Ace"
2.	"Bend a Little"
3.	"The Christian"
4.	"High Cumberland Dilemma"
5.	"Death Valley Lives"
6.	"Ellis Dee"
7.	"The Hang-Out Gang"
8.	"In the Shelter"
9.	"The Missionary"
10.	"Richard Frost"
11.	"Turnabout"

=== Reviews ===
- Allmusic review

== Best of the Early Years ==
Best of the Early Years is a one-CD compilation including selections from Down to Earth and High Cumberland Jubilee released on Delta Records 46121 in April 2000. It was also issued as a two-CD version by Delta imprint Legend Records 64005 with the second disc being 1999's American Storyteller.

=== One-disc track listing ===
Track listing
No.	Title	Length
1.	"Missionary"
2.	"Truckstop Salvation"
3.	"Ace"
4.	"Rockefeller Square"
5.	"Bend a Little"
6.	"In the Shelter"
7.	"Death Valley Lives"
8.	"High Cumberland Dilemma"
9.	"The Hangout Gang"
10.	"High Cumberland Jubilee"
11.	"There's Nothing Soft about Hard Times"

=== Two-disc track listing ===
Disc 1
No.	Title	Length
1.	"Missionary"
2.	"Truckstop Salvation"
3.	"Ace"
4.	"Rockfeller Square"
5.	"Bend a Little"
6.	"In the Shelter"
7.	"Death Valley Lives"
8.	"High Cumberland Dilemma"
9.	"Hangout Gang"
10.	"High Cumberland Jubilee"
11.	"There's Nothin' Soft about Hard Times"

Disc 2
No.	Title	Length
1.	"The Christian"
2.	"Ellis Dee (He Ain't Free)"
3.	"Richard Frost"
4.	"Mile High in Denver"
5.	"Captain and the Kid"
6.	"Captain America"
7.	"Ain't He a Genius"
8.	"Turnabout"
9.	"I Can't Be Your Hero Today"
10.	"Livingston's Gone to Texas"
11.	"Traveling Clean"
12.	"God Don't Own a Car"

=== Reviews ===
- Allmusic review

== Captain America ==
Captain America is a two-CD compilation of selections from Down to Earth and High Cumberland Jubilee released on Madacy in April 2002.

=== Track listing ===
Disc 1
No.	Title	Length
1.	"There's Nothing Soft about Hard Times"
2.	"Traveling Clean"
3.	"Livingston's Gone to Texas"
4.	"I Can't Be Your Hero Today"
5.	"God Don't Own a Car"
6.	"The Captain and the Kid"
7.	"A Mile High in Denver"
8.	"Ain't He a Genius"
9.	"Captain America"
10.	"High Cumberland Jubilee/Coming Down Slow"
11.	"Rockefeller Square"
12.	"Truckstop Salvation"

Disc 2
No.	Title	Length
1.	"Ace"
2.	"Bend a Little"
3.	"The Christian"
4.	"High Cumberland Dilemma"
5.	"Death Valley Lives"
6.	"Ellis Dee"
7.	"The Hang-Out Gang"
8.	"In the Shelter"
9.	"The Missionary"
10.	"Richard Frost"
11.	"Turnabout"

== Now Yer Squawkin' ==
Now Yer Squawkin' is a two-CD compilation including all of Down to Earth and High Cumberland Jubilee plus "Richard Frost" and "High Cumberland Dilemma" that were not on the original albums. It was released on Recall Records 542 in April 2005.

=== Track listing ===
Disc 1
No.	Title	Length
1.	"The Christian?"
2.	"Ellis Dee (He Ain't Free)"
3.	"Richard Frost"
4.	"The Missionary"
5.	"A Mile High in Denver"
6.	"The Captain and The Kid"
7.	"Captain America"
8.	"Ain't He a Genius"
9.	"Turnabout"
10.	"There's Nothin Soft about Hard Times"
11.	"I Can't Be Your Hero Today"
12.	"Truckstop Salvation"

Disc 2
No.	Title	Length
1.	"Ace"
2.	"Rockefeller Square"
3.	"Bend a Little"
4.	"In the Shelter"
5.	"Death Valley Lives"
6.	"High Cumberland Dilemma"
7.	"Livingston's Gone To Texas"
8.	"England"
9.	"Travelin' Clean"
10.	"The Hangout Gang"
11.	"God Don't Own A Car"
12.	"High Cumberland Jubilee/Comin' Down Slow"

=== Reviews ===
- Allmusic review

== Down to Earth/High Cumberland Jubilee (2005) ==
The 2005 album Down to Earth/High Cumberland Jubilee is a single-CD compilation including all of the original Down to Earth and High Cumberland Jubilee (i.e., without "Richard Frost" and "High Cumberland Dilemma"). It was released in April 2005 on Collectables 7689.

Track listing
No.	Title	Length
1.	"The Christian?"
2.	"Ellis Dee"
3.	"The Missionary"
4.	"A Mile High in Denver"
5.	"The Captain and the Kid"
6.	"Captain America"
7.	"Ain't He a Genius"
8.	"Turnabout"
9.	"There’s Nothin' Soft about Hard Times"
10.	"I Can’t Be Your Hero Today"
11.	"Truckstop Salvation"
12.	"Ace"
13.	"Rockefeller Square"
14.	"Bend a Little"
15.	"In the Shelter"
16.	"Death Valley Lives"
17.	"Livingston's Gone to Texas"
18.	"England"
19.	"Travelin' Clean"
20.	"The Hang-Out Gang"
21.	"God Don’t Own a Car"
22.	"High Cumberland Jubilee/Comin' Down Slow"

=== Reviews ===
- Allmusic review

== Jimmy Buffett (2006) ==
The 2006 album Jimmy Buffett is a two-CD compilation including all of Down to Earth and High Cumberland Jubilee plus "Richard Frost" and "High Cumberland Dilemma" that were not on the original albums. It was released on Madacy 52458 in July 2006 and has the same tracks and track ordering as the two-CD Collector's Edition: There's Nothing Soft About Hard Times from 2000.

Disc 1
No.	Title	Length
1.	"There's Nothing Soft about Hard Times"
2.	"Traveling Clean"
3.	"Livingston's Gone to Texas"
4.	"I Can't Be Your Hero Today"
5.	"God Don't Own a Car"
6.	"The Captain and the Kid"
7.	"A Mile High in Denver"
8.	"Ain't He a Genius"
9.	"Captain America"
10.	"High Cumberland Jubilee/Coming Down Slow"
11.	"Rockefeller Square"
12.	"Truckstop Salvation"

Disc 2
No.	Title	Length
1.	"Ace"
2.	"Bend a Little"
3.	"The Christian"
4.	"High Cumberland Dilemma"
5.	"Death Valley Lives"
6.	"Ellis Dee"
7.	"The Hang-Out Gang"
8.	"In the Shelter"
9.	"The Missionary"
10.	"Richard Frost"
11.	"Turnabout"

== Down to Earth/High Cumberland Jubilee (2007) ==
The 2007 album Down to Earth/High Cumberland Jubilee is a two-CD compilation including all of Down to Earth and High Cumberland Jubilee plus "Richard Frost" and "High Cumberland Dilemma" that were not on the original albums. It was released in May 2007 on Varèse Sarabande 066813.

Disc 1
No.	Title	Length
1.	"The Christian?"
2.	"Ellis Dee (He Ain't Free)"
3.	"Richard Frost"
4.	"The Missionary"
5.	"A Mile High in Denver"
6.	"The Captain and the Kid"
7.	"Captain America"
8.	"Ain't He a Genius"
9.	"Turnabout"
10.	"There's Nothin' Soft about Hard Times"
11.	"I Can't Be Your Hero Today"
12.	"Truckstop Salvation"

Disc 2
No.	Title	Length
1.	"Ace"
2.	"Rockefeller Square"
3.	"Bend a Little"
4.	"In the Shelter"
5.	"Death Valley Lives"
6.	"High Cumberland Dilemma"
7.	"Livingston's Gone to Texas"
8.	"England"
9.	"Travelin' Clean"
10.	"The Hang-Out Gang"
11.	"God Don't Own a Car"
12.	"High Cumberland Jubilee/Comin' Down Slow"

=== Reviews ===
- Allmusic review

== Golden Legends ==
The 2007 album Golden Legends is a compilation including songs from Down to Earth and High Cumberland Jubilee. It was released in May 2007 on Madacy 52979.

Track listing
No.	Title	Length
1.	"The Captain and the Kid"
2.	"A Mile High in Denver"
3.	"There's Nothing Soft about Hard Times"
4.	"I Can't Be Your Hero Today"
5.	"High Cumberland Jubilee/Coming Down Slow"
6.	"Bend a Little"
7.	"Ace"
8.	"God Don't Own a Car"
9.	"Captain America"
10.	"Truckstop Salvation"
11.	"Death Valley Lives"
12.	"Turnabout"
13.	"In the Shelter"
14.	"Ain't He a Genius"

== Ace ==
Ace is a one-CD compilation of selections from Down to Earth and High Cumberland Jubilee released on Neon Records in January 2010.

Track listing
No.	Title	Length
1.	"Ace"
2.	"Rockefeller Square"
3.	"Bend a Little"
4.	"In the Shelter"
5.	"Death Valley Lives"
6.	"High Cumberland Dilemma"
7.	"Livingston's Gone To Texas"
8.	"England"
9.	"Traveling Clean"
10.	"The Hangout Gang"
11.	"God Don't Own a Car"
12.	"Ellis Dee (He Ain't Free)"
13.	"Richard Frost"
14.	"The Missionary"
15.	"A Mile High in Denver"
16.	"The Captain and the Kid"
17.	"Captain America"
18.	"Ain't He a Genius"
19.	"Turnabout"
20.	"There's Nothing Soft About Hard Times"
21.	"Truckstop Salvation"

== Other releases ==
One CD of songs from Down to Earth and High Cumberland Jubilee was released as part of the 2002 three-CD collection Singers Songwriters Legends (Madacy 6897) including music from John Denver and Kenny Rogers.

== See also ==
- Down to Earth
- High Cumberland Jubilee
- Jimmy Buffett discography
- Jimmy Buffett greatest hits compilations
