= Life on the Flip Side =

Studio album by Jimmy Buffett
- Released: May 29, 2020
- Length: 55:05
- Label: Mailboat
- Producer: Mac McAnally, Michael Utley

Jimmy Buffett chronology
| 'Tis the SeaSon (2016) | Life on the Flip Side (2020) | Songs You Don't Know by Heart (2020) |

Life on the Flip Side is the thirtieth studio album by American singer-songwriter Jimmy Buffett. The album was released on May 29, 2020, by Mailboat Records.

Professional ratings
Review scores
| Source | Rating |
|---|---|
| AllMusic | 3.5/5 stars |
| American Songwriter | 4/5 stars |
| Rolling Stone | 3/5 stars |

== Commercial performance ==
Life on the Flip Side debuted at number two on the US Billboard 200 with 75,000 album-equivalent units (including 74,000 pure album sales), marking the singer's twelfth top 10 album and highest-charting album in over 15 years.

== Track listing ==
| No. | Title | Writer(s) | Length |
|---|---|---|---|
| 1. | "Down at the Lah De Dah" | Jimmy Buffett; Paul Brady; Ralph Murphy | 3:19 |
| 2. | "Who Gets to Live Like This" | Buffett; Mac McAnally; Lukas Nelson | 3:02 |
| 3. | "The Devil I Know" | Buffett; McAnally | 2:58 |
| 4. | "The Slow Lane" | Buffett; Will Kimbrough; Dave Zohl; Johnny Duke | 4:10 |
| 5. | "Cussin' Island" | Buffett | 4:54 |
| 6. | "Oceans of Time" | Brady; Sharon Vaughn | 3:31 |
| 7. | "Hey, That's My Wave" | Buffett; McAnally; Glenn Goodman | 4:26 |
| 8. | "The World Is What You Make It" | Brady | 3:43 |
| 9. | "Half Drunk" | Kimbrough; Brigitte DeMeyer | 3:53 |
| 10. | "Mailbox Money" | Buffett; Kimbrough | 4:19 |
| 11. | "Slack Tide" | Buffett; Peter Mayer; Kimbrough | 4:16 |
| 12. | "Live, Like It's Your Last Day" | Buffett; McAnally | 3:57 |
| 13. | "15 Cuban Minutes" | Buffett; Michael Utley; Enrique Murciano | 5:14 |
| 14. | "Book on the Shelf" | Buffett; Erin McAnally; Mick Utley | 3:23 |
| Total length: | | | 55:05 |

== Charts ==
=== Weekly charts ===
Chart performance for Life on the Flip Side
| Chart (2020) | Peak position |
|---|---|
| US Billboard 200 | 2 |
| US Top Country Albums (Billboard) | 1 |

=== Year-end charts ===
Year-end chart performance for Life on the Flip Side
| Chart (2020) | Position |
|---|---|
| US Top Country Albums (Billboard) | 58 |
