= One Particular Harbour =

Studio album by Jimmy Buffett
- Released: September 1983
- Studio: A&R (New York City); Record Plant (Los Angeles); Studio "O" (Papeete, Tahiti); Village Recorders (Los Angeles)
- Genre: Country rock; Gulf and Western
- Length: 39:58
- Label: MCA; MCA-5447 (US, 12")
- Producer: Jimmy Buffett, Michael Utley

Jimmy Buffett chronology
Somewhere over China (1982)	One Particular Harbour (1983)	Riddles in the Sand (1984)

One Particular Harbour is the twelfth studio album by American singer-songwriter Jimmy Buffett. It was released in September 1983 as MCA 5447 and was produced by Buffett and Michael Utley. It was Buffett's first involvement producing an album. "Stars on the Water" was a minor hit for its original writer, country music songsmith Rodney Crowell and was later covered by fellow country music singer George Strait on his 2001 album, The Road Less Traveled.

== Songs ==
In addition to songs written or co-written by Buffett (including one with JD Souther and Josh Leo), the album includes four cover songs: "Stars on the Water" by country songwriter Rodney Crowell, "California Promises" by Steve Goodman, "Brown Eyed Girl" by Van Morrison, and "Why You Wanna Hurt My Heart?" written by the Neville Brothers' Art Neville. Buffett's version of "Stars on the Water" also appeared on the soundtrack to the 1993 movie The Firm.

== Chart performance ==
One Particular Harbour reached No. 59 on the Billboard 200 album chart and No. 35 on the Billboard Top Country Albums chart. The song "One Particular Harbour" hit No. 22 Adult Contemporary and "Brown Eyed Girl" made it to No. 13 Adult Contemporary.

Chart (1983)	Peak position
U.S. Billboard Top Country Albums	35
U.S. Billboard 200	59

== Critical reception ==
Professional ratings
Review scores
Source	Rating
AllMusic	3/5 stars

AllMusic reviewer Ronnie D. Lankford, Jr. says One Particular Harbour was something like a comeback, with Buffett's best batch of songs since Son of a Son of a Sailor in 1978". The title single, "One Particular Harbour," is a fan favorite, and is sometimes considered part of "The Big 8" that Buffett has played at almost all of his concerts.

== Track listing ==
"One Particular Harbour"
The title song and first single from One Particular Harbour

Side 1
No.	Title	Writer(s)	Length
1.	"Stars on the Water"	Rodney Crowell	3:16
2.	"I Used to Have Money One Time"	Jimmy Buffett, Michael Utley	3:25
3.	"Livin' It Up"	Jimmy Buffett, Josh Leo, JD Souther	2:59
4.	"California Promises"	Steve Goodman	3:42
5.	"One Particular Harbour"	Jimmy Buffett, Bobby Holcomb	5:44

Side 2
No.	Title	Writer(s)	Length
6.	"Why You Wanna Hurt My Heart?"	Arthur Neville	2:42
7.	"Honey Do"	Jimmy Buffett, Michael Utley	4:32
8.	"We Are the People Our Parents Warned Us About"	Jimmy Buffett	3:21
9.	"Twelve Volt Man"	Jimmy Buffett	4:00
10.	"Brown Eyed Girl"	Van Morrison	3:55
11.	"Distantly in Love"	Jimmy Buffett	2:53

== Personnel ==
The Coral Reefer Band:

- Jimmy Buffett – lead vocals, acoustic rhythm guitar
- Michael Utley – piano, organ, synthesizer, arrangements
- Josh Leo – backing vocals, electric guitar, acoustic guitar, mandolin (track 11)
- Sam Clayton – backing vocals, congas, percussion
- Bob Glaub – bass
- Russ Kunkel – drums
- Robert Greenidge – steel drums
- Errol "Crusher" Bennett – percussion, congas (track 5)
- Matt Betton – drums (track 7), saxophone (track 7)
- Danny Burns – backing vocals, bass (track 3)
- Alan Estes – percussion
- David Jackson – upright bass (track 7)
- Earl Klugh – gut-string guitar (track 4)
- Vince Melamed – backing vocals, synthesizer (track 3)
- The Blues Torpedoes - saxophones (track 7)
- Jim Shea — Pahue and Toere drums (track 5)
- Thom Mooney – drums (track 3)
- Frank Bama, Bonnie Bramlett, Rita Coolidge, David Lasley, Debra McColl, Arnold McCuller, Timothy B. Schmit, The Chorale Epherona – background vocals

Others

- Arranger - Michael Utley
- Mixer - Elliot Scheiner
- Engineers - Elliot Scheiner, Cliff Jones, Robin Laine, Paul Broucek, Scott James, Jim Scott, Kirk Butler, Dave Huston

== Singles ==
- "One Particular Harbour" b/w "Distantly in Love" (Released on MCA 52298 in October 1983)
- "Brown Eyed Girl" b/w "Twelve Volt Man" (Released on MCA 52333 in January 1984)
