= Down to Earth (Jimmy Buffett album) =

Studio album by Jimmy Buffett
- Released: August 11, 1970
- Recorded: 1970
- Genre: Folk rock; country rock
- Length: 39:22
- Label: Barnaby
- Producer: Travis Turk

Jimmy Buffett chronology
Down to Earth (1970)	High Cumberland Jubilee (1971)

Singles from Down to Earth
- 1. "The Christian" b/w "Richard Frost" Released: c. May 1970; 2. "Ellis Dee (He Ain't Free)" b/w "There's Nothing Soft about Hard Times"" Released: c. September 1970; 3. "Captain America" (alternate take) b/w "Truckstop Salvation" Released: January 1971

Professional ratings
Review scores
Source	Rating
Allmusic	4/5 stars

Down to Earth is the debut studio album by American popular music singer-songwriter Jimmy Buffett. It was produced by Travis Turk and was released on August 11, 1970 on Andy Williams's Barnaby Records label as Z 30093. A compact disc was released by Varèse Sarabande in June 1998.

== Songs ==
All of the songs on Down to Earth were written or co-written by Buffett. "The Captain and the Kid" was re-recorded thrice by Buffett: Havaña Daydreamin', Meet Me in Margaritaville: The Ultimate Collection and Songs You Don't Know by Heart.

The folk-rock style of music and lyrics on Down to Earth and High Cumberland Jubilee differ greatly from Buffett's subsequent output. There is less of the country music feel and little of the Gulf and Western, Key-West-influenced sound and themes that have defined his musical career. Allmusic reviewer William Ruhlmann notes that "this is not the freewheeling Jimmy Buffett of 'Margaritaville,' but rather a thoughtful folk-rock singer/songwriter of the early '70s, earnestly strumming an acoustic guitar over a rhythm section and singing lyrics of social consciousness with sly references to drugs".

The material on this album has been included on numerous compilations of Buffett's early material.

An alternate take of "Captain America" was released as the third single from the album.

== Alternate versions ==
The 1998 re-release of the album contained an additional track, "Richard Frost," which was recorded during sessions for the album and released as the B-side of "The Christian?" single.

== Track listings ==
=== Original release ===
All tracks are written by Jimmy Buffett except where indicated.

Side A
No.	Title	Writer(s)	Length
1.	"The Christian?"	Milton Brown, Jimmy Buffett	3:54
2.	"Ellis Dee (He Ain't Free)"	Jimmy Buffett, Buzz Cason	2:50
3.	"The Missionary"		3:33
4.	"A Mile High in Denver"		3:07
5.	"The Captain and the Kid"		3:18

Side B
No.	Title	Length
6.	"Captain America"	3:28
7.	"Ain't He a Genius"	2:43
8.	"Turnabout"	4:20
9.	"There's Nothin' Soft About Hard Times"	3:23
10.	"I Can't Be Your Hero Today"	2:58
11.	"Truckstop Salvation"	5:48

=== 1998 re-release ===
All tracks are written by Jimmy Buffett except where indicated.

No.	Title	Writer(s)	Length
1.	"The Christian?"	Milton Brown, Jimmy Buffett	3:54
2.	"Ellis Dee (He Ain't Free)"	Jimmy Buffett, Buzz Cason	2:50
3.	"Richard Frost"		3:29
4.	"The Missionary"		3:33
5.	"A Mile High in Denver"		3:07
6.	"The Captain and the Kid"		3:18
7.	"Captain America"		3:28
8.	"Ain't He a Genius"		2:43
9.	"Turnabout"		4:20
10.	"There's Nothin' Soft about Hard Times"		3:23
11.	"I Can't Be Your Hero Today"		2:58
12.	"Truckstop Salvation"		5:48

== Personnel ==
- Jimmy Buffett – lead and backing vocals, guitar, kazoo
- Lanny Fiel – guitar, piano
- Bob Cook – guitar, bass, harmonica
- Dave Haney – bass
- Carl Himmel – drums
- Paul Tabet – drums
- Travis Turk – drums, kazoo
- Buzz Cason – backing vocals

Technical

- Travis Turk – producer, engineer

== Singles ==
- "The Christian?" b/w "Richard Frost" (Released on Barnaby ZS7-2013 circa May 1970)
- "Ellis Dee (He Ain't Free)" b/w "There's Nothing Soft about Hard Times" (Released on Barnaby ZS7-2019 circa September 1970)
- "Captain America" b/w "Truckstop Salvation" (Released on Barnaby ZS7-2023 in January 1971)
