= Live in Auburn, WA =

Live in Auburn

Live album by Jimmy Buffett
- Released: November 4, 2003
- Recorded: White River Amphitheatre, Auburn, Washington (September 16, 2003)
- Genre: Country rock; Gulf and Western
- Label: Mailboat
- Producer: Michael Utley

Live in Auburn is a live album by the American singer-songwriter Jimmy Buffett and is one of a number of Jimmy Buffett sound board live albums recorded directly from the mixing console without further editing, thus resembling bootleg recordings.

The album was recorded at White River Amphitheatre in Auburn, Washington, on September 16, 2003, on Buffett's Tiki Time Tour. It was released in November 2003 on two compact discs by Mailboat Records. It was produced by Michael Utley, a member of Buffett's Coral Reefer Band.

== Songs ==
The album includes all of the songs in Buffett's "Big 8" songs that he nearly always performs in concert. Due to the location and timing of the concert, Buffett performed several related songs including: the only performance ever of "I Still Miss Someone", dedicated to Johnny Cash who died four days earlier; the first performance and only tour appearance of "The Wind Cries Mary", dedicated to Jimi Hendrix who lived in Washington. Buffett also mentions that "In The Shelter" was written about a girl from Spokane.

Buffett mentions that "Burn That Bridge" is from Riddles in the Sand, to which Michael Utley replies, "That's right!" Buffett has been known to do a terrific job of playing a variety of all kinds of songs from his catalog whether it be new, old, hits or obscure songs. However, he has been known to do a bad job at keeping track of which songs appear on which albums, which explains why Utley was impressed. The following song in the setlist, "Knees Of My Heart", is also on Riddles in the Sand. In addition, "Changes in Latitudes, Changes in Attitudes" and "Tampico Trauma" both appear back-to-back in the setlist and also appear on Changes in Latitudes, Changes in Attitudes, and "Volcano" and "Fins" both appear back-to-back in the setlist and are the first two tracks on Volcano (but in reversed order). These are assumed to be a coincidence.

While not part of "The Big 8", "Brown Eyed Girl" and "Southern Cross" are almost always played in concert. The two songs were probably dropped from numerous shows during the 2003 Tour due to several other covers being performed, such as Johnny Clegg's "Great Heart", James Taylor's "Mexico", Don Tiki's "The Natives Are Restless", John Hiatt's "The Tiki Bar is Open", Fred Neil's "Everybody's Talkin'" and Coral Reefer Mac McAnally's "It's My Job".

Buffett also performed what is the first official live release of "I Don't Know (Spicoli's Theme)", a song he wrote and recorded for the film Fast Times at Ridgemont High, which he mistakes as being its first performance ever. However, it was actually performed at least four times before (three times during his 1982 tour and once during his 1997 Havana Daydreamin' Tour).

Also notable is "Far Side of the World" appearing in the encore section.

== Chart performance ==
Live in Auburn reached No. 27 on the Independent Albums chart in the US.

== Track listing ==
Disc 1
No.	Title	Writer(s)	Length
1.	"Great Heart"	Johnny Clegg	5:37
2.	"Saxophones"	Jimmy Buffett	4:58
3.	"Gypsies in the Palace"	Jimmy Buffett, Glenn Frey, Will Jennings	6:31
4.	"In the Shelter"	Jimmy Buffett	4:57
5.	"Grapefruit-Juicy Fruit"	Jimmy Buffett	3:47
6.	"Son of a Son of a Sailor"	Jimmy Buffett	4:09
7.	"Knees of My Heart"	Jimmy Buffett, Will Jennings, Michael Utley	3:51
8.	"Burn that Bridge"	Jimmy Buffett, Will Jennings, Michael Utley	4:37
9.	"Come Monday"	Jimmy Buffett	5:22
10.	"Natives are Restless"	Don Tiki	4:31
11.	"It’s Five O'Clock Somewhere"	Jim Brown, Don Rollins	5:02
12.	"One Particular Harbour"	Jimmy Buffett, Bobby Holcomb	6:26
13.	"Cheeseburger in Paradise"	Jimmy Buffett	3:34

Disc 2
No.	Title	Writer(s)	Length
1.	"Tiki Bar is Open"	John Hiatt	5:08
2.	"Everybody’s Talkin’"	Fred Neil	4:17
3.	"Why Don't We Get Drunk"	Marvin Gardens	4:56
4.	"I Still Miss Someone"	Johnny Cash, Roy Cash	3:56
5.	"It’s My Job"	Mac McAnally	4:04
6.	"I Don’t Know (Spicoli’s Theme)"	Jimmy Buffett, Michael Utley	3:32
7.	"A Pirate Looks at Forty"	Jimmy Buffett	4:46
8.	"Changes in Latitudes, Changes in Attitudes"	Jimmy Buffett	3:27
9.	"Tampico Trauma"	Jimmy Buffett	5:22
10.	"Mexico"	James Taylor	4:03
11.	"Margaritaville"	Jimmy Buffett	4:37
12.	"Volcano"	Jimmy Buffett, Keith Sykes, Harry Dailey	4:01
13.	"Fins"	Jimmy Buffett, Barry Chance, Tom Corcoran, Debroah McColl	7:02
14.	"Far Side of the World"	Jimmy Buffett	5:18
15.	"The Wind Cries Mary"	Jimi Hendrix	4:26

== Original setlist ==
Instead of track listings on the back of the case, Live in Auburn, WA, Live in Las Vegas, NV, Live in Manfield, MA and Live in Cincinnati, OH all came with Buffett's handwritten setlist. Because he changes setlists from show to show to please die-hard parrotheads and/or fit well with the locals, there are a few significant differences between what appears on the setlist included in the CD, and what is actually on the CD.

Notable changes from the Live in Auburn, WA handwritten setlist to the actual performance:

- "Gypsies in the Palace" appears as "Gypsies in Cowgirls", a reference to the dancers who dressed as cowgirls during the performance.
- "Knees of My Heart" and "Pencil Thin Mustache" were in a slot. "Knees of My Heart" was chosen to be played.
- "Mental Floss" was crossed out, and "I Still Miss Someone" was inserted.
- "Tampico Trauma", "A Pirate Looks at Forty" and "Changes in Latitudes, Changes in Attitudes" were switched around in the original setlist.
- There's a check-mark next to "I Don't Know (Spicoli's Theme)" and "The Wind Cries Mary", indicating that they have not played those songs as a band before.
- Buffett notes Mount St. Helens next to "Volcano" to remember to reference it during the performance.
- Buffett writes that "Brown Eyed Girl" or "Southern Cross" may be played optionally during the first encore, between "Fins" and "Far Side of the World". Neither were played.

== Personnel ==
The Coral Reefer Band:

- Jimmy Buffett – vocals, guitar
- Mac McAnally – vocals, guitar
- Peter Mayer: lead guitar
- Tina Gullickson: vocals, acoustic rhythm guitar
- Nadirah Shakoor: vocals
- Robert Greendige: steel drums
- Michael Utley – keyboards
- Ralph MacDonald: percussion
- Jim Mayer: bass guitar
- Roger Guth: drums
- Doyle Grisham: pedal steel guitar
- Amy Lee: saxophone
- T.C. Mitchell: saxophone
- John Lovell: trumpet
