= Boats, Beaches, Bars & Ballads =

Box set by Jimmy Buffett
- Released: May 19, 1992
- Recorded: 1972–1990
- Genres: Country rock; Gulf and Western
- Length: 264:42
- Labels: MCA; MCAD4-10613 (U.S., CD)
- Producer: Various

Jimmy Buffett chronology
Feeding Frenzy: Jimmy Buffett Live! (1990)	Boats, Beaches, Bars & Ballads (1992)	Before the Beach (1993)

Professional ratings
Review scores
Source	Rating
AllMusic	4.5/5 stars
Entertainment Weekly	C+
The Rolling Stone Album Guide	4/5 stars

Boats, Beaches, Bars & Ballads is a four disc compilation box set of Jimmy Buffett and the Coral Reefer Band's greatest hits, rarities, and previously unreleased songs. It covers the highlights of his career over the fifteen albums he issued from 1973 to 1992 (and some other material recorded during that timespan), and does not include any material from his first two recorded LPs. Released in 1992, the collection received Recording Industry Association of America quadruple platinum certification in 2001.

== Track listing ==
=== Disc one: Boats ===
Boats is the boat and sailing-themed disc. "Love and Luck" was previously unreleased on a Buffett album. "Take It Back," written for the US America's Cup yachting team, was previously available only as a single release. "Love and Luck" would later appear on the live album, Tuesdays, Thursdays, and Saturdays.

Boats (disc one)
No.	Title	Writer(s)	Album	Length
1.	"Son of a Son of a Sailor"	Jimmy Buffett	Son of a Son of a Sailor	3:23
2.	"Havana Daydreamin'"	Buffett	Havana Daydreamin'	3:39
3.	"Mañana"	Buffett	Son of a Son of a Sailor	4:13
4.	"Treat Her Like a Lady"	Buffett	Volcano	4:16
5.	"Steamer"	Buffett	Somewhere over China	4:09
6.	"Jolly Mon Sing"	Buffett; Will Jennings; Michael Utley	Last Mango in Paris	3:15
7.	"Nautical Wheelers"	Buffett	A1A	3:35
8.	"Take It Back"	Buffett; Matt Betton	Non-album single	3:59
9.	"On a Slow Boat to China"	Frank Loesser	Somewhere over China	3:58
10.	"Changes in Latitudes, Changes in Attitudes"	Buffett	Changes in Latitudes, Changes in Attitudes	3:15
11.	"Love and Luck"	Buffett; Jocelyne Béroard; Jean-Claude Naimro	Previously unreleased	4:48
12.	"The Captain and the Kid"	Buffett	Havana Daydreamin'	3:14
13.	"Trying to Reason with Hurricane Season"	Buffett	A1A	4:21
14.	"Boat Drinks"	Buffett	Volcano	2:38
15.	"One Particular Harbour"	Buffett; Bobby Holcomb	One Particular Harbour	5:37
16.	"A Pirate Looks at Forty"	Buffett	A1A	3:51
17.	"Lovely Cruise"	Jonathan Baham	Changes in Latitudes, Changes in Attitudes	3:54
Total length:				66:05

=== Disc two: Beaches ===
Beaches is the beach and ocean-themed disc. Of the 18 beach songs, notable songs are "Margaritaville," also known as the Buffett signature song, and "Cheeseburger in Paradise". "Money Back Guarantee" was previously unreleased on a Buffett album. "Christmas in the Caribbean" was previously released on the 1985 country music Christmas compilation album Tennessee Christmas.

Beaches (disc two)
No.	Title	Writer(s)	Album	Length
1.	"Margaritaville"	Buffett	Changes in Latitudes, Changes in Attitudes	4:10
2.	"Grapefruit—Juicy Fruit"	Buffett	A White Sport Coat and a Pink Crustacean	2:54
3.	"Ragtop Day"	Buffett	Riddles in the Sand	3:06
4.	"Frank and Lola"	Buffett; Steve Goodman	Last Mango in Paris	3:15
5.	"Tin Cup Chalice"	Buffett	A1A	3:37
6.	"Knees of My Heart"	Buffett; Jennings; Utley	Riddles in the Sand	3:15
7.	"Money Back Guarantee"	Buffett; Jennings; Utley	Previously unreleased	4:24
8.	"When the Coast Is Clear"	Buffett; Mac McAnally	Floridays	2:56
9.	"Biloxi"	Jesse Winchester	Changes in Latitudes, Changes in Attitudes	5:38
10.	"Distantly in Love"	Buffett	One Particular Harbour	2:49
11.	"Coconut Telegraph"	Buffett	Coconut Telegraph	2:58
12.	"Stars on the Water"	Rodney Crowell	One Particular Harbour	3:16
13.	"Who's the Blonde Stranger?"	Buffett; Jennings; Utley; Josh Leo	Riddles in the Sand	3:45
14.	"I Have Found Me a Home"	Buffett	A White Sport Coat and a Pink Crustacean	3:53
15.	"Christmas in the Caribbean"	Buffett; Jennings; Utley; Marshall Chapman; Diana Haig	Tennessee Christmas	3:10
16.	"Volcano"	Buffett; Harry Dailey; Keith Sykes	Volcano	3:37
17.	"Brown Eyed Girl"	Van Morrison	One Particular Harbour	3:53
18.	"Cheeseburger in Paradise"	Buffett	Son of a Son of a Sailor	2:51
Total length:				63:27

=== Disc three: Bars ===
Bars is the drinking and party songs-themed disc. Beginning with "Fins", the album also includes "Why Don't We Get Drunk (And Screw)?" and "Pencil Thin Mustache." "Elvis Imitators," an attempt at an Elvis Presley rockabilly song, written by Steve Goodman and Mike Smith, and "Domino College" were both previously unreleased on a Buffett album. "Fins" and "Cuban Crime of Passion" were co-written with novelist Tom Corcoran.

Bars (disc three)
No.	Title	Writer(s)	Album	Length
1.	"Fins"	Buffett; Barry Chance; Tom Corcoran; Deborah McColl	Volcano	3:25
2.	"The Weather Is Here, Wish You Were Beautiful"	Buffett	Coconut Telegraph	4:07
3.	"Tampico Trauma"	Buffett	Changes in Latitudes, Changes in Attitudes	4:35
4.	"Livingston Saturday Night"	Buffett	Son of a Son of a Sailor / Rancho Deluxe soundtrack	3:09
5.	"Cuban Crime of Passion"	Buffett; Corcoran	A White Sport Coat and a Pink Crustacean	3:38
6.	"First Look"	Buffett	Floridays	3:53
7.	"The Wino and I Know"	Buffett	Living and Dying in 3/4 Time	3:02
8.	"The Great Filling Station Holdup"	Buffett	A White Sport Coat and a Pink Crustacean	3:01
9.	"Why Don't We Get Drunk (And Screw)?"	Buffett	A White Sport Coat and a Pink Crustacean	2:42
10.	"Elvis Imitators"	Goodman; Mike Smith	Previously unreleased	2:18
11.	"Pencil Thin Mustache"	Buffett	Living and Dying in 3/4 Time	2:50
12.	"Kick It in Second Wind"	Buffett; Jennings; Timothy B. Schmit	Havana Daydreamin'	3:56
13.	"Desperation Samba (Halloween in Tijuana)"	Buffett	Last Mango in Paris	3:29
14.	"When Salome Plays the Drum"	Buffett	Somewhere over China	3:28
15.	"They Don't Dance like Carmen No More"	Buffett	A White Sport Coat and a Pink Crustacean	2:53
16.	"The Pascagoula Run"	Buffett; Jay Oliver	Off to See the Lizard	3:20
17.	"Sending the Old Man Home"	Buffett	Volcano	3:22
18.	"Domino College"	Buffett; Dan Fogelberg	Previously unreleased	3:55
Total length:				61:03

=== Disc four: Ballads ===
Ballads is the ballads and love song-themed disc. The most notable songs are "Come Monday" and "He Went to Paris". This collection includes a remix of "I Heard I Was in Town", not the version that appears on Somewhere over China. "Middle of the Night" was previously unreleased on a Buffett album. "Everlasting Moon" is a previously unissued live recording from the same concerts that were heard on Buffett's 1990 live album, Feeding Frenzy.

Ballads (disc four)
No.	Title	Writer(s)	Album	Length
1.	"Come Monday"	Buffett	Living and Dying in 3/4 Time	3:07
2.	"Defying Gravity"	Winchester	Havana Daydreamin'	2:40
3.	"Survive"	Buffett; Utley	Volcano	4:47
4.	"Incommunicado"	Buffett; McColl; M.L. Benoit	Coconut Telegraph	3:40
5.	"I Heard I Was in Town"	Buffett; Utley	Somewhere over China	3:36
6.	"Ballad of Spider John"	Willis Alan Ramsey	Living and Dying in 3/4 Time	4:27
7.	"Little Miss Magic"	Buffett	Coconut Telegraph	4:01
8.	"California Promises"	Goodman	One Particular Harbour	3:39
9.	"If the Phone Doesn't Ring, It's Me"	Buffett; Jennings; Utley	Last Mango in Paris	3:25
10.	"African Friend"	Buffett	Son of a Son of a Sailor	4:00
11.	"Everlasting Moon"	Buffett; Betton	Previously unreleased	3:54
12.	"Pre-You"	Buffett; Ralph MacDonald; William Salter	Hot Water	5:17
13.	"Middle of the Night"	Buffett; Jennings; Utley; Art Neville	Previously unreleased	3:14
14.	"The Coast of Marseilles"	Sykes	Son of a Son of a Sailor	5:00
15.	"Island"	Buffett; Dave Loggins	Coconut Telegraph	3:54
16.	"He Went to Paris"	Buffett	A White Sport Coat and a Pink Crustacean	3:29
17.	"Stars Fell on Alabama"	Michael Parish; Frank Perkins	Coconut Telegraph	4:13
18.	"Changing Channels"	Buffett; McAnally	Off to See the Lizard	3:30
19.	"Twelve Volt Man"	Buffett	One Particular Harbour	3:57
Total length:				73:50

== Charts ==
Chart performance for Boats, Beaches, Bars & Ballads
Chart (1992–2023)	Peak position
US Billboard 200	53
