= Live at Fenway Park =

Live album by Jimmy Buffett
- Released: November 15, 2005
- Recorded: Fenway Park ballpark, Boston, Massachusetts (10 and September 12, 2004)
- Genres: Country rock; Gulf and Western
- Labels: Mailboat; 2115 (US, 2 CDs + 1 DVD)
- Producer: Michael Utley

Professional ratings
Review scores
Source	Rating
Allmusic	3.5/5 stars

Live at Fenway Park is a live album by American singer-songwriter Jimmy Buffett. It is one of a number of Jimmy Buffett sound board live albums recorded directly from the mixing console without further editing, in this sense resembling bootleg recordings.

The album was recorded at Fenway Park ballpark in Boston, Massachusetts on September 10 and 12, 2004, two dates on Buffett's License to Chill Tour. It was released in November 2005 on two compact discs on Mailboat 2115 and includes a DVD containing 55 minutes of footage from the two shows. It was produced by Michael Utley, a member of Buffett's Coral Reefer Band.

== Songs ==
The album includes all of the songs in Buffett's "Big 8" songs that he nearly always performs in concert. Due to the location of the concert in the home stadium of Major League Baseball's Boston Red Sox, Buffett performed several related songs including baseball anthem "Take Me Out to the Ball Game," Red Sox' fan favorite "Sweet Caroline," originally by Neil Diamond, and "Respect," made popular by Aretha Franklin, alluding to the Red Sox success in 2004 (they would go on to win the 2004 World Series) after years of poor performance. While performing "Scarlet Begonias," Buffett changed the lyrics in the final line of the song from "everybody's playing in the heart of gold band," to "everybody's playing in the Fenway Park band," referencing the venue. Buffett also performed "Boat Drinks" which he says is the only of his songs written in and about Boston.

== Chart performance ==
Live at Fenway Park hit No. 41 on the American Billboard 200 album chart and No. 2 on the Independent Albums chart.

=== Track listing ===
Disc 1
No.	Title	Writer(s)	Length
1.	"Changes in Latitudes, Changes in Attitudes"	Jimmy Buffett	3:44
2.	"The Great Filling Station Holdup"	Jimmy Buffett	4:23
3.	"Pencil Thin Mustache"	Jimmy Buffett	3:27
4.	"Fruitcakes"	Jimmy Buffett, Amy Lee	6:25
5.	"License to Chill"	Jimmy Buffett, Mac McAnally, Al Anderson	4:17
6.	"Son of a Son of a Sailor"	Jimmy Buffett	4:18
7.	"Boat Drinks"	Jimmy Buffett	4:17
8.	"Brown Eyed Girl"	Van Morrison	5:59
9.	"Volcano"	Jimmy Buffett, Keith Sykes, Harry Dailey	4:08
10.	"Why Don't We Get Drunk / Sweet Caroline"	Jimmy Buffett / Neil Diamond	5:05
11.	"Hey Good Lookin'"	Hank Williams	3:35
12.	"Pascagoula Run"	Jimmy Buffett, Jay Oliver	4:09
13.	"One Particular Harbour"	Jimmy Buffett, Bobby Holcomb	6:55

Disc 2
No.	Title	Writer(s)	Length
1.	"Respect"	Otis Redding	2:47
2.	"Gypsies in the Palace"	Jimmy Buffett, Glenn Frey, Will Jennings	5:38
3.	"Grapefruit Juicy Fruit"	Jimmy Buffett	4:03
4.	"Come Monday"	Jimmy Buffett	4:27
5.	"Jolly Mon Sing"	Jimmy Buffett, Michael Utley, Will Jennings	5:02
6.	"Take Me Out to the Ball Game"	Jack Norworth, Albert Von Tilzer	1:44
7.	"It's Five O'Clock Somewhere"	Jim "Moose" Brown, Don Rollins	3:44
8.	"Cheeseburger in Paradise"	Jimmy Buffett	3:42
9.	"Coast of Carolina"	Jimmy Buffett, Mac McAnally	4:26
10.	"Cuban Crime of Passion"	Jimmy Buffett, Tom Corcoran	5:26
11.	"A Pirate Looks at Forty"	Jimmy Buffett	4:57
12.	"Piece of Work"	William A. Kimbrough	4:14
13.	"Margaritaville"	Jimmy Buffett	4:51
14.	"Fins"	Jimmy Buffett, Barry Chance, Tom Corcoran, Deborah McColl	7:46
15.	"Scarlet Begonias"	Jerry Garcia, Robert Hunter	4:10
16.	"Southern Cross"	Stephen Stills, Richard Curtis, Michael Curtis	4:58
17.	"Defying Gravity"	Jesse Winchester	3:34

DVD track listing
No.	Title	Length
1.	"Take Me Out to the Ball Game"
2.	"Jump in Line"
3.	"License to Chill"
4.	"Boat Drinks"
5.	"Fruitcakes"
6.	"Son of a Son of a Sailor"
7.	"Why We Don't Get Drunk / Sweet Caroline"
8.	"Respect"
9.	"Jolly Mon Sing"
10.	"Coast of Carolina"
11.	"Cuban Crime of Passion"
12.	"Southern Cross"
13.	"Defying Gravity"

== Personnel ==
The Coral Reefer Band:

- Jimmy Buffett – vocals, guitar
- Peter Mayer – guitar
- Tina Gullickson – vocals
- Nadirah Shakoor — vocals
- Robert Greenidge — steel drums
- Michael Utley — keyboards
- Ralph MacDonald — percussion
- Jim Mayer – bass guitar
- Roger Guth – drums
- Mac McAnally — guitar, vocals
- Doyle Grisham – steel guitar
- Amy Lee — Saxophone
- T.C. Mitchell – saxophone
- John Lovell – trumpet

Special guests

- Sonny Landreth — guitar
- Bill Payne — keyboards
- Dr. Charles Steinberg – organ on "Take Me Out to the Ball Game"
