= Hot Water (album) =

Studio album by Jimmy Buffett
- Released: June 20, 1988
- Studio: Shrimpboat Sound (Key West); New River (Fort Lauderdale); Criteria (Miami); Rosebud (New York); Hit Factory (New York); Coral Sound (Port of Spain, Trinidad and Tobago); Clinton Sound (New York)
- Genre: Country rock; Gulf and Western
- Length: 46:51
- Label: MCA; MCA-42093 (US, CD)
- Producer: Michael Utley; Russell Kunkel; Ralph MacDonald

Jimmy Buffett chronology
Floridays (1986)	Hot Water (1988)	Off to See the Lizard (1989)

Professional ratings
Review scores
Source	Rating
Allmusic	3/5 stars

Hot Water is the sixteenth studio album by American popular music singer-songwriter Jimmy Buffett. It was released in June 1988 by MCA 42093 and was produced by Coral Reefer Band members Michael Utley, Russell Kunkel, and Ralph MacDonald. The album was engineered and mixed by Jay Rifkin. The album was Jimmy's first album recorded at his new studio in Key West, Florida called Shrimpboat Sound. The LP continues Buffett's use of a wide variety of musical instruments than was typical for Buffett's earlier works, notably horns and percussion. Buffett shaved off his trademark mustache for the album.

== Songs ==
All but two of the album's songs were written or co-written by Buffett. The other two songs are cover songs: "Great Heart" originally by South African Johnny Clegg and Savuka and "L'Air de la Louisiane" by Jesse Winchester, one of several Buffett covers of Winchester songs recorded throughout his career. "L'Air de la Louisiane" An admitted francophile, Buffett has sung several songs in French. The album's Final Song, "That's What Living is to Me" references Mark Twain's Travelogue "Following the Equator" and Jimmy often included praise and recommendation of the book when introducing live performances of the song.

== Chart performance ==
Hot Water reached No. 46 on the Billboard 200 album chart. The song "Bring Back the Magic" hit No. 24 Adult Contemporary.

== Track listing ==
Hot Water track listing
No.	Title	Writer(s)	Length
1.	"Homemade Music"	Jimmy Buffett, Michael Utley, Russell Kunkel	3:32
2.	"Baby's Gone Shoppin'"	Jimmy Buffett	4:05
3.	"Bring Back the Magic"	Jimmy Buffett, Will Jennings	4:16
4.	"My Barracuda"	Jimmy Buffett, Michael Utley, Russell Kunkel, Steve Cropper	3:37
5.	"L'Air de la Louisiane"	Jesse Winchester	2:59
6.	"Prince of Tides"	Jimmy Buffett, Michael Utley	5:30
7.	"Pre-You"	Jimmy Buffett, Ralph MacDonald, William Salter	5:19
8.	"King of Somewhere Hot"	Jimmy Buffett, Ralph MacDonald, William Salter, Robert Greenidge	5:05
9.	"Great Heart"	Johnny Clegg	5:06
10.	"Smart Woman (In a Real Short Skirt)"	Jimmy Buffett, Marshall Chapman	2:49
11.	"That's What Living Is to Me"	Jimmy Buffett	4:33

== Personnel ==
The Coral Reefer Band:

- Jimmy Buffett – lead vocals, acoustic and electric guitar
- Steve Cropper – electric guitar
- Hugh McCracken – acoustic guitar, mandolin, dobro, bass harmonica & lead guitar on "Prince of Tides"
- Jeff Mironov – electric guitar on "Pre-You"
- Russ Kunkel – drums, percussion
- Buddy Williams – drums on "King of Somewhere Hot" and "Pre-You"
- Michael Utley – keyboards, organ, synthesizer
- Steve Winwood – organ, background vocals on "My Barracuda"
- Richard Tee – piano on "Pre-You"
- Donald Dunn – bass guitar
- Marcus Miller – bass guitar on "King of Somewhere Hot"
- Anthony Jackson – bass guitar on "That's What Living Is to Me"
- Alex Blake – bass guitar on "Pre-You"
- Timothy B. Schmit – bass guitar on "L'Air de la Louisiane", background vocals on "Prince of Tides", "Great Heart", "L'Air de la Louisiane"
- Ralph MacDonald – percussion
- Robert Greenidge – steel drums
- Greg "Fingers" Taylor – harmonica
- The Memphis Horns – horns
- Wayne Jackson – trumpet, trombone
- Andrew Love – alto and tenor saxophone
- Grover Washington, Jr. – horns on "That's What Living Is to Me" and "Pre-You"
- The Neville Brothers – background vocals on "Bring Back the Magic", "Great Heart", "Homemade Music", "My Barracuda", "Smart Woman (In a Real Short Skirt)"
- James Taylor – background vocals on "Prince of Tides", "Pre-You", "Great Heart", "L'Air de la Louisiane"
- Rita Coolidge – background vocals on "Bring Back the Magic"

== Singles ==
- "Homemade Music" b/w "L'Air de la Louisiane" (Released on MCA 53360 in May 1988)
- "Bring Back The Magic" b/w "That's What Living Is To Me" (Released on MCA 53396 in August 1988)

== Tour ==
1988 brought yet another summer tour, this time to promote the Hot Water album, with all the usual stops.

=== 1988 Coral Reefer Band ===
- Jimmy Buffett: Vocals and guitar
- Tim Krekel: Guitar
- Tim Drummond: Bass
- Matt Betton: Drums
- Michael Utley: Keyboards
- Vince Melamed: Organ
- Greg “Fingers” Taylor: Harmonica and background Vocals
- Sam Clayton: Congas
- Robert Greenidge: Steel Drums
- Wayne Jackson: Horns
- Andrew Love: Horns
- Marshall Chapman: Vocals

=== Set list ===
Towards the beginning of the tour, the set list was a bit different than the majority of the tour with "Son of a Son of a Sailor" as the opener and "Margaritaville" as the set closer. For most of the tour, however, the Mac McAnally cover "It's My Job" opened the show and "Where's the Party" closed the set. "Fins" was the show closer pretty much every night, with the exception of Van Morrison's "Brown Eyed Girl" closing the Kings Dominion show on the fourth of July, its only known appearance of the tour.

Average set list:

1. "It's My Job" (Mac McAnally cover)
2. "Tequila" (The Champs cover)
3. "Stars on the Water" (Rodney Crowell cover)
4. "Come Monday"
5. "Knees of My Heart"
6. "Jolly Mon Sing"
7. Medley:
  1. "Son of a Son of a Sailor"
  2. "Boat Drinks"
  3. "Changes in Latitudes, Changes in Attitudes"
8. "Cheeseburger in Paradise"
9. "Some White People Can Dance" (with Greg "Fingers" Taylor on vocals)
10. "Homemade Music"
11. "Coconut Telegraph"
12. "My Barracuda"
13. "Bring Back the Magic"
14. "Coast of Marseilles" (Keith Sykes cover)
15. "God's Own Drunk" (Richard Buckley cover)
16. "Last Mango in Paris"
17. "Pencil Thin Mustache
18. "Why Don't We Get Drunk"
19. "Volcano"
20. "Where's the Party"
  Encore:
21. "A Pirate Looks at Forty"
22. "Margaritaville"
23. "Fins"
