= Buffett Live: Tuesdays, Thursdays, Saturdays =

Tuesdays, Thursdays, Saturdays

Live album by Jimmy Buffett
- Released: November 9, 1999
- Recorded: (see below)
- Genres: Country rock; Gulf and Western
- Label: Mailboat Records
- Producer: Michael Utley

Professional ratings
Review scores
Source	Rating
Allmusic	3/5 stars

Buffett Live – Tuesdays, Thursdays, Saturdays is a live album by American popular music singer-songwriter Jimmy Buffett. It was released on November 9, 1999. The album's material was culled from several concerts during the Don't Stop That Carnival Tour (1998) and Beach House on the Moon Tour (1999). It was the first live album by Buffett since Feeding Frenzy was released in October 1990 and Mailboat Records' debut release.

The title is derived from Buffett's long-time practice of touring at a more relaxed pace than other major artists, generally playing shows only on Tuesdays, Thursdays, and Saturdays.

== Chart performance ==
The album reached No. 37 on the Billboard 200 album chart, No. 33 on the Independent Chart, and No. 8 on the Internet Chart. It was certified gold in October 2000.

== Songs ==
The album features fan-favorites as well as new or obscure songs that never made it on a previous live release, such as "Fruitcakes", "Trying to Reason with Hurricane Season", "Brown Eyed Girl", "Tin Cup Chalice" and "Love and Luck".

While it is not part of the Big 8 and there has never been a studio release, "Southern Cross" makes its first official release. It was well received when Buffett started performing it during the Banana Wind Tour (1996) and became a concert staple.

The album also features "Pencil Thin Mustache" and "Son of a Son of a Sailor", songs that have not appeared on a live album for nearly fifteen years.

The remainder of the album features concert standards. Although played at every show, three of the Big 8 failed to make the cut: "A Pirate Looks at Forty", "Why Don't We Get Drunk", and "Changes in Latitudes, Changes in Attitudes" (the latter also left off of Buffett's previous live release, Feeding Frenzy).

The track listings show that "Margaritaville" includes the infamous "lost verse". During an East Hampton benefit concert, Buffett forgot that he had included the lost verse on his first live album, You Had to Be There, and apologized for making it appear that it was the lost verse's debut on this album.

The studio version of "Love and Luck" is available on Boats, Beaches, Bars and Ballads.

== Track listings ==
Buffett Live: Tuesdays, Thursdays, Saturdays track listing
No.	Title	Writer(s)	Length
1.	"Fruitcakes"	Jimmy Buffett, Amy Lee	6:56
2.	"Southern Cross"	Stephen Stills, Richard Curtis, & Michael Curtis	5:07
3.	"Pencil Thin Mustache"	Jimmy Buffett	3:15
4.	"Trying to Reason with Hurricane Season"	Jimmy Buffett	4:52
5.	"Coconut Telegraph"	Jimmy Buffett	3:12
6.	"Cheeseburger in Paradise"	Jimmy Buffett	3:06
7.	"Come Monday"	Jimmy Buffett	3:43
8.	"Son of a Son of a Sailor"	Jimmy Buffett	3:25
9.	"Volcano"	Jimmy Buffett, Keith Sykes, Harry Dailey	3:36
10.	"Brown Eyed Girl"	Van Morrison	5:40
11.	"Tin Cup Chalice"	Jimmy Buffett	3:24
12.	"Fins"	Jimmy Buffett, Barry Chance, Tom Corcoran, Deborah McColl	5:07
13.	"One Particular Harbour"	Jimmy Buffett, Bobby Holcomb	6:10
14.	"Margaritaville" (Lost Verse Included)	Jimmy Buffett	5:35
15.	"Love and Luck"	Jocelyne Beroard, Jimmy Buffett, Jean-Claude Naimro	7:34

The album is approximately 68 minutes long.

== Personnel ==
The Coral Reefer Band:

- Jimmy Buffett – guitar, vocals
- Michael Utley – keyboards
- Greg "Fingers" Taylor – harmonica
- Mac McAnally – guitars, vocals
- Robert Greenidge – steel drums, percussion
- Ralph MacDonald – percussion
- Peter Mayer – guitar, vocals
- Jim Mayer – bass, vocals
- Roger Guth – drums
- Amy Lee – saxophone
- John Lovell – trumpet
- T.C. Mitchell – saxophone
- Tina Gullickson – vocals
- Nadirah Shakoor – vocals
- David Hewitt, Ryan Hewitt – recording engineers

== Where each song was recorded live ==
BuffettWorld.com compiled a list of which songs were played at which show:

1. Fruitcakes – December 8, 1998, in Orlando, Florida
2. Southern Cross – September 2, 1999, in Mansfield, Massachusetts
3. Pencil Thin Mustache – December 8, 1998, in Orlando, Florida
4. Trying to Reason With Hurricane Season – December 4, 1998, in West Palm Beach, Florida
5. Coconut Telegraph – Thursday August 19, 1999, in Cincinnati, Ohio
6. Cheeseburger in Paradise – Tuesday August 31, 1999, in Hartford, Connecticut
7. Come Monday – March 4, 1999, in Orlando, Florida
8. Son of a Son of a Sailor – June 12, 1999, in Manassas, Virginia
9. Volcano – Thursday August 19, 1999, in Cincinnati, Ohio
10. Brown Eyed Girl – Thursday July 15, 1999, in Noblesville, Indiana
11. Tin Cup Chalice – December 4, 1998, in West Palm Beach, Florida
12. Fins – September 2, 1999, in Mansfield, Massachusetts
13. One Particular Harbour – December 4, 1998, in West Palm Beach, Florida
14. Margaritaville (Lost Verse Included) – September 2, 1999, in Mansfield, Massachusetts
15. Love and Luck – February 20, 1999, in Nashville, Tennessee
