= Jimmy Buffett sound board live albums =

Jimmy Buffett sound board live albums are a series of live albums by American singer-songwriter Jimmy Buffett recorded directly from the sound board without further editing thus resembling bootleg recordings. The albums were recorded at various concerts throughout the United States and represent typical Buffett live shows of their era with most of the albums recorded during Buffett's 2003 Tiki Time Tour. They have been released on compact disc on Buffett's own Mailboat Records distributed by RCA.

== Live in Auburn, WA ==
Live in Auburn, WA or Live in Auburn (Seattle), WA was recorded at White River Amphitheatre in Auburn, Washington on September 16, 2003. It was released in November 2003 on two compact discs on Mailboat 2100.

== Live in Las Vegas, NV ==
Live in Las Vegas, NV was recorded at MGM Grand Garden Arena in Las Vegas, Nevada on September 20, 2003. It was released in November 2003 on two compact discs on Mailboat 2102 and reached No. 13 on the Billboard Top Independent Albums chart.

=== Track listing ===
Disc One
| No. | Title | Length |
|---|---|---|
| 1. | "Great Heart" |
| 2. | "It's Midnight and I'm Not Famous Yet" |
| 3. | "Gypsies in the Palace" |
| 4. | "In the Shelter" |
| 5. | "Jolly Mon Sing" |
| 6. | "Son of a Son of a Sailor" |
| 7. | "Come Monday" |
| 8. | "Gravity Storm" |
| 9. | "Pencil Thin Mustache" |
| 10. | "Natives Are Restless" |
| 11. | "It's Five O'Clock Somewhere" |
| 12. | "One Particular Harbour" |
| 13. | "Cheeseburger in Paradise" |

Disc Two
| No. | Title | Length |
|---|---|---|
| 1. | "Tiki Bar is Open" |
| 2. | "Everybody's Talkin'" |
| 3. | "Why Don't We Get Drunk" |
| 4. | "This Hotel Room" |
| 5. | "The Wino and I Know" |
| 6. | "School Boy Heart" |
| 7. | "I Don't Know (Spicoli's Theme)" |
| 8. | "A Pirate Looks at Forty" |
| 9. | "Changes in Latitudes, Changes in Attitudes" |
| 10. | "Mexico" |
| 11. | "Margaritaville" |
| 12. | "Volcano" |
| 13. | "Fins" |
| 14. | "Southern Cross" |
| 15. | "Brown-Eyed Girl" |
| 16. | "Lovely Cruise" |

== Live in Cincinnati, OH ==
Live in Cincinnati, OH was recorded at Riverbend Music Center in Cincinnati, Ohio on August 26, 2003. It was released in January 2004 on two compact discs on Mailboat 2106.

=== Track listing ===
Disc One
| No. | Title | Length |
|---|---|---|
| 1. | "Great Heart" |
| 2. | "Gypsies in the Palace" |
| 3. | "Saxophones" |
| 4. | "In the Shelter" |
| 5. | "Honey Do" |
| 6. | "Son of a Son of a Sailor" |
| 7. | "Knees of My Heart" |
| 8. | "Burn That Bridge" |
| 9. | "Natives Are Restless" |
| 10. | "Come Monday" |
| 11. | "It's Five O'Clock Somewhere" |
| 12. | "One Particular Harbour" |
| 13. | "Cheeseburger in Paradise" |

Disc Two
| No. | Title | Length |
|---|---|---|
| 1. | "Tiki Bar Is Open" |
| 2. | "Everybody's Talkin'" |
| 3. | "Why Don't We Get Drunk" |
| 4. | "This Hotel Room" |
| 5. | "It's My Job" |
| 6. | "Tampico Trauma" |
| 7. | "A Pirate Looks at Forty" |
| 8. | "Changes in Latitudes, Changes in Attitudes" |
| 9. | "Boomerang" |
| 10. | "Mexico" |
| 11. | "Margaritaville" |
| 12. | "Volcano" |
| 13. | "Fins" |
| 14. | "Southern Cross" |
| 15. | "Growing Older, But Not Up" |

== Live in Mansfield, MA ==
Live in Mansfield, MA or Live in Mansfield (Boston), MA was recorded at Tweeter Center for the Performing Arts in Mansfield, Massachusetts on August 30, 2003. It was released in January 2004 on two compact discs on Mailboat 2107.

=== Track listing ===
Disc One
| No. | Title | Writer(s) | Length |
|---|---|---|---|
| 1. | "Great Heart" | Johnny Clegg |
| 2. | "Gravity Storms" | Jimmy Buffett, Jay Oliver |
| 3. | "Gypsies in the Palace" | Jimmy Buffett, Glenn Frey |
| 4. | "In The Shelter" | Jimmy Buffett |
| 5. | "Honey Do" | Jimmy Buffett, Michael Utley |
| 6. | "Son of a Son of a Sailor" | Jimmy Buffett |
| 7. | "Knees of my Heart" | Jimmy Buffett, Michael Utley, Will Jennings |
| 8. | "Coconut Telegraph" | Jimmy Buffett |
| 9. | "Natives Are Restless" | Don Tiki |
| 10. | "Come Monday" | Jimmy Buffett |
| 11. | "It's Five O'Clock Somewhere" | Jim "Moose" Brown, Don Rollins |
| 12. | "One Particular Harbour" | Jimmy Buffett, Bobby Holcomb |
| 13. | "Cheeseburger in Paradise" | Jimmy Buffett |

Disc Two
| No. | Title | Writer(s) | Length |
|---|---|---|---|
| 1. | "Tiki Bar Is Open" | John Hiatt |
| 2. | "Everybody's Talkin'" | Fred Neil |
| 3. | "Why Don't We Get Drunk" | Marvin Gardens |
| 4. | "Wino And I Know" | Jimmy Buffett |
| 5. | "It's My Job" | Mac McAnally |
| 6. | "School Boy Heart" | Jimmy Buffett, Matt Betton |
| 7. | "A Pirate Looks at Forty" | Jimmy Buffett |
| 8. | "Changes in Latitudes, Changes in Attitudes" | Jimmy Buffett |
| 9. | "Apocalypso" | Matt Betton |
| 10. | "Mexico" | James Taylor |
| 11. | "Margaritaville" | Jimmy Buffett |
| 12. | "Volcano" | Jimmy Buffett, Keith Sykes, Harry Dailey |
| 13. | "Fins" | Jimmy Buffett, Deborah McColl, Barry Chance, Tom Corcoran |
| 14. | "Sea Cruise" | Frankie Ford |
| 15. | "Lovely Cruise" | Johnathan Baham |

== Live in Hawaii ==
Live in Hawaii was recorded at the Waikiki Shell in Honolulu, Hawaii on January 28, 2004, and the Maui Arts & Cultural Center in Kahului, Hawaii on January 30, 2004. It was released in March 2005 on two compact discs on Mailboat 2109. Live in Hawaii includes a bonus DVD containing 16 minutes of footage from the two shows. The show was introduced by Don Ho and featured performances by Martin Denny and Henry Kapono.

=== Track listing ===
Disc 1
| No. | Title | Length |
|---|---|---|
| 1. | "Introduction by Don Ho / Great Heart" |
| 2. | "Coconut Telegraph" |
| 3. | "Gypsies in the Palace" |
| 4. | "In the Shelter" |
| 5. | "Burn that Bridge" |
| 6. | "Son of a Son of a Sailor" |
| 7. | "Come Monday" |
| 8. | "Natives Are Restless Tonight" |
| 9. | "Grapefruit-Juicy Fruit" |
| 10. | "It's Five O'Clock Somewhere" |
| 11. | "One Particular Harbour" |
| 12. | "Cheeseburger in Paradise" |
| 13. | "We Are the People Our Parents Warned Us About" |
| 14. | "Quiet Village" (with Martin Denny) |

Disc 2
| No. | Title | Length |
|---|---|---|
| 1. | "Tiki Bar Is Open" |
| 2. | "Everybody's Talkin'" |
| 3. | "Why Don't We Get Drunk (And Screw)" |
| 4. | "Jolly Mon" |
| 5. | "It's My Job" |
| 6. | "Boat Drinks" |
| 7. | "Far Side of the World" |
| 8. | "A Pirate Looks at Forty" |
| 9. | "Changes in Latitudes, Changes in Attitudes" |
| 10. | "Mexico" |
| 11. | "Margaritaville" |
| 12. | "Volcano" (with Henry Kapono) |
| 13. | "Fins" |
| 14. | "Back to the Island" (with Henry Kapono) |
| 15. | "Stories We Could Tell" |

== Live at Fenway Park ==
Live at Fenway Park was recorded at Fenway Park ballpark in Boston, Massachusetts on September 10 and 12, 2004. It was released in November 2005 on two compact discs on Mailboat 2115. Live at Fenway Park includes a DVD containing 55 minutes of footage from the two shows.

== Live in Anguilla ==
Live in Anguilla was recorded at reggae singer Bankie Banx's beach bar, the Dune Preserve, in Rendezvous Bay, Anguilla, British West Indies, and Banx appears on the cover of the album. It was released in November 2007 on two compact discs on Mailboat. Live in Anguilla includes an 82-minute DVD of concert footage.

=== Track listing ===
Disc 1
| No. | Title | Writer(s) | Length |
|---|---|---|---|
| 1. | "Changes in Latitudes, Changes in Attitudes" | Jimmy Buffett |
| 2. | "Domino College" | Jimmy Buffett, Dan Fogelberg |
| 3. | "Waiting in Vain" | Bob Marley |
| 4. | "When Salome Plays The Drum" | Jimmy Buffett |
| 5. | "Grapefruit-Juicy Fruit" | Jimmy Buffett |
| 6. | "Come Monday" | Jimmy Buffett |
| 7. | "They Don’t Dance Like Carmen No More" | Jimmy Buffett |
| 8. | "It's Five O'Clock Somewhere" | Jim "Moose" Brown, Don Rollins |
| 9. | "Cheeseburger in Paradise" | Jimmy Buffett |
| 10. | "King of Somewhere Hot" | Jimmy Buffett |
| 11. | "Treat Her Like a Lady" | Jimmy Buffett |
| 12. | "Still in Paradise" (with Bankie Banx) | Bankie Banx |
| 13. | "Weather with You" | Neil Finn, Tim Finn |
| 14. | "One Particular Harbour" | Jimmy Buffett, Bobby Holcomb |

Disc 2
| No. | Title | Writer(s) | Length |
|---|---|---|---|
| 1. | "Brown Eyed Girl" | Van Morrison |
| 2. | "Carnival World" | Jimmy Buffett, Roger Guth, Jay Oliver |
| 3. | "Autour du Rocher" | Jimmy Buffett, Henri Ledee, Leon Ledee, Marcel Limodin, Jean-Jacques Kraif |
| 4. | "Son of a Son of a Sailor" | Jimmy Buffett |
| 5. | "That's My Story and I'm Stickin' to It" | Jimmy Buffett, Jay Oliver |
| 6. | "In My Room" | Brian Wilson, Gary Usher |
| 7. | "A Pirate Looks at Forty / Redemption Song" | Jimmy Buffett / Bob Marley |
| 8. | "Volcano" | Jimmy Buffett |
| 9. | "Desperation Samba (Halloween in Tijuana)" | Jimmy Buffett, Will Jennings, Timothy B. Schmit |
| 10. | "Margaritaville" | Jimmy Buffett |
| 11. | "Southern Cross" | Stephen Stills, Richard Curtis, Michael Curtis |
| 12. | "Fins" | Jimmy Buffett, Deborah McColl, Barry Chance, Tom Corcoran |
| 13. | "Distantly in Love" | Jimmy Buffett |
| 14. | "Chanson Pour Les Petits Enfants" | Jimmy Buffett |
| 15. | "That’s What Living Is to Me" | Jimmy Buffett |
| 16. | "One Particular Harbour" | Jimmy Buffett, Bobby Holcomb |

DVD
| No. | Title | Length |
|---|---|---|
| 1. | "Chanson Pour Les Petits Enfants" |
| 2. | "That's What Living Is to Me" |
| 3. | "One Particular Harbour" |
| 4. | "Domino College" |
| 5. | "When Salome Plays the Drum" |
| 6. | "Cheeseburger in Paradise" |
| 7. | "Treat Her Like a Lady" |
| 8. | "Still in Paradise" with Bankie Ban" |
| 9. | "Changes in Latitudes, Changes in Attitudes" |
| 10. | "Autour du Rocher" |
| 11. | "It's Five O'Clock Somewhere" |
| 12. | "Son of a Son of a Sailor" |
| 13. | "Volcano" |
| 14. | "Desperation Samba (Halloween in Tijuana)" |
| 15. | "Margaritaville" |
| 16. | "A Pirate Looks at Forty / Redemption Song" |
| 17. | "Fins" |
| 18. | "Distantly in Love" |
