= Feeding Frenzy: Jimmy Buffett Live! =

Feeding Frenzy

Live album by Jimmy Buffett
- Released: October 1990
- Recorded: Lakewood Amphitheatre in Atlanta, Georgia (3, August 4, 1990), Riverbend Music Center in Cincinnati, Ohio (7, August 8, 1990)
- Genres: Country rock; Gulf and Western
- Length: 71:27
- Labels: MCA; 10022 (US, CD)
- Producers: Jimmy Buffett, Elliot Scheiner

Professional ratings
Review scores
Source	Rating
Allmusic	2/5 stars

Feeding Frenzy: Jimmy Buffett Live! is a live album by American popular music singer-songwriter Jimmy Buffett. It was initially released in October 1990 as MCA 10022. It is the second of Buffett's many live albums.

The album's material was culled from several concerts at Lakewood Amphitheatre in Atlanta, Georgia and Riverbend Music Center in Cincinnati, Ohio in August 1990 and was remixed by Elliot Scheiner at The Hit Factory Studios in New York City.

== Chart performance ==
Feeding Frenzy reached No. 68 on the Billboard 200 album chart.

== Songs ==
The album featured many of Buffett's concert favorites as well as two new songs that have not appeared on any other Buffett album: "In the City" penned by Coral Reefer Mac McAnally and Lord Burgess' calypso classic "Jamaica Farewell." "A Love Song (From a Different Point of View)" is the title given to "Why Don't We Get Drunk" and "Today's Message" is a spoken-word introduction to it. "Everlasting Moon" appears on the box set Boats, Beaches, Bars & Ballads.

Notably absent from the album, but played live, is "Changes in Latitudes, Changes in Attitudes," the only one of "The Big 8" missing. Although no set lists from the shows have circulated, other shows from the same tour conclude that much of the playlist order was changed.

(Basic set list structure from the tour):

1. "You'll Never Work in Dis Bidness Again"
2. "Stars on the Water"**
3. "Off to See the Lizard"**
4. "Come Monday"
5. "Last Mango in Paris"*
6. "Today's Message"
7. "Why Don't We Get Drunk (And Screw)"
8. "Grapefruit-Juicy Fruit"**
9. "If The Phone Doesn't Ring, It's Me"**
10. "The City"*
11. "One Particular Harbour"
12. Acoustic performance, changed from show to show
13. Acoustic performance, changed from show to show
14. "Everlasting Moon"/"Honey Do"
15. "Cheeseburger in Paradise"
16. "A Pirate Looks at Forty"
17. "Jolly Mon Sing"
18. "Gypsies in the Palace"
19. "Fins"
20. "Changes in Latitudes, Changes in Attitudes"**
21. "Margaritaville"
22. ("Pascagoula Run")**
  Encore:
23. "Jamaica Farewell"
24. "Volcano"

(*) = Appears on Feeding Frenzy, but out of order. (**) = Doesn't appear on Feeding Frenzy at all.

Songs 12 and 13 changed from show to show, such as: "Pencil Thin Mustache", "Havaña Daydreamin'", "Son of a Son of a Sailor", "Coast of Marseilles", "The Weather is Here, Wish You Were Beautiful", "Migration", "The Captain & the Kid", "Lone Palm", "Little Miss Magic", "Rocky Raccoon", "Tin Cup Chalice" and "He Went to Paris".

"Everlasting Moon" and "Honey Do" switched back and forth from show to show, while "Pascagoula Run" would either be played or dropped.

== Track listing ==
Feeding Frenzy: Jimmy Buffett Live! track listing
No.	Title	Writer(s)	Performed	Length
1.	"You'll Never Work in Dis Bidness Again"	Jimmy Buffett, Josh Leo, Matt Betton, Vince Melamed, Michael Utley, Willie Weeks	Aug 7, 1990, Cincinnati, OH	4:50
2.	"The City"	Mac McAnally	Aug 8, 1990, Cincinnati, OH	4:40
3.	"Last Mango in Paris"	Jimmy Buffett, Marshall Chapman, Will Jennings, Michael Utley	Aug 3, 1990, Atlanta, GA	3:38
4.	"Come Monday"	Jimmy Buffett	Aug 4, 1990, Atlanta, GA	3:52
5.	"Today's Message"	Jimmy Buffett	Aug 7, 1990, Cincinnati, OH	6:25
6.	"A Love Song (From a Different Point of View)"	Jimmy Buffett	Aug 7, 1990, Cincinnati, OH	3:27
7.	"One Particular Harbour"	Jimmy Buffett, Bobby Holcomb	Aug 7, 1990, Cincinnati, OH	6:24
8.	"Honey Do"	Jimmy Buffett, Michael Utley	Aug 3, 1990, Atlanta, GA	4:53
9.	"Cheeseburger in Paradise"	Jimmy Buffett	Aug 7, 1990, Cincinnati, OH	3:10
10.	"A Pirate Looks at Forty"	Jimmy Buffett	Aug 3, 1990, Atlanta, GA	4:25
11.	"Jolly Mon Sing"	Jimmy Buffett, Michael Utley, Will Jennings	Aug 7, 1990, Cincinnati, OH	4:58
12.	"Gypsies in the Palace"	Jimmy Buffett, Glenn Frey, Will Jennings	Aug 7, 1990, Cincinnati, OH	4:15
13.	"Fins"	Jimmy Buffett, Barry Chance, Tom Corcoran, Deborah McColl	Aug 7, 1990, Cincinnati, OH	4:35
14.	"Margaritaville"	Jimmy Buffett	Aug 3, 1990, Atlanta, GA	4:15
15.	"Jamaica Farewell"	Lord Burgess	Aug 7, 1990, Cincinnati, OH	3:30
16.	"Volcano"	Jimmy Buffett, Keith Sykes, Harry Dailey	Aug 8, 1990, Cincinnati, OH	4:10

== Personnel ==
The Coral Reefer Band:

- Jimmy Buffett – guitar, vocal
- Peter Mayer – guitar, vocals
- Jim Mayer – bass, vocals
- Roger Guth – drums
- Michael Utley – keyboards
- Jay Oliver – keyboards
- Robert Greenidge – steel drums, percussion
- Greg "Fingers" Taylor – harmonica
- Brie Howard – percussion, vocals
- Savannah Jane Buffett – percussion
- Ralph MacDonald – percussion
- Mary Harris – vocals
- Dena Iverson – vocals
- Katherine Maisnik – vocals
- Mac McAnally – guitars, vocals
- Zachary Richard – acadian accordion

=== Production ===
- Jimmy Buffett, Elliot Scheiner – producers
- Elliot Scheiner – Recording Engineer
- Mark Harder – Digital Editing
- Remote Recording Services Inc. With David Hewitt, Phil Gitomer, Bryan Leskowicz, and Pat Lynes
- Ted Jensen at Sterling Sound, NYC – mastering
