= License to Chill =

Studio album by Jimmy Buffett
- Released: July 13, 2004
- Recorded: 2003–04
- Genre: Country
- Length: 57:10
- Label: Mailboat; RCA Nashville
- Producer: Mac McAnally; Michael Utley

Jimmy Buffett chronology
Far Side of the World (2002)	License to Chill (2004)	Take the Weather with You (2006)

Singles from License to Chill
- 1. "Hey, Good Lookin'" Released: May 17, 2004; 2. "Trip Around the Sun" Released: August 30, 2004; 3. "Piece of Work" Released: January 2005

Professional ratings
Review scores
Source	Rating
Allmusic	4/5 stars
Rolling Stone	3.5/5 stars

License to Chill is the twenty-fifth studio album by American singer-songwriter Jimmy Buffett and was released on July 13, 2004, by Mailboat and RCA Nashville.

On this album, Buffett has many duets with noted contemporary country music artists, on country songs including "Hey, Good Lookin'" by Hank Williams. This rendition reached No. 8 on the Billboard country singles charts; another single, "Trip Around the Sun" (a duet with Martina McBride) reached No. 20. A third single, a solo version of "Piece of Work", was released in early 2005. The album features the most covers he's recorded for an album – 11 of the 16 songs are covers. It sold 238,600 copies in its first week of release according to Nielsen SoundScan and became his only album to reach No. 1 on the Billboard 200 album chart.

This is also the name of his 2004 concert tour, which included two shows at Boston's Fenway Park. In November 2005, Mailboat Records released Live at Fenway Park, a live recording of the two shows. Included was a 55-minute DVD of the show.

== Track listing ==
No.	Title	Writer(s)	Length
1.	"Hey, Good Lookin'" (featuring Clint Black, Kenny Chesney, Alan Jackson, Toby Keith, & George Strait)	Hank Williams	3:03
2.	"Boats to Build" (featuring Alan Jackson)	Guy Clark, Verlon Thompson	2:54
3.	"License to Chill" (featuring Kenny Chesney)	Jimmy Buffett, Mac McAnally, Al Anderson	3:56
4.	"Coast of Carolina"	Buffett, McAnally	3:41
5.	"Piece of Work" (featuring Toby Keith)	William A. Kimbrough	3:21
6.	"Anything, Anytime, Anywhere"	Bruce Cockburn	3:25
7.	"Trip Around the Sun" (featuring Martina McBride)	Anderson, Stephen Bruton, Sharon Vaughn	3:19
8.	"Simply Complicated"	Buffett, Bill Withers	2:15
9.	"Coastal Confessions"	Buffett	5:27
10.	"Sea of Heartbreak" (featuring George Strait)	Hal David, Paul Hampton	4:01
11.	"Conky Tonkin'" (featuring Clint Black)	Buffett, Bingo Gubelman	3:47
12.	"Playin' the Loser Again" (featuring Bill Withers)	Bill Withers	3:04
13.	"Window on the World"	John Hiatt	3:35
14.	"Someone I Used to Love" (featuring Nanci Griffith)	Bruce Cockburn	3:27
15.	"Scarlet Begonias"	Jerry Garcia, Robert Hunter	4:33
16.	"Back to the Island"	Leon Russell	3:22

== Personnel ==
The Coral Reefer Band

- Jimmy Buffett – guitar
- Robert Greenidge – steel drums, timbales
- Doyle Grisham – pedal steel guitar
- Roger Guth – drums
- Mac McAnally – guitar, mandolin, backing vocals
- Ralph MacDonald – percussion
- Michael Utley – keyboards

Additional musicians

- Al Anderson – guitar
- Tony Brown – keyboards
- Eric Darken – percussion
- Stuart Duncan – fiddle
- Will Kimbrough – guitar
- Sonny Landreth – guitar
- Bill Payne – keyboards
- Buster Somar – harmonica
- Glenn Worf – bass guitar

Backing Vocals

- Tim Bender
- Bekka Bramlett
- Wes Hightower
- J. L. Jamison
- Stan Kellam
- Charleston Miles
- Buddy Owen
- Jim Photoglo
- Mike Ramos
- Nadirah Shakoor
- Harry Stinson
- Chris Walsh
- Rachel Wilson

== Charts ==
=== Weekly charts ===
Chart (2004)	Peak position
US Billboard 200	1
US Top Country Albums (Billboard)	1

=== Year-end charts ===
Chart (2004)	Position
US Billboard 200	54
US Top Country Albums (Billboard)	8
Chart (2005)	Position
US Top Country Albums (Billboard)	30
