= Xfinity Center (Massachusetts) =

Outdoor theatre in Mansfield, Massachusetts, United States

- Great Woods
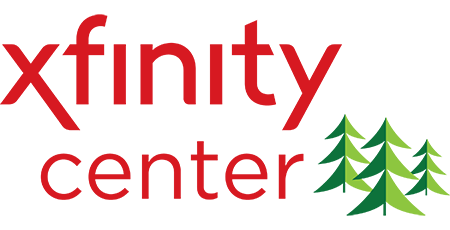

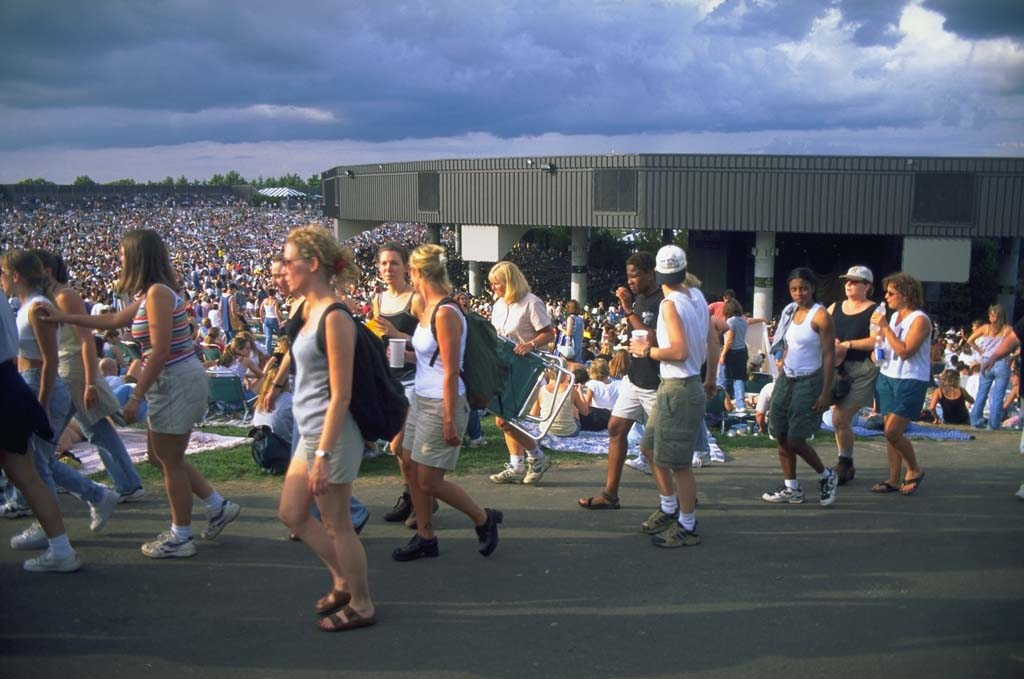
- Amphitheatre shown during Lilith Fair, circa 1998
- Interactive map of Xfinity Center
- Former names: Great Woods Center for the Performing Arts (1986–1999); Tweeter Center for the Performing Arts (1999–2008); Comcast Center (2008–2013)
- Address: 885 S. Main St. Mansfield, Massachusetts 02048-3148
- Coordinates: 41°59′33″N 71°13′12″W
- Owner: Live Nation New England
- Operator: Live Nation New England
- Capacity: 19,900

Construction
- Opened: June 13, 1986
- Renovated: 2002
- Expanded: 1994
- Cost: US$13 million ($38.9 million in 2025 dollars)

Website
- Xfinity Center

The Xfinity Center (originally the Great Woods Center for the Performing Arts and commonly Great Woods) is an outdoor amphitheatre located in Mansfield, Massachusetts. The venue opened during the summer of 1986 with a capacity of 12,000. It was expanded after 2000 to 19,900; 7,000 reserved seats, 7,000 lawn seats and 5,900 general admission seats. The season for the venue is typically from mid May until late September. In 2010, it was named Top Grossing Amphitheater by Billboard. It mainly hosts concerts; other events, such as graduation ceremonies, including that of Mansfield High School, occasionally take place.

== History ==
The venue was proposed by Don Law, John E. Drew and Sherman Wolf in 1985. Originally, the suggested site was in Brookline, Massachusetts. At that time, the venue was planned to be a performing arts center, consisting of concert hall, auditorium and black box theater. After conducting research, Law concluded the New England region was in desperate need of an outdoors venue (at the time, the main outdoor venues were Tanglewood, Cape Cod Melody Tent, and the South Shore Music Circus). The performing arts center plan was changed to an amphitheater. The site was moved to Mansfield to create a regional venue, being within 40 miles (64 km) of Providence, Boston, Worcester and Cape Cod.

The venue opened June 13, 1986, as the Great Woods Center for the Performing Arts; with a performance by Yo-Yo Ma and the Pittsburgh Symphony Orchestra. It was one of the busiest venues in New England, hosting nearly 80 concerts per season. Over the years, additional amphitheaters were added to the region. The Xfinity Theatre in Hartford and the Leader Bank Pavilion in Boston brought competition to the area, bringing the venue to an average of 36 events per season. The events run in the summer months, to accommodate for outdoor seating.

In 1998, the owner of venue, Don Law Company, was sold to SFX Entertainment and naming rights were sold to Tweeter Home Entertainment a year later, with the venue now becoming the "Tweeter Center for the Performing Arts". When the electronics retailer faced bankruptcy in 2007, multi-media organization Comcast bought naming rights, with the venue becoming the Comcast Center in 2008. The company renamed the venue "Xfinity Center" in 2014, to correspond with its current product branding.

== Naming history ==
- Great Woods Center for the Performing Arts (June 13, 1986—July 8, 1999)
- Tweeter Center for the Performing Arts (July 9, 1999—June 3, 2008)
- Comcast Center (June 4, 2008—December 31, 2013)
- Xfinity Center (January 1, 2014—present)

== Notable performances ==
- Aerosmith - has performed here 24 times; their live performance in the film Be Cool was filmed here.
- AJR - on May 20, 2022, for their tour supporting their album "OK Orchestra".
- Allman Brothers Band - the Live at Great Woods 1992 DVD was filmed here.
- Avenged Sevenfold - has played this venue three times, including their first American performance following the death of their drummer The Rev at the Mayhem Festival, with Mike Portnoy playing drums.
- Depeche Mode - has performed here five times; the last show, in 2009, was recorded for their live albums project Recording the Universe.
- Eagles - performed five consecutive nights on their Hell Freezes Over (1994) Tour, as part of their second live album.
- Flyleaf - Family Values (2006) DVD was filmed here.
- Gin Blossoms - Part of their video for "As Long as It Matters" was filmed here, during the WBCN River Rave, on June 8, 1996.
- James Taylor - during one tour, played four consecutive dates.
- Jimmy Buffett & The Coral Reefer Band - Portions of Buffett Live: Tuesdays, Thursdays, Saturdays (1999) and Encores (2008) were recorded here, as well as the Live in Mansfield, MA Soundboard album (2003). Buffett has performed at Great Woods 63 times, more than any other artist, and it is his most-played-at venue.
- Korn - the Family Values (2006) DVD was filmed here.
- Nickelback - Part of their music video "Rockstar" was filmed here.
- Oasis - Filmed two DVDs here, one in 2001, and one in 2005.
- Pearl Jam - have performed here 11 times; the July 11, 2003 show was the longest show the band had ever played, up-until that point.
- Phish - A track from A Live One (1994) was recorded here; on the same night, they also performed their complete Gamehendge saga. Phish performed at the venue 22 times between 1992 and 2024.
- R.E.M. - have performed at least 7 times, including a three night stand in 1989, and shows in 1995, 1999, 2003 and 2008.
- Rush - Two songs from their June 23, 1997 concert, including a full-length performance of "2112", are featured on the live album Different Stages.
- Santana - Regular performer with shows starting in 1986.
- Spice Girls - performed on July 8, 1998 as part of the North American leg of their Spiceworld Tour.
- Stone Sour - the Family Values (2006) DVD was filmed here.
- The Cure - Performed in 1986, 1989, 2000, 2004 and in 2023
- The Fray - portions of their music video "All At Once" were filmed here.
- The Smiths - thirteen songs from their August 5, 1986 concert are featured on the 2017 re-release of their LP The Queen is Dead.
- The Who - the DVD The Who: Live in Boston was filmed here, in September 2002.

== See also ==
- List of contemporary amphitheatres
- Live Nation
