= Jim Mayer (musician) =

American singer-songwriter

- Born: Tamil Nadu, India
- Genres: Gulf and Western, surf rock, country, soft rock
- Occupations: Musician, singer-songwriter, producer, entrepreneur, children's advocate
- Instruments: Guitar, bass, vocals
- Website: unclejimrocks.com

James Mayer is an American guitarist, singer, songwriter, producer, entrepreneur and children's advocate. He is best known as a longtime bassist for Jimmy Buffett's Coral Reefer Band, having played, toured and recorded with Buffett since 1989. Mayer is also a children's musician and performer. He has had two Number 1 hits on Sirius/XM Kids radio, is a regular guest on national children's radio shows, and has performed live shows and presented workshops for children and educators in the U.S. and Europe.

== Early life and education ==
Mayer was born in Tamil Nadu, India, where his parents, James and Selma "Sammy" Mayer, worked as Lutheran Church missionaries before returning to their hometown of St. Louis, Missouri, with their eight children.

He attended Lutheran High School South. In 1978 at age 17, he received a National Endowment for the Arts grant for jazz study. He received a Manhattan School of Music and New England Conservatory Scholarship in 1980. At 19, he was a faculty member of the Jamey Aebersold Jazz Clinics at Northern Illinois University, performing with international jazz artists Pat LaBarbera and Ed Thigpen. From 1981 to 1983, he attended the St. Louis Conservatory of Music.

== Career ==
Mayer began his musical career by performing with the Saint Louis Philharmonic and St. Louis Symphony Youth Orchestra. He remained in St. Louis to work with jazz musicians including Mose Allison, James Moody, Herb Ellis and Eddie Harris.

In 1985, Mayer formed the pop group P.M. with brother Peter Mayer and drummer Roger Guth. In 1987, they were signed to Warner Bros. Records and produced a Top-10 hit, "Piece of Paradise". In 1988, P.M. producer and engineer Elliot Scheiner introduced Jimmy Buffett to the band. In 1989, after recording "Off To See The Lizard" for Buffett, with Scheiner producing, Mayer and his P.M. bandmates joined Jimmy Buffett's Coral Reefer Band.

In 1994, he taught a course, "Music and the Senses", at Webster University on integrating music and movement.

In 1997, he studied bass with Sitar master Usted Imrat Khan. The same year, he toured Europe with jazz pianist Lynne Arriale.

In 1998, he moved to Nashville, Tennessee, to pursue off-tour work as a songwriter. He collaborated with Nashville writers and sat in with saxophonist Jeff Coffin of the Dave Mathews Band, and he began writing children's songs for his nieces and nephews and performing live children's shows. In 2003, he recorded his first children's album, "Funky as a Diaper", and the title song reached No. 1 on the charts.

From 2002 to 2004, he again performed and toured with the Peter Mayer Group.

Mayer has written, recorded and performed with Jimmy Buffett worldwide and has appeared on television shows, including The Tonight Show, The David Letterman Show, The Arsenio Hall Show, and Good Morning America. He performed at President Bill Clinton's 1992 inauguration as a member of the Coral Reefers. In 1998, after co-writing "I Don't Know And I Don't Care" with Buffett for the "Beach House on the Moon" album, Mayer was interviewed on National Public Radio by host Scott Simon.

=== Children's songs ===
Mayer developed two lines of children's products under the brands Uncle Jim and IM4U through the non-profit organization, The IM4U Campaign, which founded in 2008 with the mission of eradicating childhood bullying. In 2005, Buffett's label, Mailboat Records, signed Mayer to a children's record deal.

In 2013, he performed in Maine with country singer Shannon Selig to raise funds for anti-bullying programs. In March 2014, he took his anti-bullying message to three elementary schools in Georgia.

In 2011, Mac McAnally released a new album Live in Muscle Shoals on Mailboat Records, recorded in July 2010 at the W. C. Handy Music Festival in Muscle Shoals, Alabama. Appearing live with him were Mayer, the Coral Reefer Band and drummer Roger Guth.

In 2012, Mayer began collaborating with early education Professor Ellen Booth Church on anti-bullying lesson plans that use music to deliver the message.

== Awards ==
Mayer was named Best New XM Kids' Artist of the Year in 2004 and 2005.

in 2007, he received a Children's Music Web Award for Funky as a Diaper.

He was also given an iParenting Media "Hot Product" Award.

== Personal life ==
Mayer lives in Nashville, Tennessee and toured with Jimmy Buffett until the latter's death in 2023.

== Discography ==
=== Albums ===
- Still in One Peace (2010)
- Buffett Hotel (2009)
- Goodbye Hello (2009)
- Join The Band (2008)
- Live in Anguilla (2007)
- Let There Be Fun (2007)
- If The World Was You (2006)
- Take The Weather With You (2006)
- Live at Fenway Park (2005)
- Live in Hawaii (2005)
- Live in Cincinnati, OH (2004)
- Live in Mansfield, MA (2004)
- Music Box (2004)
- Live in Las Vegas, NV (2003)
- Live in Auburn, WA (2003)
- Funky as a Diaper (2002)
- Far Side of the World (2002)
- Progressive World (2002)
- Storytelling (2001)
- Stars And Promises (2001)
- Stirrin' Up The Water (2001)
- Tuesdays, Thursdays and Saturdays (1999)
- Christmas Island (1999)
- Off to See the Lizard (1989)

=== Singles ===
- "Beach House on the Moon" (1999)
- "Out of The Woods" (1999)
- "Spare Tire Orchestra" (1999)
- "Word of Mouth" (1998)
- "Born Out of Silence" (1998)
- "Romeo's Garage" (1998)
- "Banana Wind" (1996)
- "Barometer Soup" (1995)
- "Green Eyed Radio" (1995)
- "Red Wine & Lemonade" (1993)
- "Street of Dreams" (1991)
- "Feeding Frenzy" (1990)
- "Don't Stop The Carnival" (1998)
- "Fruitcakes" (1994)
- "Piece of Paradise" (1989)

=== Songwriting ===
- "I Don't Know And I Don't Care" (1998)
- Co-wrote the platinum album Banana Wind, which included "Overkill", "Jamaica Mistaica", "Desdamona", "Banana *WInd", "Cultural Infidel", and "Mental Floss" (1996)
- "Vampires, Mummies and the Holy Ghost" (1994)
- Co-wrote "Moonlight Over Paris" for Vanessa Williams's Sweetest Days album (1994)

=== Engineering and producing credits ===
- "Goodbye Hello" (2009)
- "World Famous Robot" (2009)
- "Music Box" (2004)
- "Stirrin' Up the Water" (2002)
- "Progressive World" (2002)
- "Storytelling" (2001)
- "Cowboy Ballet" (2001)
- "Storytelling" (2001)
- Stars & Promises Christmas Album (2000)
- "Spare Tire Orchestra" (1999)
- "Out of The Woods" (1999)
- "Born Out of Silence" (1998)
- "Green Eyed Radio" (1995)
- "Red Wine & Lemonade" (1993)
- "Street of Dreams" (1991)
