= Live in Hawaii =

Live in Hawaii may refer to:

- Live in Hawaii, a Jimmy Buffett sound board live album
- Live in Hawaii (Janet Jackson DVD)
