= Beach House on the Moon =

Studio album by Jimmy Buffett
- Released: May 24, 1999
- Genre: Country rock; Gulf and Western
- Length: 55:33
- Label: Margaritaville; Island
- Producer: Russell Kunkel; Michael Utley; Mac McAnally; Tony Brown

Jimmy Buffett chronology
Don't Stop the Carnival (1998)	Beach House on the Moon (1999)	Far Side of the World (2002)

Professional ratings
Review scores
Source	Rating
Allmusic	3/5 stars
Rolling Stone	link

Beach House on the Moon is the twenty-third studio album by American singer-songwriter Jimmy Buffett and was released on May 24, 1999. It is his second and last studio album released on Island Records and the last release of Margaritaville Records. It reached number 8 on the Billboard 200 chart.

== Songs ==
The song "Math Suks" caused a minor and brief media frenzy over Jimmy Buffett's seeming disdain for math education. The lyrics tell of the author's frustration as a math student. The song's lyrics refer to hearing the phrase "Math sucks" on an interview on TV, though Buffett later noted that the inspiration actually came from graffiti on a bridge in Key West Florida. Mathematical terms are used in a superficial way in the song, which drew criticism from mathematicians and mathematics teachers. The song was condemned by the US National Council of Teachers of Mathematics and the National Education Association for its alleged negative effect on children's education.

== Track listing ==
No.	Title	Writer(s)	Length
1.	"Beach House on the Moon"	Jimmy Buffett	6:06
2.	"Permanent Reminder of a Temporary Feeling"	Buffett	4:43
3.	"Waiting for the Next Explosion"	Buffett	5:00
4.	"Pacing the Cage"	Bruce Cockburn	4:43
5.	"You Call It Jogging"	John D. Loudermilk	3:52
6.	"Flesh and Bone"	Buffett, Mac McAnally, Michael Utley	5:42
7.	"I Will Play for Gumbo"	Buffett	4:06
8.	"Math Suks"	Buffett, Roger Guth, Peter Mayer	4:29
9.	"Spending Money"	Buffett, McAnally	2:55
10.	"Semi-True Story"	McAnally	3:14
11.	"Lucky Stars"	Roger Guth, Peter Mayer	3:46
12.	"I Don’t Know and I Don’t Care"	Buffett, Jim Mayer	3:43
13.	"Oysters and Pearls"	Buffett, McAnally	3:14
Total length:			55:33

== Personnel ==
=== The Coral Reefer Band ===
- Keyboards: Michael Utley
- Harmonica: Greg "Fingers" Taylor
- Steel drums: Robert Greenidge
- Percussion: Ralph MacDonald
- Drums: Roger Guth
- Guitar: Jimmy Buffett, Peter Mayer, Mac McAnally
- Bass guitar: Jim Mayer
- Saxophone: Amy Lee, Tom Mitchell
- Trumpet: John Lovell
- Vocals: Peter Mayer, Jim Mayer, Mac McAnally, Nadirah Shakoor, Tina Gullickson

=== Additional musicians ===
- Steel guitar: Doyle Grisham ("If you hear steel guitar it's Doyle.")
- Slide guitar: Jack Pearson (Tracks 3, 7, 5, and 10)
- Bass guitar: David Hood (Tracks 3, 6, 7, and 10)
- Drums: Roger Hawkins (Tracks 3, 6, 7, and 10)
- Flute: Bill Miller (Track 1)
- Fiddle: Stuart Duncan (Tracks 7 and 10)
- Tenor saxophone: Jim Horn (Track 6)
- Accordion: Marc Savoy (Track 7)
- Vocals: The Tams (Track 6)

== Charts ==
=== Weekly charts ===
Chart (1999)	Peak position
US Billboard 200	8

=== Year-end charts ===
Chart (1999)	Position
US Billboard 200	158

== Certifications ==
Region	Certification	Certified units/sales
United States (RIAA)	Gold	500,000^{^}
^{^} Shipments figures based on certification alone.
