= Associated Independent Recording =

British recording company

- Founded: 1965; 61 years ago in London, England
- Founders: George Martin; John Burgess
- Website: www.airstudios.com

Associated Independent Recording (AIR) is an independent recording company founded in London in 1965 by record producers George Martin, John Burgess, Ron Richards, and Peter Sullivan. In 1970 the company established its own professional audio recording facilities, AIR Studios.

== History ==
In 1965, producers George Martin, Ron Richards and John Burgess of Parlophone, together with Peter Sullivan of Decca, founded the company in order to produce music independently and license the final masters to the record companies, creating the opportunity for producers to earn bonuses and royalty payments. In 1970 AIR opened its first recording studio complex in London.

== AIR Studios ==
=== Oxford Street, London (1970–1991) ===
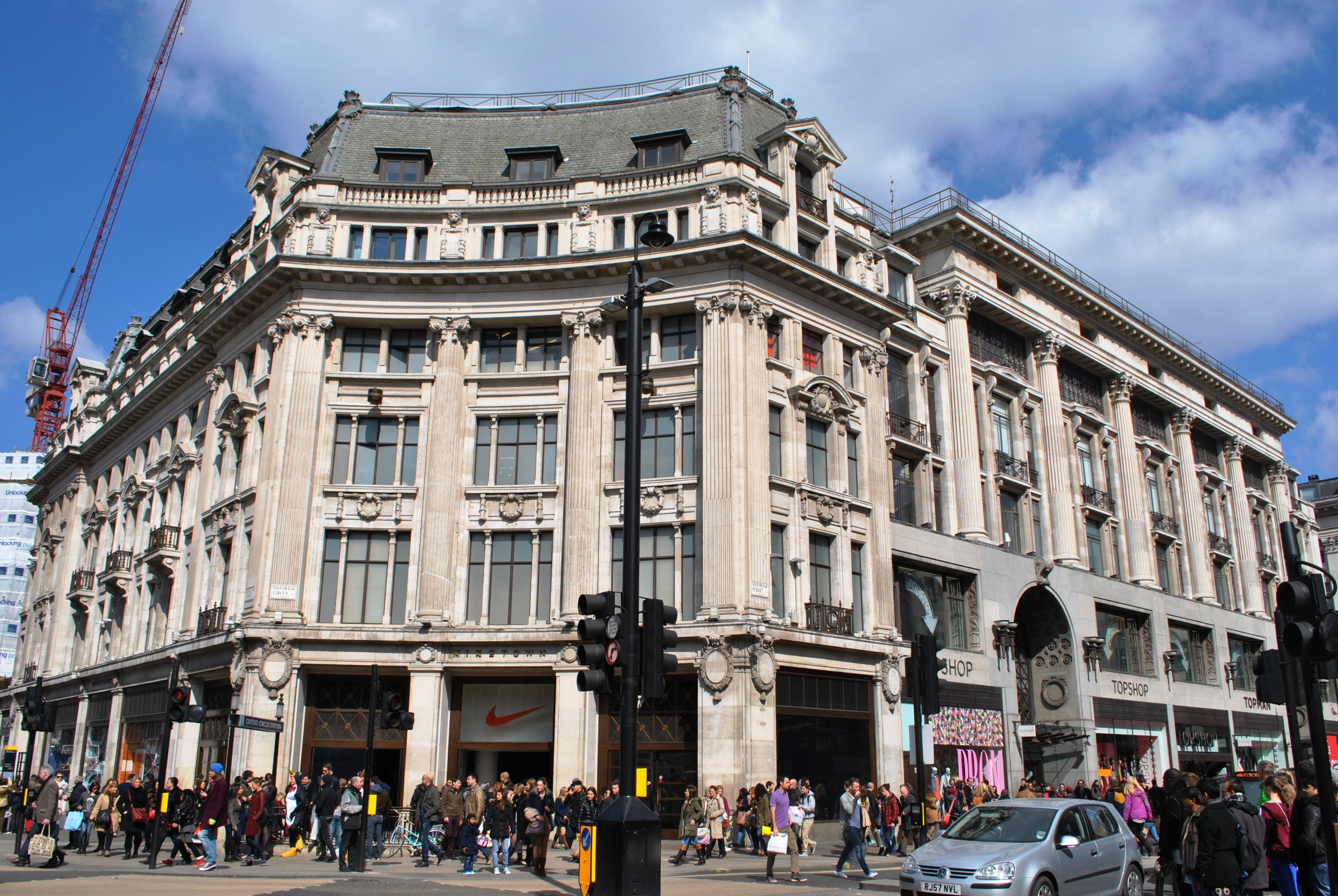
The Oxford Circus building whose 4th floor housed the original AIR Studios

AIR's first recording facility was meant to be suitable for both dubbing films and making records, so the company sought a central location with easy distance from the Claridge's and Connaught hotels to appeal to producers from around the world. Eventually a site in Oxford Circus on the fourth floor of 214 Oxford Street, atop the Peter Robinson department store was secured, and in 1969 the company began a year of construction costing £136,000. The studios were outfitted with £200,000 worth of equipment, opening with a high-profile launch party in October 1970.

The Oxford Circus facility included two large studios (one 58×32 feet, the other 30×28 feet) and two small ones. The studios contained two Bösendorfer pianos, many soundproof booths, and a 56-channel mixing console, custom-designed by Neve Electronics to AIR's specification.

AIR London became popular in the 1970s for spoken word recordings. It also became one of the most in-demand music studios in London by 1973.

=== AIR Lyndhurst Hall, Hampstead (1991–present) ===
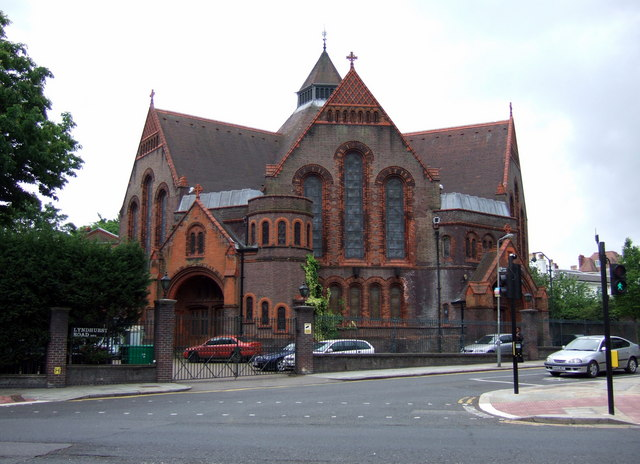
AIR Lyndhurst Hall in May 2007

In 1991, with the lease on the Oxford Street premises coming to an end, AIR Studios relocated to a building that was formerly the Lyndhurst Road Congregational Church, a Grade II listed building designed in 1880 by Victorian architect Alfred Waterhouse and located in the Hampstead suburb of north London. The space was revamped as a recording facility and opened for business in December 1992. The Lyndhurst Hall location features a hexagonal room large enough to record both a full orchestra and a chorus at the same time, making it a key London facility for film scores including the 2017 feature film Phantom Thread and classical recordings, as well popular music, television post-production, and dialogue, sound effects and music for video games. Spitfire Audio has recorded many of its digital audio samples here. Employees include Olga Fitzroy.

=== AIR Montserrat (1979–1989) ===
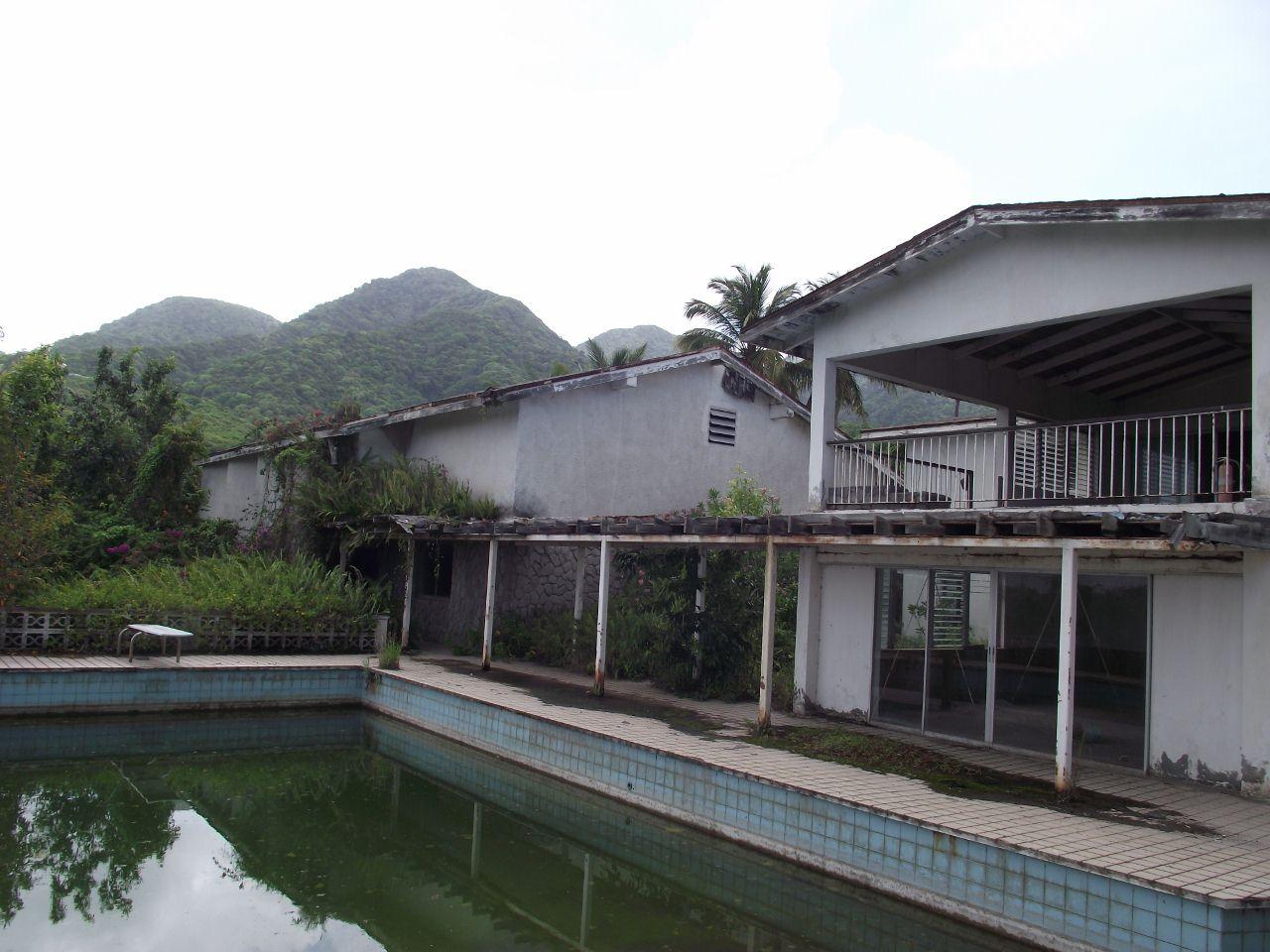
Ruins of the AIR Studio in Montserrat, May 2013

In 1975, AIR was sold to the Chrysalis Group, and Martin used the infusion of cash to build a residential studio on the island of Montserrat, a British colony in the Caribbean where the producer had a residence at Olveston House in Salem. The studio was built near Martin's home, situated on a hilltop overlooking the sea within a 26-acre farm and surrounded by mango, citrus, and coconut groves. After two years of construction, AIR Montserrat (16°44′28″N 62°12′53″W) opened in July 1979, complete with several surrounding villas where clients could stay while working at the studio. The first band to record there was the Climax Blues Band who were recording their album Real to Reel.

As of 1979, the studio consisted of a 46-channel Neve mixing console, a pair of MCI 24-track recorders, three Ampex ATR-102 2-track tape recorders and an MCI synchronizer (for any 46-track work), with JBL and Tannoy monitors.

Jimmy Buffett recorded Volcano at the Montserrat studio in May 1979, naming the album and its title song after the then dormant Soufrière Hills volcano on the island. Elton John recorded three albums at the Montserrat studio in the 1980s. Dire Straits recorded their hugely successful Brothers in Arms album at the studio between 1984 and 1985. Other well-known studio clients at AIR Montserrat included the Police (Ghost in the Machine and Synchronicity), Earth, Wind & Fire, Ultravox, Orchestral Manoeuvres in the Dark (pre-recorded Junk Culture), Paul McCartney, Gerry Rafferty, Lou Reed, Rush, the Rolling Stones, Black Sabbath, Midge Ure, Little River Band, Duran Duran, Sheena Easton and Luther Vandross.

By 1986, the studio equipment list read, in part:

Recently refurbished control room now featuring 60 channels by SSL with automation and TR and 12 fully integrated channels by Rupert Neve of Focusrite, two 32-track Mitsubishi X850 digital machines and 24-track Studer A800. Digital mixing on two Mitsubishi X86. Very comprehensive ancillary equipment list.

In 1989, shortly after the Rolling Stones had recorded their Steel Wheels album there, Hurricane Hugo devastated the island. While the Montserrat studio facility sustained only minor damage, it was never reopened, mainly due to changes in the recording industry. According to George Martin,

Before we came to Montserrat there was no western music to speak of on the island. Building AIR meant that many leading recording artists came to stay. It cast its spell on them as they mingled with the local people. It was, and still is, a unique place. ... But after ten great years of recording there the music business had changed fundamentally. The moguls running the business no longer wanted their artists miles away, outside their control. That happened to coincide with the immense devastation caused by the hurricane and sadly the studios had to close. The people of Montserrat are still very proud of the work that was done at AIR Studios.

The abandoned studio buildings are still standing as of 2025, but have been long neglected and have fallen into dereliction; their roofs are failing, leading to extensive damage to the floors of the accommodation area and the inner part of the studio complex, making them unsafe to walk on. The facility is now a modern ruin and is closed to the public. Olveston House operates as a guest house.

The 2021 Australian documentary film Under the Volcano interviews more than a dozen major artists and technicians who worked in the studio during the 1980s, and also includes archival narration and commentary by George Martin.

== See also ==
- Category:Albums recorded at AIR Studios
