= Far Side of the World =

Far Side of the World may refer to:

- Far Side of the World (album), an album by Jimmy Buffett
- The Far Side of the World, a 1984 historical novel in the Aubrey–Maturin series by Patrick O'Brian
- Master and Commander: The Far Side of the World, a 2003 film based upon the Aubrey-Maturin series of novels by Patrick O'Brian
