= Volcano (Jimmy Buffett album) =

Studio album by Jimmy Buffett
- Released: August 1, 1979 (LP); October 10, 1988 (CD)
- Recorded: May 1979
- Studio: AIR (Salem, Montserrat)
- Genre: Country rock; Gulf and Western
- Length: 33:37
- Label: MCA; MCA-5102 (US, 12", LP); MCAD-1657 (CD)
- Producer: Norbert Putnam

Jimmy Buffett chronology
Son of a Son of a Sailor (1978)	Volcano (1979)	Coconut Telegraph (1981)

Volcano is the ninth studio album by American popular music singer-songwriter Jimmy Buffett and is his 11th overall. It was released on August 1, 1979, as his first album for MCA after its absorption of ABC Dunhill.

The album and its title song are named for the then-dormant Soufrière Hills volcano on the island of Montserrat in the British West Indies where Buffett recorded the album in May 1979 at AIR Studios in Salem. The studio was severely damaged by Hurricane Hugo in 1989 and damaged even further after Soufrière Hills erupted again in 1995; it never reopened after Hurricane Hugo, however. Additional recording was done at Quadrafonic Studios in Nashville, Tennessee and Sunset Sound Studios in Los Angeles, California in the United States. The album is dedicated to Buffett's wife and his daughter, Savannah Jane Buffett, who was born just before its release.

== Songs ==
All of the songs are written or co-written by Buffett.

== Chart performance ==
Volcano reached number 14 on the Billboard 200 album chart and number 13 on the Billboard Top Country Albums chart. Three singles from the album charted including "Fins" (number 35 on the Billboard Hot 100; number 42 Adult Contemporary), "Volcano" (number 66 Hot 100; number 43 Adult Contemporary), and "Survive" (number 77 Hot 100).

In the United Kingdom, "Chanson pour les petits enfants" was released as a single for Christmas 1979. It did not chart officially, but peaked at number 86 in the Record Business magazine chart in Christmas week and became an enduringly popular song on BBC Radio 2 in a country where Buffett had very little success.

== Critical reception ==
Professional ratings
Review scores
Source	Rating
AllMusic	2/5 stars
Christgau's Record Guide	B−
The Rolling Stone Album Guide	2/5 stars

Although the album generated three songs, "Fins", "Volcano", and "Boat Drinks", that were popular in concert and performed frequently, critical reception was less positive. AllMusic reviewer Vik Iyengar posits that "this album marks a low point for Jimmy Buffett in a decade in which he delivered one solid album after another."

Record World called the single "Survive" a "powerful ballad about long-distance love."

== Track listing ==
Side 1
No.	Title	Writer(s)	Length
1.	"Fins"	Jimmy Buffett, Deborah McColl, Barry Chance, Tom Corcoran	3:27
2.	"Volcano"	Jimmy Buffett, Keith Sykes, Harry Dailey	3:37
3.	"Treat Her Like a Lady"	Jimmy Buffett, David Loggins	4:18
4.	"Stranded on a Sandbar"	Jimmy Buffett	3:08
5.	"Chanson Pour Les Petits Enfants"	Jimmy Buffett	4:01

Side 2
No.	Title	Writer(s)	Length
6.	"Survive"	Jimmy Buffett, Mike Utley	4:50
7.	"Lady I Can't Explain"	Jimmy Buffett	2:42
8.	"Boat Drinks"	Jimmy Buffett	2:37
9.	"Dreamsicle"	Jimmy Buffett	2:18
10.	"Sending the Old Man Home"	Jimmy Buffett	3:23

Cassette pressings of the album have "Volcano" and "Dreamsicle" swapped in track order.

The running times listed for "Treat Her Like a Lady" and "Survive" on LP and CD pressings are incorrect. They are listed at 3:55 and 4:29, respectively.

== Personnel ==
The Coral Reefer Band:

- Jimmy Buffett – vocals, acoustic guitar
- Keith Sykes – background vocals, guitar
- Barry Chance – lead guitar
- Andy McMahon – Fender Rhodes electric piano, background vocals on "Stranded"
- Mike Utley – piano, organ, clavinet
- Harry Dailey – bass, background vocals on "Stranded", "Chanson" and "Dreamsicle"
- Russ Kunkel – drums, percussion, congas on "Volcano"
- Greg "Fingers" Taylor – harmonica, organ on "Boat Drinks", shakers on "Volcano"
- Johnny Montezuma – "anything and everything" on "Fins"
- Jackie Dangler – pans on "Fins" and "Boat Drinks"
- Steve Forman – percussion on "Fins" and shakers on "Chanson Pour les Petits Enfants"
- Donald Douglas – banjo-uke on "Volcano"
- Wilfred Tuitt – guitar on "Volcano"
- James Elmer – bass pipe on "Volcano"
- Billy Puett & Bill Jones – recorders on "Chanson Pour les Petits Enfants"
- Farrell Morris – tambourine on "Chanson Pour les Petits Enfants"
- James Taylor – background vocals, guitar on "Sending the Old Man Home"
- Norbert Putnam – bass on "Sending the Old Man Home"
- Deborah McColl, Alex Taylor, Hugh Taylor, Dave Loggins, Venetta Fields, Brenda Bryant, Paulette Brown, Juan Cadiz – background vocals

== Singles ==
- "Fins" b/w "Dreamsicle" (Released on MCA 41109 in July 1979)
- "Dreamsicle" b/w "Dreamsicle" (Released on MCA 41109 in July 1979)
- "Volcano" b/w "Stranded On A Sandbar" (Released on MCA 41161 in November 1979)
- "Survive" b/w "Boat Drinks" (Released on MCA 41199 in February 1980)

== Tour ==
Buffett set out on a You Had to Be There Tour from February through April 1979, stopping in May to record Volcano. The remainder of the year Buffett toured in support of the album. One of these concerts was Buffett's first trip to Hawaii, opening for the Eagles in Aloha Stadium in September.
