= Son of a Son of a Sailor =

Studio album by Jimmy Buffett
- Released: March 17, 1978 (LP); August 22, 1987 (CD)
- Recorded: 1977
- Studios: Bay Shore Recording Studios, Inc. Coconut Grove, Florida, Quadrafonic Sound, Nashville, Tennessee
- Genres: Country rock; gulf and Western
- Length: 34:09
- Labels: ABC Dunhill; AA-1046 (US, 12")
- Producer: Norbert Putnam

Jimmy Buffett chronology
Changes in Latitudes, Changes in Attitudes (1977)	Son of a Son of a Sailor (1978)	Volcano (1979)

Singles from Son of a Son of a Sailor
- 1. "Cheeseburger in Paradise"; 2. "Livingston Saturday Night"; 3. "Mañana"

Son of a Son of a Sailor is the eighth studio album by American singer-songwriter Jimmy Buffett. It was initially released in March 1978 as ABC Dunhill AA-1046 and later re-released on its successor label, MCA.

== Chart performance ==
Son of a Son of a Sailor reached #10 on the Billboard 200 album chart and #6 on the Billboard Top Country Albums chart. The album was also certified Platinum by the RIAA.

Three singles from the album charted including "Cheeseburger in Paradise" (#32 on the Billboard Hot 100), "Livingston Saturday Night" (#52 Hot 100; #91 on the Billboard Hot Country Singles chart), and "Mañana" (#84 Country).

== Songs ==
Two of the songs on Son of a Son of a Sailor are written by Keith Sykes and the remainder are written by Buffett. "Cheeseburger in Paradise" from the album appears on all of Buffett's major greatest hits collections and is a perennial concert favorite, one of "The Big 8" songs that he has played at almost every concert and which is the namesake of the Cheeseburger in Paradise restaurant chain. Buffett had recorded a significantly different version of "Livingston Saturday Night" for the 1975 Rancho Deluxe soundtrack. The Son of a Son of a Sailor version of the song also appeared on the soundtrack to the 1978 movie FM that featured a cameo appearance by Buffett.

== Critical reception ==
Professional ratings
Review scores
Source	Rating
AllMusic	3/5 stars
Rolling Stone	(mixed)
The Village Voice	B

Record World said that "Livingston Saturday Night" is "a piece of his usual down home rock beat and good-time lyrics." Record World said that "Mañana" shows Buffett's "sly way with a lyric" and that "Like 'Margaritaville', the mood is easy with a touch of Latin." The New York Times noted that "it may not be desperately important music, but it's very, very pleasant."

== Track listing ==
All tracks are written by Jimmy Buffett, except where noted.

Side one
No.	Title	Writer(s)	Length
1.	"Son of a Son of a Sailor"		3:23
2.	"Fool Button"		2:47
3.	"The Last Line"	Keith Sykes	3:38
4.	"Livingston Saturday Night"		3:09
5.	"Cheeseburger in Paradise"		2:51

Side two
No.	Title	Writer(s)	Length
6.	"Coast of Marseilles"	Keith Sykes	5:02
7.	"Cowboy in the Jungle"		5:06
8.	"Mañana"		4:13
9.	"African Friend"		4:00

== Personnel ==
The Coral Reefer Band:

- Jimmy Buffett – vocals, acoustic guitar
- Steve Goodman – guitar
- Tim Krekel – guitar
- Harry Dailey – bass
- Mike Utley – keyboards
- Kenneth Buttrey – drums, percussion
- Greg "Fingers" Taylor – harmonica
- Norbert Putnam – bass, kalimba, producer
- Jay Spell – keyboards
- Harvey Thompson – saxophone
- Farrell Morris – percussion
- Billy Puett – recorder, bass flute
- The Sid Sharp Strings – strings
- Deborah McColl, Ginger Holladay, Janie Fricke, Larry Lee, Lea Jane Berinati, Penny Nichols – background vocals

== Charts ==
=== Weekly charts ===
Chart (1978)	Peak position
US Billboard 200	10
US Top Country Albums (Billboard)	6

=== Year-end charts ===
Chart (1978)	Position
US Billboard 200	63
US Top Country Albums (Billboard)	26

== Tour ==
1978 saw Buffett begin his own tour with the Coral Reefer Band to support the album, called the Cheeseburger in Paradise Tour, spending March and April playing along the east coast and then the mid-west. June brought California dates which included a few shows opening for Jackson Browne in San Jose and Angels Camp, California. August brought a Florida stadium tour with the Little River Band and the Steve Miller Band along with three shows in Atlanta and Miami which were recorded for the live album You Had To Be There.

=== 1978 Coral Reefer Band ===
- Jimmy Buffett: Vocals and guitar
- Barry Chance: Guitar
- Harry Dailey: Bass and background Vocals
- Deborah McColl: Background vocals
- Greg "Fingers" Taylor – Harmonica and background Vocals
- Jay Spell – Piano
- Michael Utley – Organ
- Kenneth Buttrey – Drums

=== Performance ===
The set list changed nightly, mainly with an acoustic set between "Margaritaville" and "Why Don't We Get Drunk"—however, You Had to Be There chronicles some unusual inclusions, such as: "Miss You So Badly" replaces "Mañana"; a new song "Perrier Blues" emerges later in the tour; a rare performance of "The Captain and the Kid" appeared during the acoustic set; and "Cheeseburger in Paradise" was missing. The shows opened with "Son of a Son of a Sailor" and closed with "Tampico Trauma" every night; and the encore typically consisted of "Morris' Nightmare", "Dixie Diner" (Larry Raspberry and the Highsteppers cover) and "Last Line" (Keith Sykes cover) respectively, with "Morris' Nightmare" closing the show only when it debuted in Boston.

==== Setlist ====
An average set list:

1. "Son of a Son of a Sailor"
2. "Pencil Thin Mustache"
3. "Wonder Why We Ever Go Home"
4. "Landfall"
5. "Mañana"
6. "Livingston Saturday Night"
7. "Margaritaville"
8. "Grapefruit—Juicy Fruit" (acoustic)
9. "Banana Republics" (Steve Goodman cover) (acoustic)
10. "He Went to Paris" (acoustic)
11. "God's Own Drunk" (Richard Buckley cover) (acoustic)
12. "Why Don't We Get Drunk" (mostly performed with the Coral Reefer Band, but occasionally performed acoustically)
13. "Coast of Marseilles" (Keith Sykes cover)
14. "Cheeseburger in Paradise"
15. "Changes in Latitudes, Changes in Attitudes"
16. "A Pirate Looks at Forty"
17. "Come Monday"
18. "Tampico Trauma"
  Encore:
19. "Morris' Nightmare"
20. "Dixie Diner" (Larry Raspberry And The Highsteppers cover)
  Encore 2:
21. "The Last Line" (Keith Skyes cover)
