= Scarlet Begonias =

Song by the Grateful Dead

from the album From the Mars Hotel
- Released: June 27, 1974
- Recorded: 1974
- Genre: Rock, funk rock, psychedelic rock, reggae fusion
- Length: 4:20
- Label: Grateful Dead Records
- Composer: Jerry Garcia
- Lyricist: Robert Hunter
- Producer: Grateful Dead

"Scarlet Begonias" is a song by the Grateful Dead. The lyrics were written by Robert Hunter and the music by Jerry Garcia. The recording first appeared on the 1974 album From the Mars Hotel.

The group first performed the song live on March 23, 1974, at the Cow Palace in Daly City, California. When "Fire on the Mountain" was incorporated into the band's repertoire in 1977, "Scarlet Begonias" would often be paired with it, resulting in what would be nicknamed "Scarlet > Fire" with the first iteration of this pairing on March 18, 1977.

In August 2026, Rolling Stone ranked "Scarlet Begonias" as the best Grateful Dead song of all time.

== References and Legacy ==
The song begins in Grosvenor Square in London and also references "Tea for Two" from No, No, Nanette by Irving Caesar and Vincent Youmans.

The third stanza uses gambling/loss imagery that occurs in many Grateful Dead songs. The line "As I picked up my matches and was closing the door" uses the symbolism of playing poker with matchsticks to indicate a very low stakes gamble that was made for fun.

The line "Everybody's playing in the Heart of Gold Band" was used by Keith and Donna Godchaux to name their new group Heart of Gold Band when they left Grateful Dead in 1979.

== Covers ==
- A version of the song appears on the Sublime album 40oz. to Freedom (1992), which samples James Brown's "Funky Drummer" prominently and features a rapped interlude written by Bradley Nowell which takes the story in a darker direction with the woman being a police informant.
- Jimmy Buffett released a studio version of the song on his album License to Chill in 2004, and a live version on 2004 live album Live at Fenway Park.
- A bluegrass version of the song appeared on the 2008 album Rex (Live at the Fillmore) by Keller Williams with Keith Moseley and Jeff Austin. Keller performs the song frequently as part of his solo concerts.
- After the Grateful Dead disbanded in 1995, it was performed in concert by Dead spin-off bands Phil Lesh & Friends, Bob Weir & RatDog, Dead & Company, Rhythm Devils, BK3, Mickey Hart Band and Donna Jean Godchaux Band, as well as the Dead, and Furthur.
- Phish played "Scarlet > Fire" at their very first show at Harris-Millis Hall at the University of Vermont on December 2, 1983.
- Thievery Corporation played a version in Chicago, IL, on July 2, 2015, as part of 'The Music Never Stopped' series, with Loulou Ghelichkhani on vocals.
- Bikini Trill released a version of the song on their debut EP 'Wassup, We Good?' in 2018.
- Jazz Is Dead included a jazz interpretation of the song in their 1998 album, Blue Light Rain.
