= White River Amphitheatre =

Concert venue in Auburn, Washington, US

- Interactive map of White River Amphitheatre
- Address: 40601 Auburn Enumclaw Rd; Auburn, WA 98092-9321
- Location: Muckleshoot Indian Reservation
- Coordinates: 47°14′15″N 122°06′43″W
- Owner: Muckleshoot Tribal Enterprises
- Operator: Live Nation
- Capacity: 16,000
- Type: Amphitheatre

Construction
- Opened: June 14, 2003

Website
- Venue Website

White River Amphitheatre is a Live Nation–managed concert venue, located 8 miles (13 km) east of Auburn, Washington, and 7 miles (11 km) west of Enumclaw, Washington, on the Muckleshoot Indian Reservation. It is 22 miles (35 km) northeast of Tacoma and 36 miles (58 km) southeast of Seattle. The capacity is 16,000, with 9,000 covered seats. Completed in 2003, the 98-acre (40 ha) project cost more than $30 million and hosts musical events under an acoustically treated metal roof; it features two 30-by-40-foot (9x12 m) video screens on either side of the stage.

== History ==
White River Amphitheater opened on June 14, 2003. Hometown stars Heart were the opening act. Although ground had been broken eight years earlier, the project was delayed due to the environmental impact statement and traffic concerns.

The Army Corps of Engineers signed off on construction in September 2002. In February 2003, the Washington State Department of Transportation "issued a permit allowing access from crowded, two-lane state Route 164."

When it opened, the venue was operated by the Muckleshoot Indian Tribe, Clear Channel Entertainment and Bill Graham Presents. Today it is operated by Live Nation; they reduced capacity from 20,000 to 16,000 in 2015. To mitigate traffic, the venue used to offer shuttles to and from the Auburn Super Mall, which was renamed The Outlet Collection Seattle for some concerts. As of 2025 shuttles are no longer offered for any concert according to the FAQ.

== Notable concerts ==
Jimmy Buffett released a CD of his September 16, 2003, performance, called Live in Auburn, WA.

Heavy metal band Iron Maiden has also performed here on their last few tours including Eddie Rips Up The World Tour, The Somewhere Back In Time World Tour, and The Final Frontier World Tour. During the show on June 22, 2010, Frontman Bruce Dickinson stated that the pit was the only one at 100% capacity on the tour so far. Iron Maiden performed here during their Maiden England World Tour on July 30, 2012.

Sting performed during his “Symphonicities” Tour on June 6, 2010, along with the Royal Philharmonic Orchestra. Rancid performed on September 2, 2011.

AJR performed at the amphitheatre on June 14, 2022, on their tour supporting their album "OK Orchestra".

The amphitheatre has played host to music festivals, including Crüe Fest and Crüe Fest 2, Farm Aid, The Gigantour, The Mayhem Festival, Projekt Revolution, Ozzfest, and The Uproar Festival. Since 2010, the KISW “Pain in the Grass” festival has been held here. The venue hosted the Vans Warped Tour for five years straight, from 2012 and through 2016.

== See also ==
- List of contemporary amphitheatres
