= Boat Drinks =

Song by Jimmy Buffett

from the album Volcano
- Written: February 1979
- Released: August 1979
- Recorded: May 1979
- Genre: Country rock; Gulf and Western
- Length: 2:37
- Label: MCA
- Songwriter(s): Jimmy Buffett
- Producer(s): Norbert Putnam

"Boat Drinks" is a song written and performed by American singer-songwriter Jimmy Buffett. It was released as a B-side (b/w "Survive") on MCA in 1979. Despite not being a single, it is one of his most popular songs, frequently played in concert and occasionally on the radio, and has been included on many compilation albums including Songs You Know by Heart. Despite its popularity, the song was notably absent from Meet Me in Margaritaville: The Ultimate Collection.

A commercial for Play FLA USA scratch-off game was noted to sound like an instrumental version of "Boat Drinks", which Buffett had not given permission for any musical licensing to the Florida Lottery. Communications specialist Kathy Wilson and a Buffett spokeswoman both later confirmed that the two songs may have sounded similar due to their "fun-in-the-sun-type" styles, but they were technically greatly different from one another.

== History ==
The song was written in February 1979, while Jimmy was homesick in Boston. In the 1992 box set Boats, Beaches, Bars & Ballads, Buffett writes:

It was February in Boston, and I was cold and wanted to go home. Rum and tonic was the antifreeze, and the newspaper was full of ads for warmer climates. I was in a place owned by Derek Sanderson, who was a very famous player for the Boston Bruins in the '70s. I came out of the bar and couldn't find a cab except for the one that was running in front of the nearby hotel. There was no driver in it, and I was too cold to care about the consequences. There is an old Navy expression which says, 'Beg forgiveness, not permission.' I hopped in and drove back to my hotel. I did leave the fare on the seat.

== Live Appearances ==
The song appeared on Live at Fenway Park, where Buffett said: "I'm not going to come to Boston and not play this song." This is his only song written in Boston. While the song has been played in concert ever since it was written in 1979, it did not appear on a live release until 2005's Live in Hawaii.
