= Far Side of the World (album) =

Studio album by Jimmy Buffett
- Released: March 19, 2002
- Recorded: 2001
- Genre: Country rock; Gulf and Western
- Length: 57:41
- Label: Mailboat
- Producer: Russ Titelman

Jimmy Buffett chronology
Beach House on the Moon (1999)	Far Side of the World (2002)	License to Chill (2004)

Professional ratings
Review scores
Source	Rating
AllMusic	3/5 stars

Far Side of the World is the twenty-fourth studio album by American singer-songwriter Jimmy Buffett and was released on March 19, 2002. It was Buffett's first album since forming his own record label Mailboat Records in 1999.

== Reception ==
Spin magazine described Far Side as "mellow and reflective" without being "too sleepy or pretentious". Although popular among Buffett's fans, the music style was criticized as not being popular for a wide range of audiences.

== Track listing ==
Far Side of the World track listing
No.	Title	Writer(s)	Length
1.	"Blue Guitar"	Roger Guth, Peter Mayer	4:28
2.	"Mademoiselle (Voulez-Vous Danser)"	Lennie Gallant	4:07
3.	"Autour Du Rocher"	Jimmy Buffett, Henri & Leon Ledee, Marcel Limodin, Jean-Jacques Kraif	8:05
4.	"Savannah Fare You Well"	Hugh Prestwood	4:28
5.	"All the Ways I Want You"	Bruce Cockburn	4:17
6.	"Last Man Standing"	Mac McAnally, Jimmy Buffett	3:45
7.	"What if the Hokey-Pokey Is All It Really Is About?"	Jimmy Buffett, Mac McAnally, C. Macak, T. Baker, L. Laprise	4:24
8.	"Altered Boy"	Jimmy Buffett, Wayne Jobson	7:18
9.	"USS Zydecoldsmobile"	Sonny Landreth	4:55
10.	"Someday I Will"	Jimmy Buffett, Matt Betton	3:13
11.	"Far Side of the World"	Jimmy Buffett	5:48
12.	"Tonight I Just Need My Guitar"	Jimmy Buffett, Mac McAnally	2:52
Total length:			57:41

== Charts ==
Chart performance for Far Side of the World
Chart (2002)	Peak position
US Billboard 200	5
US Independent Albums (Billboard)	1
