= Ampex ATR-100 =

Multitrack tape recorder

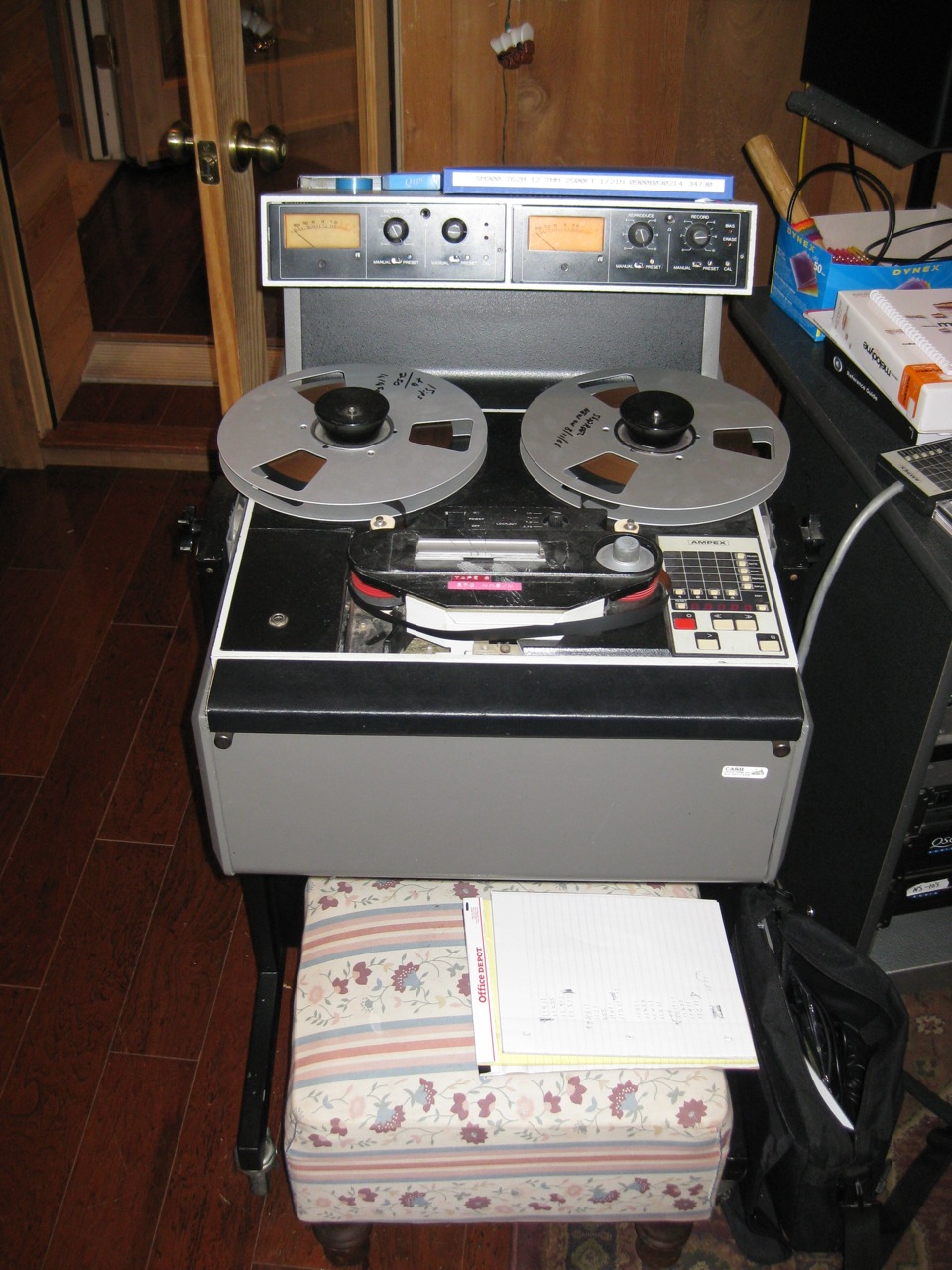
Ampex ATR-100

The Ampex ATR-100 is a multitrack tape recorder, designed by Ampex Corporation, of Redwood City, California, United States. It was introduced at the Spring 1976 AES Conference in Los Angeles, and was geared towards the ultra high end studio market. The original versions were designed specifically as a stereo or quadraphonic (2 or 4 track) mixdown and mastering deck. It has gained a reputation in the recording industry as the most accurate analogue tape recorder ever to be produced.

The ATR-100 was designed by a three-person design team consisting of Robert P. Harshberger Jr. (motors and control system), Alastair M. Heaslett (signal electronics) and Roger Sleger (mechanical systems).

== Features and design ==
Key features of the design are the machine's interchangeable headblock system, which allows the ATR-100 to be converted to run either quarter-inch or half-inch magnetic tape. Ampex was the first company to implement a servo-controlled, direct-drive-capstan tape transport, which allows the tape speed and tension to be continuously monitored by a servo relay. The transport consequently has excellent wow and flutter specifications. The ATR-100 also features dual VU meters, or four VU meters in the case of the four track models, and a digital tape timer. An optional remote control is also available.

== Upgrade ==
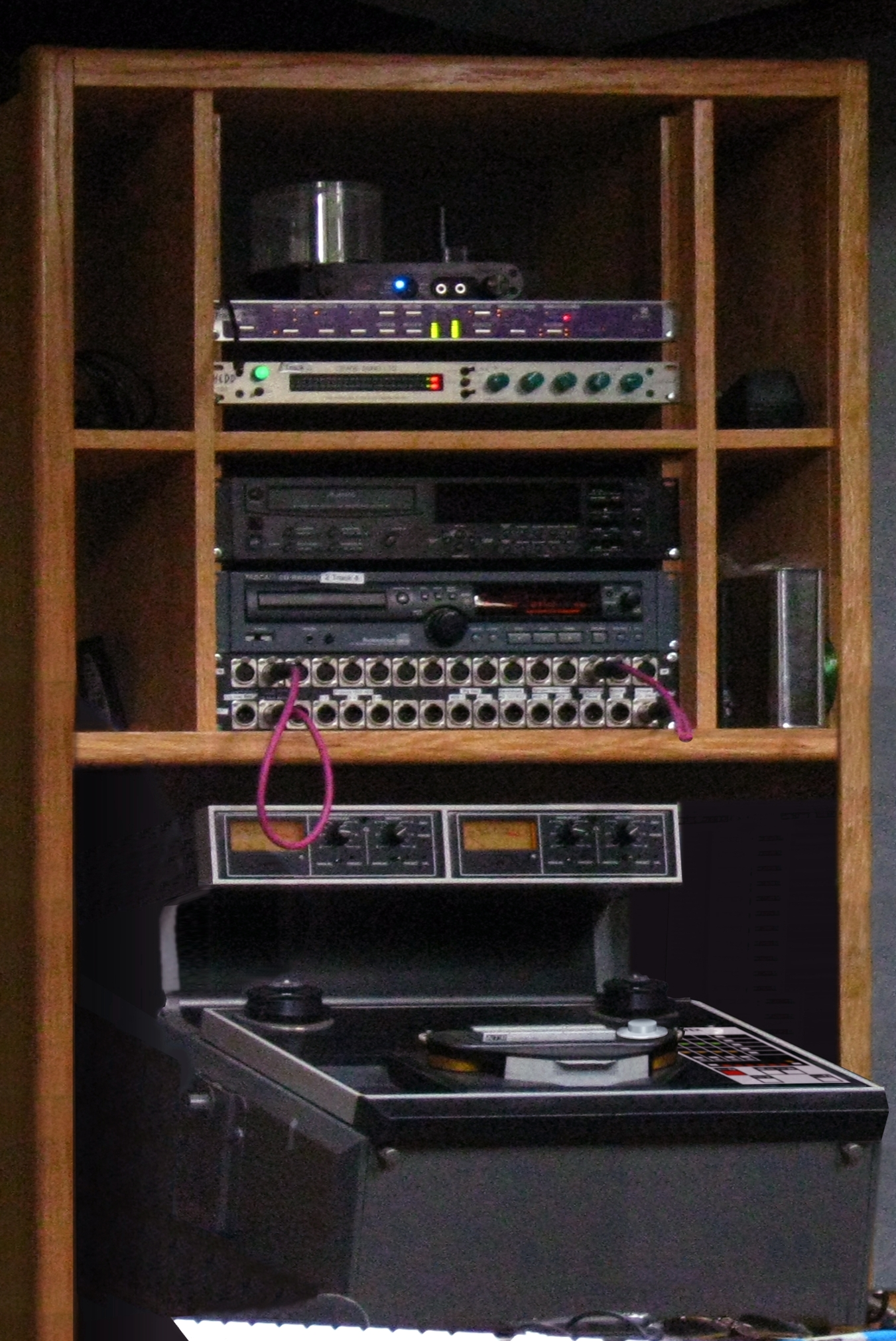
Ampex ATR-102 (bottom, Mike Spitz-modified)

Approximately two years after the release of the ATR-100, Ampex released the next generation Ampex ATR-102, which was essentially the same machine as the ATR-100, with the exception of some repositioned components and slight design modifications. In 2005, the ATR-102 was inducted into the TECnology Hall of Fame, an honor given to "products and innovations that have had an enduring impact on the development of audio technology."

== Evolution ==
Following the success of the ATR-102, Ampex went on to release the 16-track Ampex ATR-116 and the 24-track Ampex ATR-124. Both machines were designed with the same transport and similar electronics. The Ampex ATR-124, though still widely regarded as the most accurate and best sounding multitrack ever produced, was a financial disaster for Ampex, resulting in only 62 being produced. Base price for these recorders in 1980 was $48,500 for the sixteen track machine and $62,500 for the 24 track machine. With additional components and customizations, either machine could easily reach over $100,000 in cost when it was originally released. Because of this, the Ampex ATR-124 is extremely rare, extremely expensive to service and maintain, and is referred to by many engineers as "The King of All Tape Machines."
