= Fins (song) =

- German single picture sleeve

Single by Jimmy Buffett

from the album Volcano
- B-side: "Dreamsicle"
- Released: July 1979
- Recorded: May 1979
- Genre: Pop rock
- Length: 3:27
- Label: MCA
- Songwriters: Jimmy Buffett; Deborah McColl; Barry Chance; Tom Corcoran
- Producer: Norbert Putnam

Jimmy Buffett singles chronology
| "Mañana" (1978) | "Fins" (1979) | "Dreamsicle" (1979) |

Audio sample
- file; help

"Fins" is a song recorded by American singer-songwriter Jimmy Buffett. It was written by Buffett, Coral Reefer Band members Deborah McColl and Barry Chance, and author Tom Corcoran. It was released as a single (b/w "Dreamsicle") on MCA 41109 in July 1979.

It was first released on his 1979 album Volcano. It reached number 35 on the US Billboard Hot 100 and number 42 on the Easy Listening chart.

The title refers to the fins of metaphorical sharks, i.e. "land sharks", men who attempt to pick up the woman who is the subject of the song. She is said to feel like a remora due to the proximity of the predators.

Cash Box said that "swinging southern pop-rock, served up Florida style, compliments the neat double entendre." Record World said that Buffett’s "inspired vocals and a lively beat give this broad appeal.."

"Fins" was one of Buffett's more popular songs with fans, and is part of "The Big 8" that he had played at almost all of his concerts. Recorded live versions of the song appear on Feeding Frenzy, Buffett Live: Tuesdays, Thursdays, Saturdays, and the video Live by the Bay. Buffett usually began the song with a few bars of the "Main Title" theme from the movie Jaws. Concertgoers typically responded to the chorus line of "fins to the left, fins to the right" by extending their arms above their heads in a fin shape and moving them from left to right. Fin and shark themes became a prominent part of parrothead (Buffett fan) clothing and gear and feature in several of Buffett's commercial ventures such as Land Shark Lager beer.

In 2009, Buffett wrote new lyrics to the song for the Miami Dolphins football team. The song is played during home games at Hard Rock Stadium, and is used in tandem with the Dolphins' fight song after every touchdown the team scores.

== Personnel ==
According to the liner notes of the album.

- Jimmy Buffett - lead vocals, acoustic guitar
- Deborah McColl - backing vocals
- Keith Sykes - electric guitar, backing vocals
- Barry Chance - lead guitar
- Harry Dailey - bass
- Mike Utley - piano
- Andy McMahan - Fender Rhodes
- Greg "Fingers" Taylor - electric “Medium Walter” harp
- Russell Kunkel - drums and percussion
- Johnny Montezuma - anything and everything
- Jackie Dangler - pans
- Steve Forman - percussion

== Chart performance ==
| Chart (1979) | Peak position |
|---|---|
| Canadian RPM Top Singles | 64 |
| Canadian RPM Adult Contemporary Tracks | 35 |
| Canadian RPM Country Tracks | 62 |
| US Billboard Hot 100 | 35 |
| US Billboard Hot Adult Contemporary Tracks | 42 |
| US Cash Box Top 100 | 25 |
