= Gypsies in the Palace =

- Cover of the American 7 " single

Single by Jimmy Buffett

from the album Last Mango in Paris
- A-side: "Gypsies in the Palace"
- B-side: "Jolly Mon Sing"
- Released: 1985
- Recorded: 1985
- Genre: Country, Gulf and Western
- Length: 5:07
- Label: MCA
- Songwriters: Jimmy Buffett, Glenn Frey, Will Jennings
- Producers: Tony Brown, Jimmy Buffett

Jimmy Buffett singles chronology
"Who's the Blonde Stranger?" (1984)	"Gypsies in the Palace" (1985)	"If the Phone Doesn't Ring, It's Me" (1985)

"Gypsies in the Palace" is a song co-written and performed by American popular music singer-songwriter Jimmy Buffett. It was first released on his 1985 album Last Mango in Paris and was his first of three charting singles off that album. This song charted No. 56 on US Country.

== Plot ==
The song concerns a fictionalized Buffett who leaves his home in the care of the unnamed narrator and another man nicknamed "Snake" while he goes to perform elsewhere.

Once Buffett leaves, the two men are enticed by the food and alcohol he has in store and shoot the lock off his liquor cabinet, rationalizing this action by claiming the inventory will go to waste if not consumed. They then invite numerous people to the house to throw a wild party, where they have naked conga lines, throw people into his swimming pool, and partake in his commodities.

The homeowner calls the house and reports that he will return early, so the two rush out their guests and clean up the mess left during the party. When the homeowner returns, the two men point out all the work they've done around his house in his absence, then offer to watch the house again if the opportunity arises. In the outro, Glenn Frey calls Buffett to ask if he knows anyone who can housesit while he's on tour, to which Buffett enthusiastically recommends the narrator and Snake.

== Live Performances and Radio Edits ==
When performing the song in concert, Buffett calls it "The scariest song you'll hear tonight." Its performance is often preceded by a pre-recorded voice intoning: Narrated by James Mason.

"In days of old, when knights were bold,
And journeyed from their castles,
Trusty men were left behind;
Knights needed not the hassles.
They helped themselves to pig and peach,
And drank from King's own chalice;
Oh, it was a stirring sight,
These gypsies in the palace."

To which Buffett adds "And some things never change. Hit it, boys!"

Jimmy Buffett stated when he appeared on Jerry Jeff Walker's television show, that the song was based on true-life experience.

When released as a single, the song was trimmed for radio, excluding the dialogue introduction and other corners of the song for pacing purposes.

== Chart performance ==
Chart (1985)	Peak position
U.S. Billboard Hot Country Singles	56
