= Mailboat Records =

US record label

- Founded: 1999
- Founder: Jimmy Buffett
- Distributors: Self-distributed/INgrooves; RCA Records (select releases); Madacy Records (Select releases in Canada); Fontana North (Canada)
- Genre: Country-western, rock
- Country of origin: U.S.
- Location: Los Angeles, California
- Official website: www.mailboatrecords.com

Mailboat Records is an independent record label established in 1999 by American singer-songwriter Jimmy Buffett after his vanity label Margaritaville Records was absorbed by Island Records when they were sold to Universal Music Group, owner of Buffett's previous label MCA Records. Mailboat's first release was Buffett's Buffett Live: Tuesdays, Thursdays, Saturdays.

In addition to Buffett, the label's roster includes Dan Fogelberg, Bret Michaels, Boz Scaggs, Def Leppard (North America only), Sammy Hagar, Walter Becker, Jim Mayer, REO Speedwagon, and Mark Twain: Words & Music, a compilation CD featuring Jimmy Buffett as Huckleberry Finn, Clint Eastwood as Mark Twain, and narration by Garrison Keillor. Other featured artists on the Twain project include Brad Paisley, Sheryl Crow, Emmylou Harris, Vince Gill, Ricky Skaggs, and Joe Diffie. The Twain project is a benefit for the Mark Twain Boyhood Home & Museum in Hannibal, Missouri. Harold Sulman is the president of Mailboat Records.

== See also ==
- Jimmy Buffett discography
- Lists of record labels
