= Volcano (Jimmy Buffett song) =

- West German single picture sleeve

Single by Jimmy Buffett

from the album Volcano
- B-side: "Stranded on a Sandbar"
- Released: November 1979
- Recorded: May 1979
- Genre: Country rock; reggae; calypso; Gulf and Western
- Length: 3:37
- Label: MCA
- Songwriters: Jimmy Buffett, Keith Sykes, Harry Dailey
- Producer: Norbert Putnam

Jimmy Buffett singles chronology
"Dreamsicle" (1979)	"Volcano" (1979)	"Survive" (1979)

Audio sample
- file; help

"Volcano" is a song performed by American popular music singer-songwriter Jimmy Buffett. It was written by Jimmy Buffett, Keith Sykes, and Harry Dailey and released as a single (b/w "Stranded on a Sandbar") on MCA 41161 in November 1979. The song was first released on his 1979 album Volcano and reached No. 66 on the Billboard Hot 100, as well as peaking at No. 43 on the Hot Adult Contemporary Tracks chart.

== Background ==
Written in a calypso/reggae style, the song and its parent album are named for the then-dormant Soufrière Hills volcano on the island of Montserrat in the British West Indies where Buffett recorded the album in May 1979 at AIR Studios. Buffet drew inspiration for the song from relaxing at a hot spring at the volcano's base. The studio was destroyed by Hurricane Hugo in 1989 and never reopened; it sustained further damage after Soufrière Hills erupted in 1995.

The lyrics describe the narrator's anxiety about his possible whereabouts following the impending eruption of a volcano. The bridge before the final chorus mentions a number of place names, some important largely in the context of 1979:

But I don't want to land in New York City,

I don't want to land in Mexico.
I don't want to land on no Three Mile Island,
I don't want to see my skin a-glow.

Don't want to land in Comanche Skypark, (Note: Camanche [sic] Skypark (FAA Identifier: CA19) was a small airport at 38°15′49.7″N 120°55′23.8″W, 5 nautical miles (9.3 km) south of Ione, California, near the north shore of Camanche Reservoir. Buffett was flown into the airstrip for two concerts on 10 and 11 June 1978 for the 5th Annual Mountain Aire '78 at the Calaveras County Fairgrounds in Angels Camp, California, where he co-headlined with Jackson Browne and Warren Zevon.)
or in Nashville, Tennessee.
I don't want to land in no San Juan Airport
or the Yukon Territory.

Don't want to land no San Diego.
Don't want to land in no Buzzards Bay.
I don't want to land on no Ayatollah.

I got nothin' more to say.

Cash Box said that the song "is flavorful and timely, with lots of offbeat references." Record World said that "The Carribean ambience runs from the pervasive percussion to the sparkling bass pipes."

"Volcano" is one of Buffett's more popular songs with fans, and is part of "The Big 8" that he played at almost all of his concerts. Recorded live versions of the song appear on Feeding Frenzy, Buffett Live: Tuesdays, Thursdays, Saturdays, and the video Live by the Bay. The place names in the final bridge were often altered in concert to reflect more recent news. The song was also re-recorded and released for Rock Band on June 3, 2008, with the last two lines listed above changed to, "I want to be a couch potato / Just play Rock Band every day."

The song became especially popular on radio stations in the Pacific Northwest (particularly around Portland, Oregon) in the spring of 1980 during the unrest that led to the eruption of Mount St. Helens.

== Popular culture ==
- Volcano was recorded at AIR Studios in Montserrat and was played at the London benefit concert "Music for Montserrat", arranged by Sir George Martin to support the island after the twin disasters of Hurricane Hugo and the eruptions of the Soufrière Hills volcano. The lyrics were changed to fit the context. For example, the phrase "We've got to help our friends in Montserrat" appeared in the song.
- When performed at concerts, a video of the song on Rock Band was shown.
- Volcano is the anthem for MVO Tremors, a Montserratian association football club.

== Chart performance ==
Chart (1979)	Peak position
U.S. Billboard Hot 100	66
U.S. Billboard Hot Adult Contemporary Tracks	43
Canadian RPM Adult Contemporary Tracks	1
