= Pencil Thin Mustache =

1974 song by Jimmy Buffett

- Cover of the German 7 " single

Single by Jimmy Buffett

from the album Living & Dying in ¾ Time
- B-side: "Brand New Country Star"
- Released: August 1974
- Recorded: October 1973
- Studio: Woodland (Nashville, Tennessee)
- Genre: Country rock; Western swing; Gulf and Western
- Length: 2:47
- Label: ABC Dunhill
- Songwriter: Jimmy Buffett
- Producer: Don Gant

Jimmy Buffett singles chronology
"Come Monday" (1974)	"Pencil Thin Mustache" (1974)	"A Pirate Looks at Forty" (1974)

Audio sample
- file; help

"Pencil Thin Mustache" is a song written and performed by American popular-music singer and songwriter Jimmy Buffett. It was released as a single (with "Brand New Country Star") on Dunhill D-15011 in August 1974. It was first released on his album of 1974, Living and Dying in ¾ Time. It just missed the Billboard Hot 100 at number 101 on Bubbling Under Hot 100 Singles, and reached number 44 on the Easy Listening chart.

The song, written in a Western swing style, is a nostalgic look by Buffett at the popular culture of his childhood. The title refers to the mustache style of the film character Boston Blackie.

Buffett refers to a number of other persons, characters, and products of the period, including Ricky Ricardo, Andy Devine, Sky (King)'s niece Penny, American Bandstand, Disneyland, Ramar of the Jungle, Bwana, Errol Flynn, the Sheik of Araby, and Brylcreem. The lyrics also say that in the 1950s, "only jazz musicians were smokin' marijuana".

Cash Box called it a "laid back honky tonker with incredible lyrics and a totally believable performance from Jimmy." Record World called it a "rinky-tink razmataz of a new soft shoe filled with nostalgia references."

Buffett has stated, "the thing about writing a song like this is that the older you get, the more people there are who need an explanation of the characters in the song. I shudder to think how old Sky King's niece Penny is today. It all started with that two-toned Ricky Ricardo jacket. I can't wait for them to come back."

"Pencil Thin Mustache" is a popular song with Buffett fans, and was often played at concerts, but is not part of "The Big 8" songs that he played at almost all of his concerts. Recorded live versions of the song appear on You Had to Be There and Buffett Live: Tuesdays, Thursdays, Saturdays. Billboard described the song as "very well done and quite funny."

== Chart performance ==
Chart (1974)	Peak position
Canadian RPM Top Singles	75
Canadian RPM Adult Contemporary Tracks	22
US Adult Contemporary (Billboard)	44
US Billboard Bubbling Under Hot 100	101
