= A Pirate Looks at Forty =

Single by Jimmy Buffett

from the album A1A
- A-side: "A Pirate Looks at Forty"
- B-side: "Presents to Send You"
- Released: February 1975
- Studio: Woodland (Nashville, Tennessee)
- Genre: Country; Gulf and Western
- Length: 3:57
- Label: Dunhill; D-15029 (US, 7")
- Songwriter: Jimmy Buffett
- Producer: Don Gant

Jimmy Buffett singles chronology
"Pencil Thin Mustache" (1974)	"A Pirate Looks at Forty" (1975)	"Door Number Three" (1974)

Audio sample
- file; help

Audio
- "A Pirate Looks at Forty" by Jimmy Buffett on YouTube
- "A Pirate Looks at Forty" (live, 1978) by Jimmy Buffett on YouTube

"A Pirate Looks at Forty" is a song written and performed by American singer-songwriter Jimmy Buffett. It was first released on his 1974 album A1A and "Presents to Send You" is the B-side of the single.

Buffett wrote the song about Phillip Clark, at the Chart Room where Buffett first performed after his move to Key West, Florida. The song contains the bittersweet confession of a modern-day, washed-up drug smuggler as he looks back on the first 40 years of his life, expresses lament that his preferred vocation of piracy on the high seas was long gone by the time he was born, and ponders his future.

For radio play, the song was shortened by deleting the fourth verse for the single release. Cash Box said the song has "an almost reggae progression, fine guitar playing and lead solo, [and] moving lyrics". Record World said that "This limitless piece of demographic dauntlessness should ship him out of port under more steam than anything since 'Come Monday.'" The song is one of Buffett's more popular, and is part of "The Big 8" that he played at almost all of his concerts, and always during the second set.

== Chart performance ==
Chart (1974)	Peak position
U.S. Billboard Bubbling Under Hot 100	101

== Cover versions ==
Jack Johnson has been known to cover this song in many of his smaller concerts. It was officially released on the soundtrack to The September Sessions in 2002.

Bob Dylan and Joan Baez performed the song during their 1982 reunion performance at the Peace Sunday rally in Pasadena, California.

Dave Matthews alongside Jack Johnson performed the song at Kokua Benefit Concert at the Waikiki Shell in Honolulu in 2008. The Killers performed the song on the Living Room Concert Series for iHeartRadio in 2020. Dave Matthews Band performed the song to open their show at The Gorge Amphitheatre the day after Buffett's death in 2023.

Songwriter/Musician T.J. O'Neill collaborated with long-time friend Stick Figure on the song which was his first single in 2019. It also featured reggae artists KBong and Johnny Cosmic. The music video was shot live on location at a resort in Mexico with thousands of fans surrounding the singers while performing.
