= Cheeseburger in Paradise (song) =

- Cover of the Japanese 7-inch single (Note: The U.S. single did not have a picture cover but was issued with a standard ABC Records cover.)

Single by Jimmy Buffett

from the album Son of a Son of a Sailor
- B-side: "African Friend"
- Released: March 1978
- Genre: Country rock; Gulf and Western
- Length: 2:51
- Label: ABC
- Songwriter: Jimmy Buffett
- Producer: Norbert Putnam

Jimmy Buffett singles chronology
"Changes in Latitudes, Changes in Attitudes" (1977)	"Cheeseburger in Paradise" (1978)	"Livingston Saturday Night" (1978)

Audio sample
- file; help

Audio
- "Cheeseburger in Paradise" (studio version) by Jimmy Buffett on YouTube
- "Cheeseburger in Paradise" (live, 1999) by Jimmy Buffett on YouTube

Live video
- "Cheeseburger in Paradise" (live) by Jimmy Buffett on YouTube

"Cheeseburger in Paradise" is a song written and performed by the American singer Jimmy Buffett. It appeared on his 1978 album Son of a Son of a Sailor and was released as a single, reaching No. 32 on the Billboard Hot 100. "Cheeseburger in Paradise" became one of Buffett's signature songs, and was selected as the first track on his greatest hits album Songs You Know by Heart.

== Content ==
"Cheeseburger in Paradise" is about a man who tries to amend his carnivorous habits by eating healthy foods such as sunflower seeds. The song was inspired by a boating incident in which Buffett was forced to eat only canned food and peanut butter. He eventually made it to Roadtown on the island of Tortola, and celebrated with a cheeseburger.

== Reception ==
Cash Box praised the bass line and vocals. Record World said that it "rocks with a hint of country, and has a hand-clapping segment that is especially appealing" and that it makes for "most amusing listening."

== Chart performance ==
1978 chart performance for "Cheeseburger in Paradise"
Chart (1978)	Peak position
Canadian RPM Top Singles	27
US Billboard Hot 100	32

2023 chart performance for "Cheeseburger in Paradise"
Chart (2023)	Peak position
US Hot Rock & Alternative Songs (Billboard)	22

== Diner ==
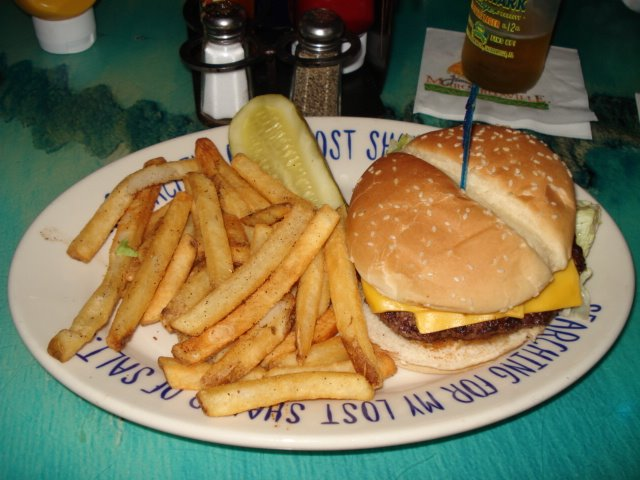
A Cheeseburger in Paradise at Jimmy Buffett's Margaritaville

In 2002, Buffett's company Margaritaville Holdings LLC licensed the name of the song to OSI Restaurant Partners as the name of the Buffett-themed Cheeseburger in Paradise restaurant chain. In 2006, the restaurant had 38 locations in 17 states in the United States and one in Sydney, Australia. By 2018 only a single restaurant in Secaucus, New Jersey remained of the chain. The last location closed in September 2020.

A Cheeseburger in Paradise is a menu item at Buffett-owned Margaritaville Cafes located in the United States, Mexico, Canada, and the Caribbean, as well as being on the menu at his sister Lucy's restaurant "Lulu's" in Gulf Shores, Alabama.

== Misheard lyrics ==
According to the lyrics found on the vinyl sleeve, Buffett sings "cheeseburger 'is' Paradise" twice throughout the song. It is unclear whether he is actually saying "in" or "is", but "cheeseburger "is" Paradise" can clearly be heard during live performances. Whether this is a fact for the studio version has not been confirmed. In the second chorus, another common lyrical confusion is the line "medium rare with Muenster'd be nice", which may be mistaken for mustard.
