= Tom Corcoran (writer) =

American novelist (1943–2023)

Thomas Franklin Corcoran
- Born: Thomas Franklin Corcoran; July 13, 1943; Cleveland, Ohio, U.S.
- Died: January 16, 2023 (aged 79); Lakeland, Florida, U.S.
- Education: Miami University of Ohio
- Occupation: Author
- Partner: Judith Matheny Corcoran
- Website: tomcorcoran.net

Thomas Franklin Corcoran (July 13, 1943 – January 16, 2023) was an American writer of mystery novels as well as three books on classic Ford Mustangs.

== Biography ==
Corcoran was born to Ralph A. and Mary Louise (Franklin) Corcoran in Cleveland, Ohio. He had two younger sisters and grew up in Cleveland Heights, Ohio and Shaker Heights, Ohio. He graduated from Miami University and served in the United States Navy. He was stationed in Key West beginning in 1968 and got involved in the literary scene, meeting several notable writers.

He was a long time bartender at the Chart Room in Key West, where he served Jimmy Buffett his first beer in the city.

== Personal life ==
Corcoran married Judith Matheny Corcoran, whom he met in Key West. She died in 1986.

Corcoran was friends with Jimmy Buffett and shot photographs for seven of Buffett's album covers, as well as co-wrote the hits "Fins" and "Cuban Crime of Passion".

Corcoran died from cancer in Lakeland, Florida, on January 16, 2023, at the age of 79.

== Selected bibliography ==
- Shelby Mustang (1992) ISBN 9780879386207
- The Mango Opera (1998)
- Gumbo Limbo (1999)
- Bone Island Mambo (2001)
- Ultimate Muscle (2002) ISBN 9780760314876
- Octopus Alibi (2003)
- Air Dance Iguana (2005) ISBN 9780312941895
- Jimmy Buffett-The Key West Years (2006)
- Hawk Channel Chase (2009)
- The Quick Adiós (Times Six) (2012)
- Triple in Paradise (2012)
- Crime Almost Pays (2015) ISBN 9781940214047
- Guava Moon Revenge (2018) ISBN 9781940214115
- The Cayo Hueso Maze (2020) ISBN 9781940214139
