= Come Monday =

- German picture sleeve

Single by Jimmy Buffett

from the album Living & Dying in ¾ Time
- B-side: "The Wino and I Know"
- Released: April 1974
- Recorded: 1974
- Genre: Country, Gulf and Western
- Length: 3:06
- Label: Dunhill
- Songwriter: Jimmy Buffett
- Producer: Don Gant

Jimmy Buffett singles chronology
"Saxophones" (1974)	"Come Monday" (1974)	"Pencil Thin Mustache" (1974)

Audio sample
- file; help

"Come Monday" is a song written and recorded by American singer-songwriter Jimmy Buffett. It was first released on his 1974 album Living & Dying in ¾ Time.

== Content ==
Buffett wrote the song to his future wife while he was on tour. At a live performance in 1974, Buffett mentioned that he had written the song heading out to California the previous year, meaning that it would have been written as he was "heading up to San Francisco for the Labor Day weekend show" in 1973. He opened those weekend shows in Marin County for Country Joe McDonald at the Lion's Share club in San Anselmo and the song was written at the Howard Johnson's that Buffett was staying at in Mill Valley. The single version replaces the third line, "I've got my Hush Puppies on," with "I've got my hiking shoes on."

It is one of Buffett's more popular songs, and is part of "The Big 8" that he played at almost all of his concerts, typically changing the line "I just can't wait to see you again" to "It's so nice to be in...(location of show)...again".

== Chart performance ==
"Come Monday" was Buffett's first Top 40 hit single, reaching No. 30 on the Billboard Hot 100 as well as No. 3 Easy Listening and No. 58 Country. It also reached number 12 in Australia and was his most popular song there.

Chart (1974)	Peak position
Canada Top Singles (RPM)	23
US Adult Contemporary (Billboard)	3
US Billboard Hot 100	30
US Hot Country Songs (Billboard)	58
