= Michael Utley =

American songwriter (born 1947)

- Utley Performing With The Coral Reefer Band, June 2009

Background information
- Born: Michael Edward Utley; January 12, 1947 (age 79); Blytheville, Arkansas
- Genres: Gulf and Western; country; folk; rock
- Occupations: Keyboard player; Producer
- Instrument: Keyboards
- Formerly of: Coral Reefer Band

Michael Edward Utley (born January 12, 1947) is an American musician, songwriter, record producer, and was the musical director and keyboard player for Jimmy Buffett's Coral Reefer Band. After Buffett's death, he retired from touring and was replaced by his son Mick who had been in the band in a part-time role for a few years.

== Early life and education ==
Utley was born in Blytheville in Mississippi County, Arkansas. In 1969, he graduated from the University of Arkansas with a degree in zoology. He then debated either taking pre-med lab exam or going to Memphis and help Tony Joe White record his second album and chose the latter.

In college, he was a member of the Sigma Chi fraternity. He was recognized by Sigma Chi as a Significant Sig in 2017.

== Career ==
In 1970, Atlantic Records executive Jerry Wexler invited Utley to work at Criteria Studios. Utley worked with the house band for Atlantic Records in Miami, Florida's Criteria Studios backing performers such as Aretha Franklin, Jerry Jeff Walker, and the Allman Brothers and in California playing with Rita Coolidge and Kris Kristofferson.

In 1973, Jerry Jeff Walker recruited Utley to play keyboard instruments on Buffett's first major label album, A White Sport Coat and a Pink Crustacean. Utley continued to work with other performers in the mid-1970s while appearing on Buffett's subsequent albums until Buffett's 1977 breakout Changes in Latitudes, Changes in Attitudes when he joined the Coral Reefer Band full-time.

Utley has title credit on several albums, the first being an instrumental record with fellow Coral Reefer Band member Robert Greenidge titled Mad Music.

Utley has produced or co-produced several of Buffett albums beginning with One Particular Harbour in 1983. From 1981-2023, he toured full-time with the Coral Reefers.

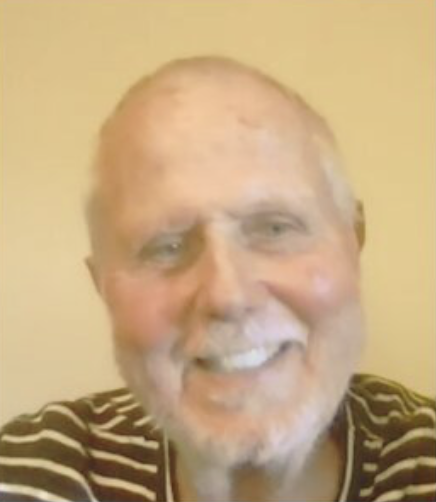
Musician, songwriter and record producer Michael Utley is interviewed by Paul Leslie.

== Personal life ==
Utley's son, Mick, is married to Erin McAnally, the daughter of Mac McAnally, also a member of the Coral Reefer Band. After Buffett's death Michael retired from touring and his son Mick took over the role of playing the keyboards fulltime in the Coral Reefer Band.

== In popular media ==
During Jimmy Buffett's 1979 song "Volcano," Utley's name is mentioned. Right before the first solo, Jimmy Buffett says "Mr. Utley." This leads into the solo.

== Discography ==
- Robert Greenidge & Michael Utley (as Club Trini). Mad Music MCA 5695. (1986). re-released on CD (11/05).
- Robert Greenidge & Michael Utley (as Club Trini). Jubilee (1987). re-released on CD (12/05).
- Robert Greenidge & Michael Utley (as Club Trini). Heat (1988).
- Robert Greenidge & Michael Utley (as Club Trini). Club Trini. (1996).
- Robert Greenidge & Michael Utley (as Club Trini). Back in Town. (1999).
- Robert Greenidge & Michael Utley (as Club Trini). Margaritaville Cafe: Late Night Live. (2000).

== See also ==
- Jimmy Buffett discography
