= Will Kimbrough discography =

This is the discography of American singer-songwriter Will Kimbrough. Several albums credit Will Kimbrough as producer and are listed along with other albums where credited as a musician.

== Solo albums ==
- 2000: This (Waxysilver)
- 2002: Home Away (Gravity)
- 2006: Americanitis (Daphne)
- 2010: Wings (Daphne)
- 2014: Sideshow Love (Daphne)
- 2019: I Like It Down Here (Daphne)
- 2020: Spring Break (Daphne)
- 2024: For The Life Of Me (Daphne)

== Compilations ==
- 2003: Godsend (Unreleased Songs, 1994–2002) (Waxysilver)

== EPs ==
- 2007: Will Kimbrough (EP) (Daphne)

== As a member of the Bis-Quits ==
- 1993: Bis-Quits (Oh Boy Records)

== As a member of Daddy ==
- 2005: At the Women's Club (Cedar Creek)
- 2009: For a Second Time (Cedar Creek)
- 2018: Let's Do This (Daphne)

== With Brigitte DeMeyer ==
- 2017: Mockingbird Soul (BDM Music)

== As primary artist/song contributor ==
- 1998: Fireworks, Vol. 2: 25 Explosive Tracks (Sound Asleep) – track 7, "Godsend"; track 8, "Diamond In A Garbage Can"
- 2006: various artists – A Case For Case: A Tribute to the Songs of Peter Case (Hungry For Music) – track 2-09, "Moves Me Deeply"
- 2006: various artists – KGSR Broadcasts Vol. 14 (KGSR) – track 1–10, "Dancin' Circles 'Round The Sun (Epic Tetus Speaks)" (with Rodney Crowell)
- 2013: various artists – Skrang: Sounds Like Bobby Sutliff (Paisley Pop) – track 7, "Off and On"
- 2016: various artists – Feel Like Going Home: The Songs of Charlie Rich (Memphis International) – track 4, "Sittin' and Thinkin'"

== As composer ==
- 2003: Fastball – Live from Jupiter Records (Jupiter) – track 7, "Life" (co-written with Miles Zuniga)
- 2004: Jimmy Buffett – License to Chill (Mailboat / RCA) – track 5, "Piece of Work"
- 2006: Jimmy Buffett – Take The Weather With You (Mailboat / RCA) – track 2, "Party at the End of the World" (co-written with Jimmy Buffett, Roger Guth, and Peter Mayer)
- 2007: Adrienne Young – Room to Grow (AddieBelle) – track 1, "All for Good"; track 3, "Room to Grow"; track 6, "High Flyin' Dream"; track 9, "Givin Up the Flight" (all co-written with Adrienne Young)
- 2009: Jimmy Buffett – Buffet Hotel (Mailboat) – track 1, "Nobody from Nowhere" (co-written with Tommy Womack); track 2, "Wings" and track 9, "Surfing in a Hurricane" (both co-written with Jimmy Buffett); track 12, "A Lot to Drink About" (co-written with Jimmy Buffett and Mac McAnally)
- 2013: Jimmy Buffett – Songs from St. Somewhere (Mailboat) – track 7, " I Want To Go Back To Cartagena" (co-written with Jimmy Buffett, Peter Mayer, and Roger Guth); track 8, "Soulfully"; track 12, "The Rocket That Grandpa Rode" (co-written with Jimmy Buffett, Mac McAnally, Peter Mayer, and Roger Guth)
- 2014: Sara Jean Kelley – The Waiting Place EP (Blue Jean) – track 3, "Trains" (co-written with Sara Jean Kelley)
- 2014: Hard Working Americans – Hard Working Americans (Melvin) – track 2, "Another Train" (co-written with Gwil Owen); track 10, "I Don't Have A Gun" (co-written with Tommy Womack)

== As producer ==
- 2004: Adrienne Young and Little Sadie – Plow to the End of the Row (AddieBelle)
- 2004: Adrienne Young – The Art of Virtue (AddieBelle)
- 2005: Willy Clay Band – Rebecca Drive (Blackstone)
- 2009: Bonnie Bishop – Things I Know (Montage)
- 2013: Willie Sugarcapps (The Royal Potato Family)
- 2014: Magnolia Springs (The Royal Potato Family)
- 2015: Bill Toms and Hard Rain – Deep in the Shadows (Terraplane)
- 2016: Doug Seegers – Going Down to the River (Rounder)
- 2023: Eilen Jewell – Get Behind the Wheel (Signature Sounds)

== As sideman ==
=== With Jeff Black ===
- 2003: Honey and Salt (Lotos Nile Music)
- 2005: Tin Lily (Dualtone)

=== With Jimmy Buffett ===
- 2004: License to Chill (Mailboat / RCA)
- 2006: Take The Weather With You (Mailboat / RCA)
- 2009: Buffet Hotel (Mailboat)

=== With Kate Campbell ===
- 2003: Twang on a Wire (Evangeline)
- 2004: Sing Me Out (Compadre)

=== With Rodney Crowell ===
- 2003: Fate's Right Hand (2003)
- 2005: The Outsider (Columbia)
- 2014: Tarpaper Sky (New West)

=== With Jeff Finlin ===
- 2002: Somewhere South of Wonder (Gravity)
- 2006: Angels in Disguise (Korova)

=== With Gretchen Peters ===
- 2012: Hello Cruel World (Scarlet Letter)
- 2015: Blackbirds (Scarlet Letter)

=== With Amy Rigby ===
- 2001: The Sugar Tree (Koch)
- 2003: Til the Wheels Fall Off (Spit & Polish) – guitar on track 12, "Breakup Boots"

=== With Todd Snider ===
- 1996: Step Right Up (MCA / Margaritaville)
- 1998: Viva Satellite (MCA)
- 2000: Happy to be Here (Oh Boy)
- 2002: New Connection (Oh Boy)
- 2004: East Nashville Skyline (Oh Boy)
- 2006: The Devil You Know (New Door Records)

=== With Vienna Teng ===
- 2002: The Waking Hour (Virt)
- 2004: Warm Strangers (Virt) – guitar on track 8, "Homecoming (Walter's Song)"

=== With Will and the Bushmen ===
- 1985: Gawk (Mustang)
- 1989: Will and the Bushmen (SBK)
- 1991: Blunderbuss (Core)

=== With Tommy Womack ===
- 2000: Stubborn (Sideburn)
- 2002: Circus Town (Sideburn)

=== Also appears on ===
- 1993: The Bis-quits – The Bis-quits (Oh Boy)
- 1995: Brad Jones – Gilt Flake (Ginger)
- 1996: Kim Richey – Bitter Sweet (Mercury)
- 1998: Jason Reed – Iowana (Motel Juniors)
- 2001: The Autumn Defense – The Green Hour (Broadmoor)
- 2000: Park Chisolm – Park Chisolm EP (Orchard)
- 2000: Jess Klein – Draw Them Near (Rykodisc)
- 2000: Josh Rouse – Home (Slow River)
- 2000: Matthew Ryan – East Autumn Grin (A&M)
- 2001: Neilson Hubbard – Why Men Fail (Parasol)
- 2001: Jenifer Jackson – Birds (Ulftone)
- 2002: Steve Forbert – Any Old Time: Songs Of Jimmie Rodgers (Koch)
- 2002: Donal Hinely – We Built a Fire (Scuffletown)
- 2002: Garrison Starr – Songs From Takeoff to Landing (Back Porch)
- 2003: Billy Joe Shaver – Freedom's Child (Compadre)
- 2003: Greg Trooper – Floating (2003)
- 2004: Mindy Smith – One Moment More (Vanguard)
- 2005: Amy Loftus – Straight To Amy (Appletree)
- 2008: Jessie Baylin – Firesight (Verve Forecast)
- 2008: Hayes Carll Trouble in Mind (Lost Highway Records)
- 2010: Chely Wright – Lifted Off the Ground (Vanguard)
- 2011: Rod Picott – Welding Burns (Welding Rod)
- 2013: Quique González – Daiquiri Blues (LastTour)
- 2014: Robby Hecht: Robby Hecht (Andy Childs / Old Man Henry)
- 2015: Beken – Troubadour (Thirty Tigers)
- 2015: Amy Black – The Muscle Shoals Sessions (Reuben)
- 2015: Edward David Anderson – Lower Alabama: The Loxley Sessions (The Royal Potato Family)
- 2015: Shemekia Copeland – Outskirts Of Love (Alligator)
- 2015: Dean Owens – Into the Sea (Drumfire)
- 2016: Michael McDermott – Willow Springs (Pauper Sky)
- 2016: Lauren Murphy – El Dorado (self-released)
- 2016: The Westies – Six on the Out (Pauper Sky)
- 2017: Bill Scorzari – Through the Waves (self-released)
- 2023: Eilen Jewell – Get Behind the Wheel (Signature Sounds)
