= Room to Grow =

Room to Grow may refer to:

- Room to Grow (video game), 2021 video developed and published by Mischka Kamener
- Room to Grow (album), 2007 album by Adrienne Young
