= Surfing in a Hurricane =

Song by Jimmy Buffett

from the album Buffet Hotel
- Released: December 8, 2009
- Recorded: 2009
- Genre: Pop rock, Surf rock
- Length: 4:26
- Label: Mailboat
- Songwriter(s): Jimmy Buffett, Will Kimbrough
- Producer(s): Mac McAnally; Michael Utley

"Surfing in a Hurricane" is a song performed by American popular music singer-songwriter Jimmy Buffett, and written by Buffett and Will Kimbrough. It is the ninth track from his 2009 album Buffet Hotel.

== Live performances ==
The song had been introduced to setlists over eleven months before its studio recording release on Buffet Hotel. Its live debut was on January 13, 2009 at the Anegada Reef Hotel in Anegada, British Virgin Islands. "Surfing in a Hurricane" would remain in the setlist for every show during that year's Summerzcool Tour, where it would be promoted as Buffett's first surf song. While "Surfing in a Hurricane" was Buffett's first penned surf song, he actually did a surf rendition of "Up on the House Top" on his 1996 Christmas album Christmas Island.

== Hurricane Florence ==
"Surfing in a Hurricane" gained notability in September 2018 when Buffett tweeted that he would join Folly Beach surfers for one last ride before Hurricane Florence would hit. News outlets immediately noted Buffett's tweet as him bringing "Surfing in a Hurricane" to fruition; some fans responded to the tweet with concern for his safety, while others criticized Buffett for potentially influencing others to attempt a dangerous act. Shannon Green of the Orlando Sentinel called Buffett's tweet irresponsible, and noted that someone with such a large fanbase should be more careful how about influential his words are. However, some of this criticism is thought to derive from people not realizing his tweet was a direct quote from his song "Surfing in a Hurricane", and that he was not encouraging such reckless behavior. Buffett immediately sent an updated tweet, advising that nobody should attempt anything dangerous, respect mother nature and abide by the authority's warnings.
