= Down Hearted Blues (album) =

Studio album by Eilen Jewell
- Released: September 22, 2017
- Studio: Audio Lab (Garden City, Idaho)
- Genre: Blues
- Length: 38:05
- Label: Signature Sounds
- Producer: Eilen Jewell and her band

Eilen Jewell chronology
Sundown Over Ghost Town (2015)	Down Hearted Blues (2017)	Gypsy (2019)

Down Hearted Blues is the seventh studio album by American singer-songwriter Eilen Jewell. Recorded at Audio Lab in Garden City, Idaho, it was released on September 22, 2017 through Signature Sounds. The album features Jewell and her band with guest musicians covering blues songs by Willie Dixon and other 20th century American blues artists, such as the title song, written by Lovie Austin and Alberta Hunter.

== Background ==
Jewell learned guitar at age fifteen in order to play songs in her father's album collection by bluesmen Mississippi John Hurt and Howlin' Wolf. Jewell's interest in roots music led her to Jason Beeks, whom she met in Boston and eventually married. Beeks and Jewell teamed up with Jerry Miller beginning in 2005, creating new music that carried on the early forms of blues, country, and rockabilly that the members of the group would regularly listen to, leading to Down Hearted Blues. Jewell had been collecting a list of songs for recording since childhood, and also found material from listening to Massachusetts Institute of Technology radio station WMBR's John Funke and his program Backwoods.

== Reception ==
Reviewers noted that Down Hearted Blues was Jewell's second album of cover songs, after she released Butcher Holler in 2010, featuring a dozen Loretta Lynn songs. Writing for American Blues Scene, Barry Kerzner saw Jewell and her band successfully navigating the "tightrope" of creativity and preservation, saying that with their guests, "together, these musicians are positively scintillating in their artfully understated playing, which is subtle, compelling, and offers a surprising amount of depth." Writers saw musical agility, remarking on the swings in style from a "back-porch picker" like "Nothing in Rambling" by Memphis Minnie to a propulsive song like Big Maybelle's "Don’t Leave Poor Me".

The album closer demonstrates the close association of early country music with the blues, as Jewell fits Moonshine Kate's "The Poor Girl’s Story", which Kerzner writes "as performed here in a delectable Grand Ole Opry vein that hits home", alongside blues classics.

== Track listing ==
1. It’s Your Voodoo Working (Charles Sheffield) - 3:01
2. Another Night to Cry (Milton Leeds, Ed Nelson) - 2:54
3. You’ll Be Mine (Willie Dixon) - 2:37
4. Down Hearted Blues (Lovie Austin, Alberta Hunter) - 3:41
5. I’m a Little Mixed Up (James, Johnson) - 3:02
6. You Gonna Miss Me (Earnest Johnson, Albert Washington) - 2:44
7. Walking With Frankie (Frankie Lee Sims, Johnny Vincent) - 3:51
8. Nothing in Rambling (Minnie Lawlers) - 3:05
9. Don’t Leave Poor Me (Leroy Kirkland, Charlie Singleton, Maybelle Smith) - 2:35
10. Crazy Mixed Up World (Dixon) - 2:29
11. You Know My Love (Dixon) - 4:24
12. The Poor Girl’s Story (Fiddlin' John Carson) - 3:42

== Personnel ==
Credits adapted from the album's liner notes.

=== Musicians ===
- Jason Beek – drums, washboard
- Eilen Jewell – vocals, guitar, hammond organ
- Shawn Supra – upright bass
- Jerry Miller – acoustic guitar, electric guitar, mandolin
- Steve Fulton – piano, banjo
- Jonah Shue - violin
- Curtis Stigers - saxophone

=== Production ===
- Jason Beek – producer
- Eilen Jewell – producer
- Shawn Supra – producer
- Jerry Miller – producer
- Steve Fulton – recording, mixing
- Pat Storey – recording
- Jim DeMain – mastering
- Joanna Chattman – photography
- Meghan Dewar – design
