= Gypsy (Eilen Jewell album) =

Studio album by Eilen Jewell
- Released: August 16, 2019
- Studio: Audio Lab (Garden City, Idaho)
- Genre: Americana
- Length: 36:23
- Label: Signature Sounds
- Producer: Eilen Jewell and Jason Beek

Eilen Jewell chronology
Down Hearted Blues (2017)	Gypsy (2019)	Get Behind the Wheel (2023)

Gypsy is the eighth studio album by American singer-songwriter Eilen Jewell. Produced by Jewell and Jason Beek, it was released on August 16, 2019, through Signature Sounds. Critical reception was positive, with reviewers noting the prominence of political content compared to Jewell's previous albums, and Jewell's several varying musical styles.

== Background ==
Gypsy is the first album by Jewell and her band since 2017's Down Hearted Blues, an album of vintage blues cover songs, and the first release featuring original songs in four years since Sundown Over Ghost Town in 2015. The album also includes guest musicians, and Jewell playing electric guitar, a first for her studio recordings.

== Reception ==
Critics were positive when reviewing Gypsy, with several noting the increased political content of Jewell's songwriting. Writing in Country Standard Time, Dan MacIntosh recognized the use of music to navigate difficult situations, remarking that "when reading between the lines, it's obvious Jewell is distressed and disgusted with the politics of modern America. Singing about these hard times is one good cathartic way (to) face such troubles, though." Thinking of the singer's ability to mix country, blues, and rock styles, and write words that tackle paradoxes of human life, Jim Hynes of Glide magazine referred to remarkable musical skill and writing, calling Jewell "a master at bringing polar opposites into a cohesive statement." Furthering the point, Steve Horowitz notes that Jewell "musically wanders all over the Americana map", and asserts that wandering is purposeful: "Jewell sings songs of heartbreak and those of joy, of personal obsessions and others of public concerns. The important point is that her roving presence is ever-present. She may be a gypsy, but she’s not lost. Jewell understands the journey itself is the destination of life."

== Track listing ==
All songs by Eilen Jewell except (3)

1. Crawl - 3:38
2. Miles to Go - 3:16
3. You Cared Enough to Lie (Pinto Bennett, Mark Alan Webb) - 2:47
4. 79 Cents (The Meow Song) - 2:59
5. Beat The Drum - 3:13
6. Gypsy - 3:21
7. These Blues - 2:45
8. Working Hard For Your Love - 3:03
9. Who Else But You - 3:36
10. Witness - 2:52
11. Hard Times - 2:42
12. Fear - 2:11

== Personnel ==
Credits adapted from the album's liner notes.

=== Musicians ===
==== Eilen Jewell Band ====
- Eilen Jewell – electric guitar, acoustic guitar, organ, vocals
- Jason Beek – drums, percussion, vocals
- Jerry Miller – electric guitars, mandolin
- Shawn Supra – upright bass

==== Special Guests ====
- Kevan Ash – trombone
- Mavis Beek – vocals
- Steve Fulton – electric piano
- Joe Johnson – trumpet
- Katrina Nicolayeff – fiddle
- Matthew Patterson – saxophone
- Michael P. Waite – vocals
- Alison Ward – musical saw, vocals
- Guthrie Ward – vocals
- Ruben Ward – vocals
- Travis Ward – vocals

=== Production ===
- Eilen Jewell – producer
- Jason Beek – producer
- Steve Fulton – engineering, mixing
- Pat Storey – engineering
- Jim DeMain – mastering
- Meghan Dewar – design
