= The Art of Virtue =

Studio album by Adrienne Young and Little Sadie
- Released: June 28, 2005
- Recorded: February and March, 2005 at The House of David in Nashville, Tennessee
- Genre: Americana, Country, Folk
- Length: 58:23
- Label: AddieBelle
- Producer: Adrienne Young with Will Kimbrough and Gary Paczosa

Adrienne Young and Little Sadie chronology
Plow to the End of the Row (2004)	The Art of Virtue (2005)	Room to Grow (2007)

Professional ratings
Review scores
Source	Rating
Bluegrass Works	(not rated)
Glide Magazine	(not rated)
Hybrid Magazine	(not rated)

The Art of Virtue is the second CD by Nashville, Tennessee-based singer/songwriter Adrienne Young and her band, Little Sadie.

Young, a history buff, was inspired by Benjamin Franklin’s "Thirteen Virtues," a copy of which was included with the CD, and distressed by the Republican Party’s efforts to leverage “moral virtues” during the 2004 presidential election. The anthemic title track, composed with Will Kimbrough, served as a mission statement of sorts for Young, both personally and professionally, and Franklin's influence is apparent right from the opening lines: "Gonna start a revolution / made of action, not of words / Practicing the art of virtue / A Joyride on the learning curve."

Based in part on the positive response to her 2004 debut release, Plow to the End of the Row, Young was able to attract many of Nashville’s top session players including members of The Del McCoury Band to play on the CD. The result was a noticeably more polished and professional sound that Young and her band, Little Sadie, would hone live in extensive touring throughout the latter half of the year. With the new incarnation of Little Sadie (fiddler and banjoist Eric Merrill, guitarist Hans Holzen, bassist Kyle Kegerreis and percussionist Eric Platz), Young appeared at many major music festivals including the New Jersey Folk Festival, the Greyfox Bluegrass Festival, and the second annual Dead on the Creek Festival, held in Willits, California to honor Grateful Dead singer and guitarist Jerry Garcia.

Alongside the original songs and traditional tunes, The Art of Virtue featured a cover of the Grateful Dead's "Brokedown Palace". Young's AddieBelle label struck a distribution deal with Ryko Records which insured that her music got placed in more record stores. Young used the release of the CD and subsequent concert tour to call attention to her involvement with the Food Routes Network, a non-profit organization that promotes sustainable agriculture and connects consumers with local farmers who are willing to sell direct.

The Art of Virtue placed third in Amazon.com's list of the best folk recordings of the year and was placed on numerous year-end best-of lists including the Americana Music Association, Boston Herald, Cape Cod Times, and Nashville Scene. Appropriately, Young was invited to sing in Philadelphia on January 17, 2006, as part of Benjamin Franklin's 300th birthday celebration.

== Track listing ==
1. "Art of Virtue" (Adrienne Young / Will Kimbrough) – 3:06
2. "Bonaparte's Retreat / My Love Is In America" (Traditional) – 2:21
3. "Hills & Hollers" (Adrienne Young / Mark D. Sanders) – 4:28
4. "Jump the Broom" (Adrienne Young / Will Kimbrough) – 3:37
5. "My Sin Is Pride" (Will Kimbrough / Tom Littlefield) – 2:50
6. "My Love Will Keep" (Adrienne Young / Mark D. Sanders) – 4:18
7. "Ella Arkansas" (Adrienne Young) – 5:36
8. "Rastus Russell" (Adrienne Young / Mark D. Sanders) – 4:12
9. "Wedding Ring" (Adrienne Young / Mark D. Sanders) – 3:16
10. "Don't Get Weary" (Uncle Dave Macon) – 2:25
11. "Golden Ticket" (Eric Merrill) – 2:24
12. "Walls of Jericho" (Adrienne Young) – 5:26
13. "It's All the Same" (Adrienne Young / Will Kimbrough) – 4:48
14. "Farther Along / Bill In The Low Ground" (Traditional) – 4:09
15. "Brokedown Palace" (Jerry Garcia / Robert Hunter) – 5:22

"The Art of Virtue"
from The Art of Virtue (2005)

"Ella Arkansas"
from The Art of Virtue (2005)

== Personnel ==
- Adrienne Young - vocals, banjo, guitar
- Will Kimbrough - guitar, vocals, banjo, resonator guitar
- Alan Bartram – bass
- David Briggs – organ
- Mike Bub – bass
- Clayton Campbell – fiddle
- Jesse Cobb – mandolin
- Flynn Cohen – guitar
- John Deaderick – piano
- Steve Ebe – drums
- Chris Eldridge – guitar
- Chris Fandolfee – banjo
- Jeremy Garrett – fiddle, vocals
- Tyler Grant – guitar
- Meagan Gregory – fiddle
- Andy Hall – dobro, vocals
- Dave Jacques – bass
- Derek Jones – bass
- Fats Kaplan – pedal steel guitar, accordion
- Rob McCoury – banjo
- Eric Merrill – fiddle
- Mark D. Sanders – vocals
- Steven Sandifer – drums & percussion, vocals
- Tim Stafford – guitar
- Rob Trucks – vocals
