= Sea of Tears =

Studio album by Eilen Jewell
- Released: April 21, 2009
- Studio: Middleville Studio
- Genres: Country, Americana, Rock
- Length: 38:49
- Label: Signature Sounds
- Producer: Eilen Jewell Band

Eilen Jewell chronology
| Heartache Boulevard (2008) | Sea of Tears (2009) | Butcher Holler: A Tribute to Loretta Lynn (2010) |

Sea of Tears is the third studio album by singer-songwriter Eilen Jewell and her band. The album was released on April 21, 2009, on the Signature Sounds label with recording and mixing by Chris Rival at Middleville Studio in North Reading, Massachusetts. Reviewers welcomed the addition of rock influences from the early British Invasion to the band's primarily country sound.

== Background ==
Jewell established herself and her band as Boston area fixtures in the local Americana music scene after the former busker teamed up to play local clubs with drummer Jason Beek, guitarist Jerry Miller, and upright bassist John Sciascia in 2005 and then released two highly acclaimed albums. Boundary County was self-released in 2006, and impressed the owner of the Signature Sounds label enough that he approached the band with a recording contract at one of their shows. The resulting followup album, 2007's Letters from Sinners & Strangers, was widely praised and gained Jewell national attention, with the band soon opening for touring acts such as Steve Forbert and Loretta Lynn, giving them a wider audience in anticipation of the 2009 release of Sea of Tears.

== Reception ==
The presence of two cover songs on Sea of Tears raised the interest of several reviewers, because they represented a shift from the Americana styles of Jewell's previously successful releases:

"Shakin' All Over" was originally a 1960 number one hit in the United Kingdom for Johnny Kidd & The Pirates, topped the Canadian charts in 1965 in a version by The Guess Who, and was featured in live performances by The Who at Woodstock and on their 1970 album Live at Leeds. Reviewers compared the song with Jewell's slower country work with phrases such as "bristles with energy" and "tense and moody". Nick Coleman raved about the gender implications of the cover version in The Independent, saying "she doesn't shake so much as tremor delicately – that doesn't mean she ain't entitled. Rock'n'roll can afford a little feminisation, and when it's done with this much sensibility it should sodding well rejoice."

"I'm Gonna Dress In Black" was recorded in 1965 by Them. In reviews, Jewell's 2009 cover version is likened to The Animals' version of "The House of the Rising Sun". Robert Price of the New Jersey Herald agreed and called Sea of Tears "downright raucous by Jewell's standards", pointing to sounds borrowed from the early Beatles on the title track and licks from the Rolling Stones on "Fading Memory" as rounding out the rock and roll influences that make an album that "rises to a whole new level" over Jewell's previous releases.

The album did disappoint some reviewers. Ben Child of PopMatters saw Jewell failing to effectively convey her message without falling into clichéd lyrics, writing that her "images strain towards an effect – 'authenticity', perhaps — that remains elusive. Effect is traded for affect and, since the language lacks ballast, it too quickly loses its texture." Jerome Clark found Sea of Tears more ordinary than he expected, if only because he thought of Letters from Sinners & Strangers as "an extraordinarily good album". Both of those reviewers were nevertheless impressed by an additional cover, that of Loretta Lynn's "The Darkest Day", with Child seeing it as "beautifully reimagined", with "guitar lines that straddle the Bakersfield snap of Don Rich and the funky Memphis grime of Steve Cropper."

== Track listing ==
All songs by Eilen Jewell, except where noted.

1. "Rain Roll In" - 2:47
2. "Sweet Rose" - 3:10
3. "Shakin' All Over" (Johnny Kidd) - 3:04
4. "Sea Of Tears" - 2:46
5. "Fading Memory" - 3:43
6. "Nowhere In No Time" - 3:11
7. "I'm Gonna Dress In Black" (M. Gillon, M. Howe) - 4:03
8. "One Of Those Days" - 3:57
9. "Final Hour" - 3:01
10. "The Darkest Day" (Loretta Lynn) - 2:32
11. "Everywhere I Go" - 2:57
12. "Codeine Arms" - 3:38

== Personnel ==
as listed in the CD digipak

=== Musicians ===
- Eilen Jewell - vocals, acoustic guitar, organ
- Jason Beek - drums, percussion, vocals
- Jerry Miller - six and twelve-string electric guitars, acoustic guitar, non-pedal steel
- John Sciascia - upright bass, six-string electric bass

=== Production ===
- Chris Rival - recording, mixing
- Johnny Sciascia - mastering
- Oat Creative - artwork
- Jennifer Lucey-Brzoza - photography
