= Amy Black =

Amy Black may refer to:

- Amy Black (mezzo-soprano) (1973–2009), British opera singer
- Amy Black (American singer) (born 1972), American singer-songwriter
