= Buffet Hotel =

Studio album by Jimmy Buffett
- Released: December 8, 2009
- Genre: Country rock
- Length: 53:51
- Label: Mailboat
- Producer: Mac McAnally; Michael Utley

Jimmy Buffett chronology
Take the Weather with You (2006)	Buffet Hotel (2009)	Songs from St. Somewhere (2013)

Professional ratings
Review scores
Source	Rating
Allmusic	(favorable)

Buffet Hotel is the twenty-seventh studio album by American singer-songwriter Jimmy Buffett, released on December 8, 2009. On October 27, 2009, it was officially posted on the Margaritaville homepage as well on the Mailboat Records homepage. It is the follow-up to Take the Weather with You (2006).

While making the album, Buffett employed techniques from earlier albums, such as recording later at night after surfing; this resulted in a more laid-back feel. The name of the album comes from a building in Bamako, Mali, which Buffett visited during the Festival au Désert.

== Track listing ==
Track list
No.	Title	Writer(s)	Length
1.	"Nobody from Nowhere"	Will Kimbrough, Tommy Womack	5:07
2.	"Wings"	Jimmy Buffett, Will Kimbrough	3:46
3.	"Big Top"	Jimmy Buffett, Roger Guth	4:31
4.	"Beautiful Swimmers"	Jimmy Buffett	5:21
5.	"Turn Up the Heat and Chill the Rosé"	Jimmy Buffett	3:50
6.	"Summerzcool"	Jimmy Buffett, Mac McAnally	3:15
7.	"Rhumba Man"	Jesse Winchester	4:10
8.	"We Learned to Be Cool from You"	Jimmy Buffett	5:55
9.	"Surfing in a Hurricane"	Jimmy Buffett, Will Kimbrough	4:26
10.	"Life Short Call Now"	Bruce Cockburn	4:08
11.	"Buffet Hotel"	Jimmy Buffett, Bill Flanagan, Mac McAnally	6:00
12.	"A Lot to Drink About"	Jimmy Buffett, Will Kimbrough, Mac McAnally	3:29

== Chart performance ==
=== Weekly charts ===
Chart (2009)	Peak position
US Billboard 200	17
US Independent Albums (Billboard)	1
US Top Rock Albums (Billboard)	2

=== Year-end charts ===
Chart (2010)	Position
US Billboard 200	173
US Top Rock Albums (Billboard)	49
