= Boundary County (album) =

Studio album by Eilen Jewell
- Released: April 4, 2006
- Recorded: December 14 & 15, 2005
- Studio: Middleville Studio (North Andover, Massachusetts)
- Genres: Americana, Country, Singer-songwriter
- Length: 46:19
- Label: Self-released
- Producers: Jason Beek, Eilen Jewell, Chad Crumm

Eilen Jewell chronology
Boundary County (2006)	Letters from Sinners & Strangers (2007)

Boundary County is the debut studio album by American singer-songwriter Eilen Jewell. It was self-released in early 2006, and was primarily produced by drummer Jason Beek and Jewell. A collection of thirteen cross-genre Americana and country songs written by Jewell, it impressed critics.

The title of the album refers to the northernmost county of Jewell's native Idaho, named Boundary County as it borders Montana, Washington, and the nation of Canada. The album includes "The Flood", a sonic indictment of the political leaders of the United States following the catastrophic flooding of New Orleans in August 2005 in the wake of Hurricane Katrina.

== Track listing ==
All songs by Eilen Jewell.

1. "Boundary County" - 3:46
2. "Till You Lay Down Your Heavy Load" - 3:16
3. "Hey Hey Hey" - 3:13
4. "Fourth Degree" - 4:04
5. "Mess Around" - 4:24
6. "Back To Dallas" - 3:19
7. "No Place To Go" - 3:43
8. "So Long Blues" - 3:40
9. "Gotta Get Right" - 2:38
10. "The Flood" - 4:31
11. "Blow It All Away" - 5:55
12. "Someone's Arms" - 3:50
13. "You Can't Take My Song Away" - 2:15

== Personnel ==
Credits adapted from the album's liner notes.

=== Musicians ===
- Jason Beek – drums, percussion, vocals
- Greg Glassman – banjo, vocals
- Eilen Jewell – guitar, harmonica, electric piano, vocals
- Daniel Kellar – violin
- Jerry Miller – electric guitar, mandolin, acoustic guitar, lap steel, dobro
- Johnny Sciascia – upright bass

=== Production ===
- Eilen Jewell – producer, photography
- Jason Beek – producer, photography
- Chad Crumm – producer (4, 8)
- Chris Rival – engineering, mixing, mastering
- Erin Caruso – photography
- Angelynn Grant – design
