= Plow to the End of the Row =

Studio album by Adrienne Young and Little Sadie
- Released: April 13, 2004
- Recorded: 2003 and 2004 in Nashville, Tennessee
- Genres: Americana, Bluegrass, country, folk
- Length: 48:54
- Label: AddieBelle
- Producers: Adrienne Young and Will Kimbrough

Adrienne Young and Little Sadie chronology
Plow to the End of the Row (2004)	The Art of Virtue (2005)

Professional ratings
Review scores
Source	Rating
Allmusic	link
Paste Magazine	link
WXPN	link

Plow to the End of the Row is the 2004 debut album by Nashville, Tennessee-based singer/songwriter Adrienne Young and her band, Little Sadie.

== Overview ==
After attending Belmont University in Nashville, Young worked for two years in various jobs on Music Row. "No one was interested in my music", she says. "I was working in the music business offices, and everyone around me was doing what they wanted to do. It was driving me crazy because I knew I could do it, but you can't save up the money to do a record when you're making seven or eight bucks an hour". Young was also determined to retain ownership of the rights to her songs and recordings, something that runs counter to the way the music industry typically works. In an e-mail to friend and philanthropist Wallace Rasmussen, Young confessed her frustration and admitted that she was thinking of returning to her home state of Florida. Rasmussen responded, "Do you really want to do music? Then you've got to plow to the end of the row".

Rasmussen fronted her the money to record and release Plow to the End of the Row on her own AddieBelle record label. An early version of the disc, released on a limited basis in 2003, featured several tracks that were ultimately dropped or re-recorded for the national release in 2004. That first configuration included backing from the old-time music band Old Crow Medicine Show. The second version was intended to feature Young's own band, Little Sadie, more prominently.

The packaging, designed by Jami Anderson (http://www.jamidesign.com) mimicked the style of the Farmers' Almanac and included a packet of wildflower seeds. It was nominated for a Grammy award for Best Recording Package. There were slight changes to the packaging for the 2004 version, most notably a photo of Young alone was replaced with a shot of her with the whole band. The 2004 Just Plain Folks Music Awards named Plow to the End of the Row Roots Album of the Year, and the track "I Cannot Justify" Best Roots Songs of the Year.

The music on the disc is intended to reflect the place of traditional values in a modern world. Both traditional and modern instruments are used in songs to exemplify the unique qualities typical of folk music: simple, direct lyrics and infectious melodies. Young's original songs are seamlessly interspersed with traditional songs. Her ballad "Conestoga" evokes the sound of America's western migration era, followed by the very modern electric guitar-and-bass production style of the breakup song "Poison". A few tracks later, the traditional "Soldier's Joy" itself evokes Gid Tanner and the Skillet Lickers.

The title track depicts a day in the life of a typical farmer in a series of verses that neither romanticize nor bemoan an existence that most Americans no longer understand. The toil of "rocks in my shoes, dirt in my eyes, working like a dog 'til the day I die", is balanced by the knowledge that "My baby's waitin, for me at the end of the day", and each verse ends with the inescapable reminder that one must indeed "plow to the end of the row".

A video for "Home Remedy" featured that song's co-writer, Will Kimbrough, and received airplay on CMT. The track was named Best Country Song of the Year by the Nashville Scene.

As noted by the press, Young also gave voice to the contradictory feelings that many Americans had about the war in Iraq with her song "Blinded by Stars." It begins with a reverential remembrance of the heroes of past wars and then points out that "This was their flag but this ain’t their fight." Then following a warning not to "let the town crier decide if we go to war," she takes that sentiment to a contemporary and personal level by changing the refrain to "This is my flag, but this ain’t my fight."

Young and her band performed at the Philadelphia Folk Festival, Live Oak Music Festival, Boston Folk Festival, Rhythm & Roots Festival, and toured extensively in the United States and England to promote the album. It garnered positive reviews from numerous folk and roots music publications as well as mainstream newspapers and magazines.

== Track listing (2004 release) ==
1. "Plow to the End of the Row" (Adrienne Young/Will Kimbrough) – 3:16
2. "Leather Britches" (traditional) – 2:39
3. "Home Remedy" (Adrienne Young/Will Kimbrough) – 3:41
4. "Sadie's Song" (Adrienne Young/Mark D. Sanders) – 3:59
5. "Nippers' Corner" (Adrienne Young/Courtney Little) – 4:23
6. "I Cannot Justify" (Adrienne Young/Will Kimbrough) – 3:26
7. "Conestoga" (Adrienne Young) – 4:16
8. "Poison" (Adrienne Young) – 4:42
9. "Her Eyes Were Watching God" (Adrienne Young/Carter Wood) – 3:40
10. "Blinded by Stars" (Adrienne Young/Alice Randall) – 4:01
11. "Soldier's Joy" (traditional) – 2:33
12. "Marching Jaybird" (traditional) – 1:56
13. "Lonesome Road Blues" (traditional) – 4:04
14. "Satan, Yer Kingdom Must Come Down" (traditional) – 2:18

== Music Samples ==
"Sadie's Song"
from Plow to the End of the Row (2004)

"I Cannot Justify"
from Plow to the End of the Row (2004)

== Track listing for original 2003 version ==
1. "I Cannot Justify" (Adrienne Young/Will Kimbrough) – 3:26
2. "Satan, Yer Kingdom Must Come Down" (traditional) – 1:29
3. "Home Remedy" (Adrienne Young/Will Kimbrough) – 3:41
4. "Plow to the End of the Row" (Adrienne Young/Will Kimbrough) – 3:16
5. "Sadie's Song" - alternate version (Adrienne Young/Mark D. Sanders) – 4:13
6. "Groundhog" (traditional) – 2:01
7. "Cluck Old Hen" (traditional) – 2:22
8. "Nippers' Corner" (Adrienne Young/Courtney Little) – 4:25
9. "Conestoga" (Adrienne Young) – 4:19
10. "Lonesome Road Blues" - alternative version (traditional) – 4:38
11. "Poison" (Adrienne Young) – 4:43
12. "Her Eyes Were Watching God" (Adrienne Young/Carter Wood) – 3:42
13. "Blinded by Stars" (Adrienne Young/Alice Randall) – 4:00
14. "Soldier's Joy" (traditional) – 2:34
15. "Stripes" (Johnny Cash) – 2:53
16. "Spotted Pony" (traditional) – 2:30
17. "(Very) Little Birdy" (traditional) – 0:14

== Personnel ==
- Adrienne Young — vocals, banjo, guitar
- Will Kimbrough — guitar, vocals, harmonica, resonator guitar, bass
- Clayton Campbell — fiddle
- Dave Roe — upright bass
- Steve Ebe — drums
- Tyler Grant — guitar, vocals
- Paul Griffith — drums
- David Henry — cello
- Dave Jacques — bass
- Amanda Kowalski — upright bass
- Rick Lonow — drums
- Bobby Memphis — bass
- Billy Myers — bass
- Brad Pemberton — drums
- Robin Rucker — banjo
- Steven Sandifer — percussion, vocals
- Todd Schneider — harmonica
- Ketcham Secor — banjo
