= Take the Weather with You =

Studio album by Jimmy Buffett
- Released: October 10, 2006
- Genre: Country
- Length: 59:55
- Label: Mailboat; RCA Nashville
- Producer: Stan Kellam; Mac McAnally; Michael Utley

Jimmy Buffett chronology
License to Chill (2004)	Take the Weather with You (2006)	Buffet Hotel (2009)

Professional ratings
Review scores
Source	Rating
AllMusic	3.5/5 stars

Take the Weather with You is the twenty-sixth studio album by American singer-songwriter Jimmy Buffett. It was released on Mailboat Records on October 10, 2006. It peaked at #1 on Billboard's country charts, also reaching #4 on the Billboard 200. 10 of the 14 songs on the album are covers.

The song "Breathe In, Breathe out, Move On" was written for the victims of Hurricane Katrina. The song "Bama Breeze" was a homage to the beach-front bars that dotted the coast before they were destroyed by Hurricane Katrina, and at the end of the music video a message confirms this fact. The songs "Party at the End of the World" and "Bama Breeze" were tour names in 2006 and 2007, respectively. The album is the first since Christmas Island in which the title track was not written or co-written by Buffett.

== Track listing ==
Track list
No.	Title	Writer(s)	Length
1.	"Bama Breeze"	Mark Irwin, Josh Kear, Chris Tompkins	3:11
2.	"Party at the End of the World"	Buffett, Roger Guth, Will Kimbrough, Peter Mayer	3:45
3.	"Weather with You"	Neil Finn, Tim Finn	3:43
4.	"Everybody's on the Phone"	Buffett, Guth, Kimbrough, Mayer	4:27
5.	"Whoop De Doo"	Mark Knopfler	3:41
6.	"Nothin' But a Breeze"	Jesse Winchester	4:16
7.	"Cinco de Mayo in Memphis"	Guy Clark, Chuck Mead	3:28
8.	"Reggabilly Hill"	Michael Garrett	3:51
9.	"Elvis Presley Blues"	David Rawlings, Gillian Welch	3:24
10.	"Hula Girl at Heart"	Buffett, Guth, Kimbrough, Mayer	3:41
11.	"Wheel Inside the Wheel"	Mary Gauthier	7:01
12.	"Silver Wings"	Merle Haggard	3:43
13.	"Breathe In, Breathe Out, Move On"	Buffett, Matt Betton	3:17
14.	"Duke's on Sunday"	Henry Kapono	4:35
15.	"Here We Are" (Bonus track)	Betton, Buffett	3:50

== Charts ==
=== Weekly charts ===
Chart (2006)	Peak position
US Billboard 200	4
US Top Country Albums (Billboard)	1

=== Year-end charts ===
Chart (2006)	Position
US Top Country Albums (Billboard)	50
Chart (2007)	Position
US Top Country Albums (Billboard)	51
