= Get Behind the Wheel =

Studio album by Eilen Jewell
- Released: May 5, 2023
- Studio: Audio Lab (Garden City, Idaho); Kimbrough Super Service (Nashville)
- Genre: Country, Blues
- Length: 41:27
- Label: Signature Sounds
- Producer: Eilen Jewell, Will Kimbrough

Eilen Jewell chronology
Gypsy (2019)	Get Behind the Wheel (2023)

Get Behind the Wheel is the ninth studio album by American singer-songwriter Eilen Jewell. Produced by Jewell and her band, and Will Kimbrough, and recorded at Audio Lab in Garden City, Idaho and Kimbrough Super Service in Nashville, it was released on May 5, 2023, through Signature Sounds. Reviewers gave the album favorable marks, highlighting Jewell's ability to "innovatively mine blues, country, and folk playbooks", while demonstrating resilience following the breakup of her marriage to bandmate Jason Beek.

== Background ==
In interviews, Jewell has described a highly tumultuous and distressing couple of years following the mid-August 2019 release of her eighth studio album, Gypsy. Her marriage to Jason Beek, her bandmate, drummer, and manager, began to disintegrate as the COVID-19 pandemic began in early 2020. As a result, the songwriter moved out of her house while caring for the couple's young daughter, and then moved again twice. A strong earthquake struck near her home town of Boise. Suffering further loss with the deaths of friends and family members, not COVID related, during the next months, Jewell later admitted to "drinking too much to escape all the stress". Her solution to avoid damaging her career was to retreat to a remote cabin in Idaho to concentrate on writing, to write songs about her personal feelings, outside her usual sketches of anonymous characters that exist within the song. Beek and Jewell maintained their professional relationship, with the drummer playing throughout Get Behind the Wheel and continuing to tour with the band, however prior to the release of the album they were divorced.

== Reception ==
When Jewell retreated to a remote area, she sought out hiking trails to explore. She saw signs pointing to the Crooked River, a tributary of the North Fork Boise River, later saying "something about that name kept calling to me". Several reviewers point to the album's second track "Crooked River" as thematic, with Jewell's singing and songwriting illustrating a reverence for the emotional healing and restoration that nature can provide. Writing for No Depression, John Amen named the song as "one of the standout tracks in Jewell’s considerable oeuvre."

Critics noted Jewell applying her take on cover songs to navigate personal relationship troubles, with John Apice calling a talented and faithful cover of Them's "Could You Would You", written by Van Morrison, "a remarkable time capsule", and Steve Horowitz seeing celebration in the complexities of ending a relationship in a cover of "Breakaway".

Mike Davies enjoyed the "bluesy slink" of "Outsiders", as an homage to the 1967 novel The Outsiders and 1983 film, where Jewell sings of the coming of age story, "Those wild and beautiful things/Turned-up collars and rolled-up jeans/Tracks of tears caked with mud/All mixed up with the orphans’ blood/Those wild and beautiful things/If only someone could see/The gold that lies beneath".

Jewell and members of her band were credited as producers of previous albums, however for Get Behind the Wheel, Jewell worked with Will Kimbrough to "get another set of ears" on her sound. According to Hal Horowitz, Kimbrough's influence was strongest on the album's five-minute-long closer, "The Bitter End", concluding Jewell's "arguably finest" album release. Davies compared the song to "psych noir folk" music by Jefferson Airplane or Buffalo Springfield, and saw it as a "condensation of the album’s themes about confronting the hurt and transforming it into healing".

== Track listing ==
All songs by Eilen Jewell except (6, 7).

1. "Alive" - 4:24
2. "Crooked River" - 3:53
3. "Lethal Love" - 3:06
4. "Come Home Soon" - 2:44
5. "Winnemucca" - 4:17
6. "Could You Would You" (Van Morrison) - 3:16
7. "Breakaway" (Jackie DeShannon, Shari K. Sheeley) - 3:37
8. "You Were a Friend of Mine" - 3:38
9. "Outsiders" - 3:50
10. "Silver Wheels and Wings" - 3:19
11. "The Bitter End" - 5:23

== Personnel ==
Credits adapted from the album's liner notes.

=== Musicians ===
- Jason Beek – drums, vocals (2, 5–7), percussion (3)
- Steve Fulton – wurlitzer (4), vocals (5, 7), organ (6)
- Eilen Jewell – vocals, harmonica (2); acoustic guitar (5, 8, 10, 11), organ (11)
- Fats Kaplin – pedal steel (2, 5, 10)
- Will Kimbrough – electric guitar (1, 6), acoustic guitar (2, 10), mandolin (10), keyboard (1, 3, 7, 9, 11), percussion (1, 4–7, 11); vocals (7), baritone guitar (7, 9)
- Jerry Miller – electric guitar
- Matt Murphy – upright bass

=== Production ===
- Eilen Jewell – producer
- Eilen Jewell Band – producer
- Will Kimbrough – producer
- Steve Fulton – engineering
- Justin Pizzoferrato – mixing
- Jim DeMain – mastering
- Beth Herzhaft – photography
- Meghan Dewar – design
