= Amy Black (American singer) =

American singer-songwriter

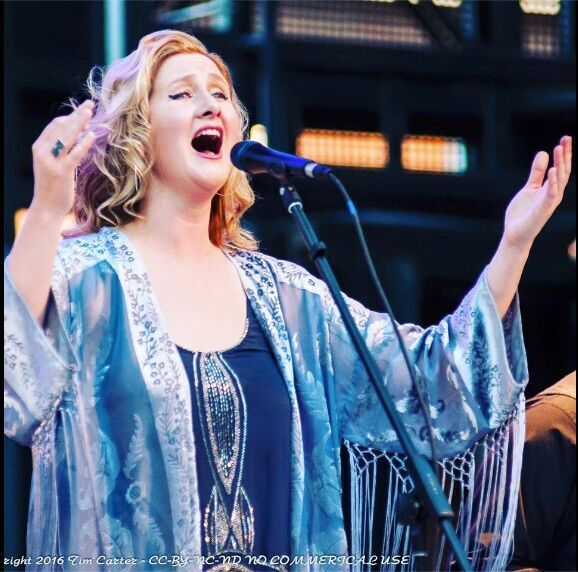
- At the Lowell Music Series in Lowell, MA, June 2016 opening for Patty Griffin.

Background information
- Birth name: Amy Elizabeth Jones
- Born: January 18, 1972 (age 53); Springfield, Missouri, U.S.
- Genres: Roots/Blues/Soul
- Instrument: Vocals
- Years active: 2008–Present
- Website: www.amyblack.com

Amy Black is a singer/songwriter and performer who started her music career in Boston, Massachusetts and now lives in Nashville, Tennessee.

== Early life ==
The daughter of a minister, Black spent her early years in Missouri and Alabama before relocating with her family to Boston, Massachusetts. She studied at Northeastern University. During her college years she pursued singing as a pastime, forming several bands. After receiving her degree, Black pursued a career in marketing.

== Musical career (2008–present) ==
In 2008, Black began singing publicly at open mic nights in the Boston area. She formed the band Amy Black and the Red Clay Rascals, an acoustic roots music ensemble, and began to play at Boston area venues. The group released their self-titled debut album in 2009 which primarily included classic covers by country legends including Johnny Cash, Emmylou Harris, and John Prine.

Black reformed the band in 2010, adding electric guitar and dropping the “Red Clay Rascals” moniker to perform as "Amy Black."

In late 2010, Black collaborated with producer Lorne Entress on her first solo album, One Time. Released in March 2011, the album features nine of Black's original songs and three cover songs. Nashville-based bluegrass player Stuart Duncan played fiddle and mandolin on the album.

In March, 2013, Black released her first live album Amy Black Live at Johnny D's.

In February 2014, Black released her second album of mostly originals, This is Home produced by Lex Price and featuring guitar playing by Will Kimbrough and Oliver Wood of the Wood Brothers.

In June 2015 Black released The Muscle Shoals Sessions, produced by Lex Price and recorded at FAME Studios in Muscle Shoals, Alabama, the area where both of her parents were born and raised. The album features Rock and Roll Hall of Fame sideman, Spooner Oldham on keyboard and Regina and Ann McCrary of the McCrary Sisters on background vocals. The album consists of primarily classic covers originally recorded in Muscle Shoals, and three of Black's originals.

In 2015, Black relocated to Nashville, Tennessee from Boston, Massachusetts as positive critical reviews in national publications, and an extensive touring schedule, helped her career gain momentum on a national level.

In January 2017, Black recorded an album of original soul music and several classics in Memphis, Tennessee with grammy-nominated producer, Scott Bomar (also the leader of the Memphis-based band, The Bo-Keys.) Players on the album included Hi Rhythm Section, the Rev. Charles Hodges, Leroy "Flick" Hodges, and Howard Grimes, along with guitarist Bobby Manuel. The album, titled MEMPHIS was released on June 2, 2017. It featured the single, "The Blackest Cloud".

Black plays primarily on the East Coast of the United States, and the Southern United States, and The Midwest of the United States.

Black has opened shows for artists including The Mavericks, Delbert McClinton, Patti Griffin, Chris Isaak, James McMurtry, The Court Yard Hounds, Rodney Crowell, Suzy Bogguss, Joe Ely, Eilen Jewell, Lori McKenna, Emmylou Harris, John Hammond, Charlie Musselwhite, and Kelly Willis.

In December 2018, Black's original song, "Without You", was included on the soundtrack of the Clint Eastwood film, The Mule.

On March 13, Black released the single "I Have a Choice," featuring The Blind Boys of Alabama.

== Critical reception ==
One Time received local and national reviews. Boston Herald music critic Nate Dow wrote, “it is the beautifully imagined sound and soul of her originals that make her a newcomer of note.” Country news site Roughstock noted "Amy Black is something uncommon in the contemporary era. She combines strong, female centered songs with a solid sense of contemporary country that never gives way to pop sensibilities." Americana and roots music magazine No Depression observed of her live performances, "Black has a rich voice layered with a light, natural vibrato. It’s a smooth, seductive sound and one that easily commands attention."

Reviews of Black's second album, This Is Home, were positive. The Philadelphia Inquirer called Black "an appealing cross between Bonnie Raitt and Mary Chapin Carpenter." The Boston Globe stated that it "coaxes a sultry confidence from Black. She slays you by being sly...This Is Home is an effortless blend of roots, country, and blues – with a touch of R&B-and further establishes Black's songwriting abilities." American Songwriter Magazine gave the album 4 out of 5 stars, writing "one listen and you'll be convinced that she's powerful, authentic, and above all a soulful new entry in the rootsy singer/songwriter ranks and with any luck this should be the album that introduces her to a wider audience."

The Muscle Shoals Sessions, Black's third full-length album released in June 2015, also garnered a positive critical reception, with The Boston Globe choosing it as a "best local album of 2015", writing that it "showcases Black's range as a skillful interpreter." Elmore Magazine stated: "to showcase her true potential as a bluesy, R&B hitter, Amy Black had to go home.... Black's soulful chops shine." Blues in Britain magazine also praised Black's "deeply soulful voice that melds elements of Dusty Springfield, Mavis Staples, and Alberta Hunter."

Black's fourth full-length studio album, Memphis, received positive reception with the Chicago Tribune writing, Black's new record is 'Memphis,' a soulful and swinging collection of seven originals plus three covers of songs by legendary artists Otis Clay, Bobby "Blue" Bland and Ruby Johnson. Released on her own label Reuben Records, the aptly titled album shines a light on Black's love for the iconic city that has been home to some of the greatest blues, soul, country and rock 'n' roll ever produced. American Blues Scene wrote "The closer Amy Black gets to 'home base,' the better her music becomes. Memphis is for lovers of the old school, soul sound. It’s for a younger generation too, so they can hear for themselves, what all the hubbub has been about for 50+ years. Trust us when we say you want this one in your collection."

== Discography ==
- Amy Black and the Red Clay Rascals (2009)
- One Time (2011)
- Amy Black Live at Johnny D's (2013)
- The Muscle Shoals Session (EP) (2013)
- This Is Home (2014)
- The Muscle Shoals Sessions (2015)
- Memphis (2017)
- I Have a Choice Single (2020)
