= Live at The Narrows =

Live album by Eilen Jewell
- Released: November 11, 2014
- Studio: Middleville Studios
- Genre: Country
- Length: 106:23
- Label: Self-released
- Producer: Eilen Jewell band

Eilen Jewell chronology
Queen of the Minor Key (2011)	Live at The Narrows (2014)	Sundown Over Ghost Town (2015)

Live at The Narrows is a live album by American singer-songwriter Eilen Jewell. Recorded live at Narrows Center for the Arts in Fall River, Massachusetts on February 14th–15th, 2014, the album was mixed by Chris Rival at Middleville Studios in North Reading and self-released by Jewell.

== Reception ==
A decade after moving to the Boston area, Jewell and her band had released five studio albums and toured extensively. Live at The Narrows captures the band in a two-CD collection recorded at the 430-seat Fall River performance center. The album cover is a depiction of the band hand-drawn by bassist Johnny Sciascia. Impressed by the "delicate but muscular framework" provided by Jewell's "never ostentatious" band, in a review of the live set, the Idaho Statesman described guitarist Jerry Miller as "tastefully flashy at all the right moments".

== Track listing ==
All songs written by Eilen Jewell except where noted.

=== Disc One ===
1. "Where They Never Say Your Name" - 3:28
2. "Sea Of Tears" - 2:28
3. "Bang Bang Bang" - 2:29
4. "Dusty Boxcar Wall" (Eric Andersen) - 3:55
5. "Reckless" - 2:05
6. "Too Hot To Sleep" - 2:18
7. "Rich Man's World" - 3:42
8. "Mess Around" - 4:06
9. "Santa Fe" - 5:11
10. "Rio Grande" - 3:47
11. "Rain Roll In" - 2:37
12. "High Shelf Booze" - 4:18
13. "In The End" - 4:15
14. "Warning Signs" - 2:32

=== Disc Two ===
1. "I Remember You" - 4:54
2. "Heartache Boulevard" - 2:45
3. "Back To Dallas" - 3:29
4. "Why I'm Walkin'" (Melvin Endsley, Stonewall Jackson) - 2:48
5. "Sweet Rose" - 3:14
6. "Blue Highway" - 2:36
7. "Drop Down Daddy" (Lucinda Williams, Sleepy John Estes) - 3:28
8. "Boundary County" - 3:47
9. "Everywhere I Go" - 3:18
10. "Fading Memory" - 3:22
11. "Head Over Heels" (Lester Flatt) - 3:05
12. "The Flood" - 5:08
13. "Thanks a Lot" (Charlie Rich) - 3:02
14. "If You Catch Me Stealing" (Traditional, arr. Eilen Jewell) - 5:24
15. "Shakin' All Over" (Johnny Kidd) - 8:52

== Personnel ==
Credits adapted from the album's liner notes.

=== Musicians ===
- Eilen Jewell – vocals, acoustic guitar, harmonica, percussion
- Jason Beek – drums, vocals
- Jerry Miller – electric guitar
- Johnny Sciascia – upright bass

=== Production ===
- Chris Rival – mixing
- John Mailloux – engineering
- Johnny Sciascia – mastering, artwork, design
