= Bis-Quits =

- Origin: Nashville, Tennessee
- Genres: Roots rock
- Label: Oh Boy Records
- Members: Will Kimbrough, Tommy Womack, Mike Grimes, Tommy Meyer

The Bis-Quits were a roots rock band from Nashville, Tennessee, active in the 1990s. Its members were Will Kimbrough, Tommy Womack, Mike "Grimey" Grimes (bass guitar) and Tommy Meyer (drums).

Womack has described the band's style as "kinda like NRBQ meets the Replacements." The Washington Post had previously drawn the NRBQ comparison in 1993.

The band released only one album, The Bis-Quits, on Oh Boy Records in 1993. It received a four-star (out of five) rating from AllMusic and a B+ from Entertainment Weekly. It was particularly noted for its song "Yo Yo Ma", which was described by No Depression as "a Chuck Berry-by-way-of-Dan Baird rocker".

The Washington Post called the songs "loose and funny" and deemed the album "often clever and catchy." It also singled out Kimbrough's pop sense and the melodies of the best songs. However, the lyrics came in for criticism.

Nonetheless, the group and its work enjoyed lasting recognition:

- In 2004, a feature in Cincinnati City Beat about Kimbrough referred to the Bis-quits as an "indie cult" band and their album as "much beloved."
- In 2021, as part of its 40th anniversary celebration, Oh Boy Records highlighted a different artist or album from its roster on a weekly basis. First up: the Bis-Quits, who were the subject of a short documentary. The Bis-Quits album was also reissued, becoming available for the first time on vinyl.
