= Adrienne Young =

American singer-songwriter

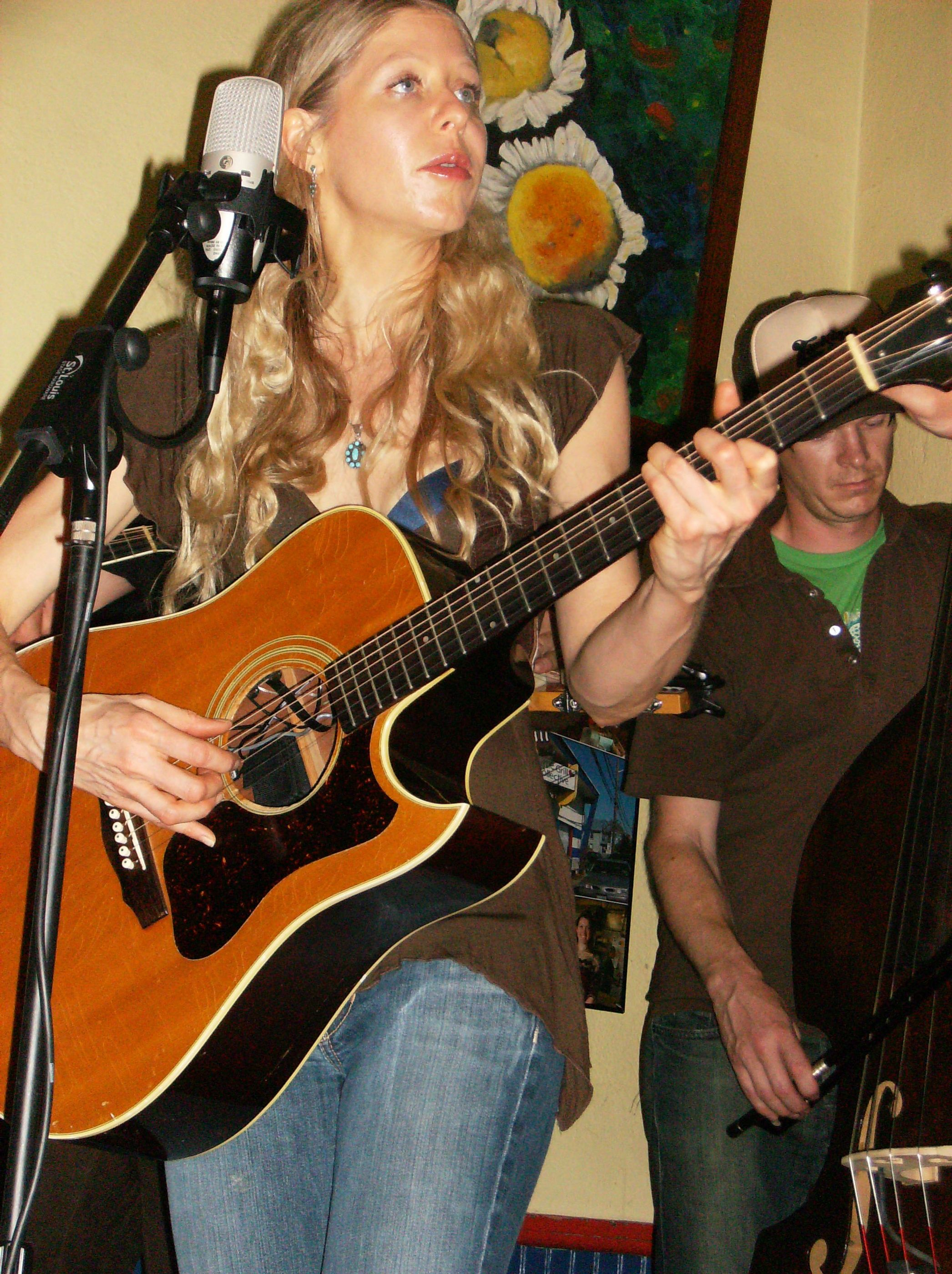
- Little Grill Collective, June 27, 2008 "Buy Fresh, Buy Local" benefit

Background information
- Origin: Tallahassee, Florida, United States
- Genres: Bluegrass, country, old-time music, American folk music
- Instruments: Vocals, acoustic guitar, clawhammer banjo
- Member of: Little Sadie
- Website: Official Website

Adrienne Adeana Young is an American singer, songwriter, and multi-instrumentalist. She is founder and operator of AddieBelle Music which produces her recordings.

Her music, created with various incarnations of her band Little Sadie, blends elements of bluegrass, country, old-time, and American folk, and pop music.

== Life and early career ==
She is from Tallahassee, Florida and is a seventh-generation Floridian. Young grew up in a musical family in Clearwater, where she was a member of the band Big White Undies.

She was graduated from Belmont University in Nashville with a music business and Spanish degree. After working several clerical jobs along Music Row, she started her own record label, Addiebelle Music. The label takes its name from a nickname Young was given while working as a tour guide at Nashville's Belle Meade Plantation. She also formed the short-lived band Liters of Pop with Eric McConnell.

She learned to play clawhammer-style banjo from Ketch Secor of Old Crow Medicine Show, and started amassing a catalog of old-time tunes.

Young began gaining attention with her 2003 win in the Chris Austin songwriting contest at MerleFest for "Sadie's Song". Co-written with Mark D. Sanders, the song is a re-telling of the murderous bluegrass standard "Little Sadie" told from the victim's point of view.

== Recordings ==
Her band Little Sadie featured on her first CD, Plow to the End of the Row, produced with Will Kimbrough, and released on her own AddieBelle record label. The CD, which includes a packet of wildflower seeds along with artwork based on the Farmers' Almanac, was nominated for a Grammy Award for Best Album Package. An early version of Plow to the End of the Row, released in 2003, included several tracks with Young backed by Old Crow Medicine Show and was a top pick for 2003 Debut Artist by the Freeform American Roots DJ Chart. The nationally-released version, featuring different sequencing, new tracks, and re-recorded versions of several songs, was released on April 13, 2004.

The Americana Music Association included Young and her band in their nominees for Emerging Artist of the Year, and the Nashville Scene named "Home Remedy" as Best Country Single of the year. Plow to the End of the Row placed on several "best of" lists for the year and the Los Angeles Times called Young "the Americana music find of the year."

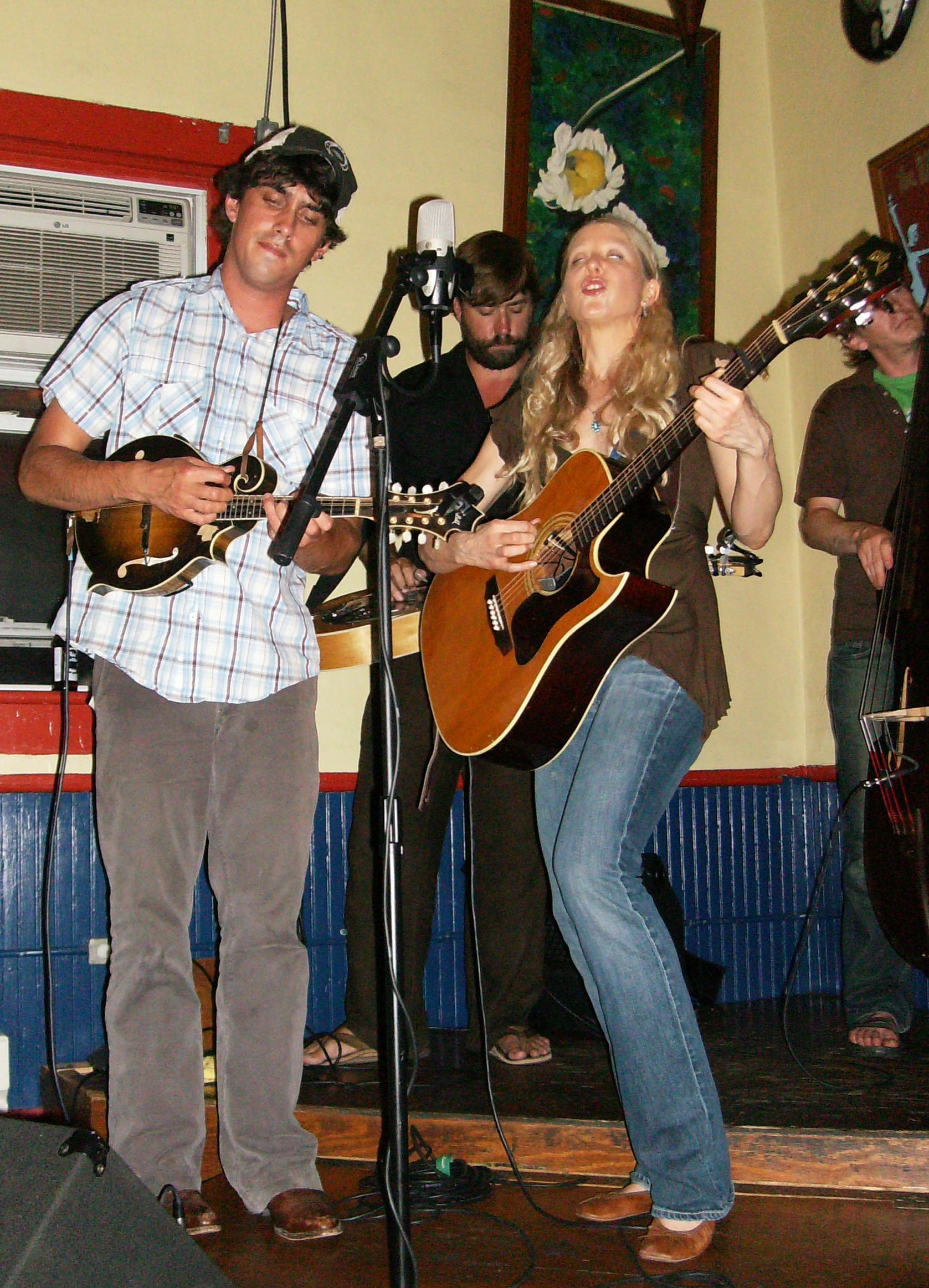
Young with Andy Thacker of Little Sadie, Little Grill Collective, June 27, 2008.

Young and her band Little Sadie (at the time, Tyler Grant on guitar, Clayton Campbell on fiddle and mandolin, Amanda Kowalski on bass, and Steven Sandifer on percussion) toured extensively across the U.S. and in England. The members of the band left to pursue other projects prior to the recording of Young's second CD, The Art of Virtue.

That disc, released on June 28, 2005, took its theme from Benjamin Franklin's Thirteen Virtues. A copy of Franklin's pamphlet is included with the CD. Will Kimbrough co-produced the CD and co-wrote several tracks. Alongside original songs and traditional tunes, the disc features a cover of the Grateful Dead song "Brokedown Palace".

Young's AddieBelle label struck a distribution deal with Ryko Records. She also continued to receive support from public radio and was invited to appear on World Cafe, Mountain Stage, and A Prairie Home Companion. With a new incarnation of Little Sadie (fiddler and banjoist Eric Merrill, guitarist Hans Holzen, bassist Kyle Kegerreis, and percussionist Eric Platz), Young toured extensively in 2005.

The Art of Virtue placed third in Amazon.com's list of the best folk recordings of the year. Young was invited to sing in Philadelphia on January 17, 2006, as part of Benjamin Franklin's 300th birthday celebration.

In May 2006, Young took her band to Levon Helm's studio in Woodstock, New York, to record tracks for a third album, titled Room to Grow, which was released May 22, 2007.

== Activism ==
Plow to the End of the Row, her 2004 debut CD, came with a packet of seeds enclosed and was nominated for the Grammy Award for Best Recording Package.

Young's second CD, The Art of Virtue released in 2005, took its theme from Benjamin Franklin's Thirteen Virtues and included a copy of Franklin's pamphlet inside. The title track addressed issues that Young was considering after the 2004 re-election of George W. Bush, specifically how the Republican Party had leveraged the theme of morality as a campaign tool. As she said at the time:

There seems to be a growing passion, collectively and individually, to understand the foundation of our American culture and how we've turned from that. Personally, it steered me back toward a time when our country was rooted in agrarian ideals and words were powerful enough to begin a new world. Ben Franklin had such a practical approach toward nurturing virtue, the first point being nobody's perfect.

Since 2004 Young has been a spokeswoman for the FoodRoutes Network, a non-profit organization which aims to aid organizations in rebuilding local, community-based food systems by promoting sustainable agriculture and connecting consumers with local farmers who are willing to sell direct. Young used the release of The Art of Virtue to call attention to her involvement with the FoodRoutes Network.

Room to Grow furthers her involvement in this movement with lyrics and songs directly addressing the issue. Young advocates locally-grown and sustainable agriculture. A portion of each record sold of Room to Grow goes to the Save A Seed fund, which she created with the FoodRoutes Network and the American Community Gardening Association. The money provides non-genetically modified seeds to community gardens across North America.

Young has toured with help from the organization Buy Fresh Buy Local and each of the 49 FoodRoutes chapters. Along with her performances, each tour stop offered sustainable living workshops with local sponsors in each community.

Young says her music has influenced her activism because she feels at peace in nature and wants to communicate those feelings through her music.

In 2010, Young hosted and organized the Backyard Revolution, a group of people sharing and demonstrating skills to help educate people in self-sustainability. The Backyard Revolution was present at Floyd Fest 9 (2010) and the Heritage Harvest Festival at Thomas Jefferson's Monticello. Demonstrations included dairy cow milking, hide tanning and bow drill fire-making, home fermentation, historic log cabin construction, arrow fletching, soap making, cooking, and edible and medicinal wild plant foraging.

== Awards and recognition ==
- Plow to the End of the Row original version (2003) nominated for Debut Artist by the Freeform American Roots DJ Chart
- "Sadie's Song" won Chris Austin songwriting contest at MerleFest
- Plow to the End of the Row (2004) nominated for Grammy Award for Best Recording Package
- Plow to the End of the Row won Just Plain Folks Music Awards Roots Album of the Year
- "I Cannot Justify" won Just Plain Folks Music Awards Best Roots Songs of the Year
- Nominated for Americana Music Association Emerging Artist of the Year
- "Home Remedy" won Nashville Scene Best Country Single
- The Art of Virtue placed third in Amazon.com's best folk recordings of the year
- Room to Grow named Nashville Scene Top Five Albums From Singer-Songwriters of the Year

== Discography ==
=== Albums ===
Title	Album details	Peak positions
Title	Album details	US Bluegrass
Plow to the End of the Row	Release date: April 13, 2004; Label: AddieBelle	—
The Art of Virtue	Release date: June 28, 2005; Label: AddieBelle	15
Room to Grow	Release date: May 22, 2007; Label: AddieBelle	—
"—" denotes releases that did not chart

=== Singles ===
- "Just Like Christmas" with Tim O'Brien (2004) AddieBelle (promo CD and download only) —

=== Music videos ===
Year	Title
2008	"Home Remedy"
2008	"My Love Will Keep"
