= Sundown Over Ghost Town =

Studio album by Eilen Jewell
- Released: May 26, 2015
- Studio: Audio Lab (Boise, Idaho)
- Genre: Country
- Length: 37:17
- Label: Signature Sounds
- Producer: Eilen Jewell and Jason Beek

Eilen Jewell chronology
Live at The Narrows (2014)	Sundown Over Ghost Town (2015)	Down Hearted Blues (2017)

Sundown Over Ghost Town is the sixth studio album by American singer-songwriter Eilen Jewell. Produced by Jewell and drummer Jason Beek, it was released on May 18, 2015 through Signature Sounds. The album was Jewell's first release since relocating to her hometown of Boise after living and working in the Boston area for a decade. Reviewers noted the move, which gave the album a homecoming theme, and a songwriting shift toning down Jewell's standard hard-bitten tales of anonymous troubled souls to more autobiographical and contemplative songs than on previous albums.

== Background ==
After making money from her music by busking while at St. John's College in Santa Fe and then Venice Beach, Jewell launched her career in earnest after moving to Boston in 2003. There she met Jason Beek, a drummer who eventually became her manager and husband, and the other core members of her band, guitarist Jerry Miller and bassist John Sciascia. Jewell spent ten years playing at regular gigs in the Boston area and touring extensively with her band before deciding to return to Boise. In an interview with Idaho Public Television, she attributed the return to homesickness, saying all of her family is in Idaho, and also to a need for space. She explained about Boston: "I always felt a bit crowded, and I'm a girl that needs a little elbow room. I think I'm just western by nature, so it was really good to come home."

To emphasize the point of feeling a need to return, Jewell pointed to the place the Western United States plays in her creative process, and called the record "a very Idaho album". She explained, "in the west in general is where I draw a lot of inspiration. But this one is extra Idaho, because not only was it completely written here, it was also recorded here, and all of our guest musicians are Idahoans." Between the return to her hometown and the release of the album, Jewell gave birth to her daughter, Mavis, which fueled more creativity. She said the process of caring for a child presented to her "an overwhelming amount of love. I feel like everything had become more difficult and beautiful all at the same time. There’s a lot of room for inspiration from that because it is so rewarding."

== Reception ==
Critics and reviewers noted the more sedate tone of the songs on the album, which they enjoyed. Hal Horowitz of American Songwriter wrote that compared to her songs on her previous studio album Queen of the Minor Key, "lovely, softer but no less tantalizing jazz/country dominates the playlist. Jewell is in wonderful voice using her Billie Holiday phrasing to infuse soul and emotion to the slow, sticky swamp of 'Down the Road', the sweet Neil Young styled country folk of 'Some Things Weren’t Meant to Be' and 'Here With Me'′s languid, sultry club noir." Kate Laddish writing in The Davis Enterprise gave a similar description of the album, saying "Instead of songs populated by characters living in dimly lit rooms, 'Sundown' carries the intimacy and freedom of walking under star-strewn Western skies."

Finding a lot to think about in the lyrics, reviewer Jeremy Bonfiglio identified the album opener "Worried Mind" as "a bittersweet song of searching and redemption", and highlighted "Half-Broke Horse", which Jewell told Bonfiglio is about her self-perceived awkwardness and the feeling of always having to figure out her "place on the planet". Bonfiglio noticed the Idaho connections, pointing out "guest artists brought in to lend some extra layers – Jake Hoffman on pedal steel, Jack Gardner on trumpet, and Steve Fulton on organ and electric piano – also hail from Idaho, emphasizing the connectivity between sound and place."

Steve Horowitz of PopMatters was highly impressed by the poetry and instrumentation on Sundown Over Ghost Town, seeing them as providing Jewell's vocals with "a wide-screen setting". He said describing scenes like “a lucky horseshoe in a pile of junk” and “a hot rod decaying in the thorns and the weeds” to represent "Some Things Weren’t Meant to Be" "evokes poetry more than song lyrics."

== Track listing ==
All songs by Eilen Jewell

1. Worried Mind - 3:16
2. Hallelujah Band - 2:54
3. Rio Grande - 3:23
4. Half-Broke Horse - 3:27
5. My Hometown - 3:24
6. Needle & Thread - 3:41
7. Down The Road - 2:36
8. Somethings Weren't Meant To Be - 3:07
9. Pages - 2:31
10. Green Hills - 2:24
11. Here With Me - 3:24
12. Songbird - 3:10

== Personnel ==
Credits adapted from the album's liner notes.

=== Musicians ===
- Eilen Jewell – vocals, acoustic guitar, harmonica
- Jason Beek – drums, percussion, vocals
- Mavis Beek – vocals
- Steve Fulton – hammond organ, wurlitzer electric piano, vocals
- Jack Gardner - trumpet
- Jake Hoffman – pedal steel
- Jerry Miller – electric guitar, mandolin
- Johnny Sciascia – upright bass

=== Production ===
- Eilen Jewell – producer
- Jason Beek – producer
- Steve Fulton – engineering, mixing
- Pat Storey – engineering
- Jeff Lipton – mastering
- Maria Rice – assistant mastering engineer
- Otto Kissinger – photography
- sketchiedesign – design
