= Heartache Boulevard =

EP by Eilen Jewell
- Released: April 29, 2008
- Studios: Signature Sounds Studios, Middleville Studio
- Genre: Country
- Length: 17:54
- Label: Signature Sounds
- Producers: Eilen Jewell and her band

Eilen Jewell chronology
Letters from Sinners & Strangers (2007)	Heartache Boulevard (2008)	Sea of Tears (2009)

Heartache Boulevard is an EP by American singer-songwriter Eilen Jewell. Released in early 2008 following the critical success of Jewell's 2007 album Letters from Sinners & Strangers, it was produced by Jewell and her band and issued on the Signature Sounds label.

Jewell was one of the standout new Americana artists of 2007, gaining national recognition for her singing and writing. Heartache Boulevard is a set of five songs, two released previously, offered by Jewell to maintain audience interest while preparing a full-length album.

The title song "Heartache Boulevard" was previously found on Letters from Sinners & Strangers, while the political statement song "The Flood", regarding the federal government response in New Orleans to the catastrophic destruction and death caused by Hurricane Katrina, first appeared on Jewell's 2006 debut album, Boundary County. Both were written by Jewell.

The three previously unreleased songs on the EP include covers of selections by jazz legend Billie Holiday and bluegrass pioneer Lester Flatt, and a rendering of the country/blues crossover traditional song previously recorded as "Tain't Nobody's Bizness if I Do" in 1923 by Bessie Smith.

== Track listing ==
as listed in the CD liner notes.

1. "Heartache Boulevard" (Eilen Jewell) - 2:44
2. "Fine & Mellow" (Billie Holiday) - 4:11
3. "The Flood" (Jewell) - 4:31
4. "I'm Head Over Heels in Love" (Lester Flatt) - 2:40
5. "Nobody's Business" (traditional) - 3:48

== Personnel ==
as listed in the CD liner notes.

=== Musicians ===
- Jason Beek - drums, vocals
- Jerry Miller - guitars
- Johnny Sciascia - upright bass
- Daniel Kellar - fiddle

=== Production ===
- Eilen Jewell - producer
- Jason Beek - producer
- Jerry Miller - producer
- Johnny Sciascia - producer, mastering
- Daniel Kellar - producer
- Chris Rival - engineering
- Mark Thayer - engineering
