= Amy Loftus =

American singer-songwriter

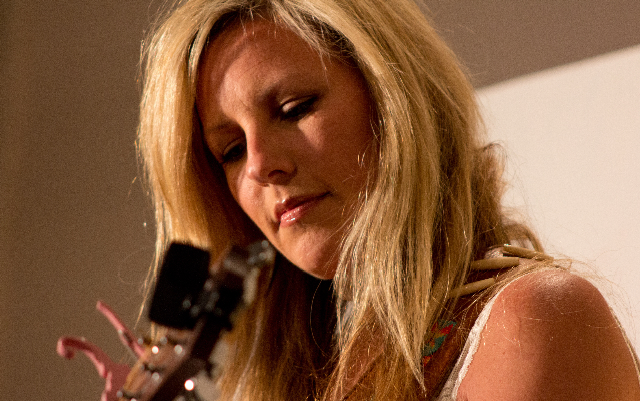

Background information
- Born: Chicago, Illinois, US
- Origin: Nashville, Tennessee
- Genres: Folk, country, pop
- Occupations: Singer-songwriter
- Instruments: Vocals, guitar, keyboards
- Years active: 2000–present
- Labels: Lakeshore Records
- Website: Official website

Amy Loftus is an American singer-songwriter, now resident in Los Angeles.

She worked as an actress in Los Angeles in the late 1990s, appearing in Days of Our Lives, HBO's Tracey Takes On... and in the films Introducing Dorothy Dandridge and The 13th Floor. She later moved to Nashville as part of a musical duo, before going solo and beginning to tour on her own. Her first solo record Straight to Amy was produced by Will Kimbrough and released in 2005.

Loftus was named "Best New Singer/Songwriter" by Nashville Scene magazine in their October 27, 2005 "Best of Nashville" edition, and she placed third in the "Folk/Singer-Songwriter" category in the International Songwriting Competition in 2006 for the song "Work to Do" written with Will Kimbrough.

In 2011 she signed with Lakeshore Records, and in 2012 her song "Surrender" was written for the One For The Money soundtrack. She continues to tour and perform in the Los Angeles area.

== Early life and education ==
Amy Loftus was born and raised in Chicago, Illinois. She sang in private throughout her youth, and began writing poetry around the age of six. As a child she avidly listened to musicians such as Bob Dylan, Shawn Colvin, and Joni Mitchell, and also loved Rodgers and Hammerstein musicals. Other early influences included Annie Lenox, Stevie Wonder, Kate Bush, and Peter Gabriel.

While in Chicago she was an alumnus of the improv acting group The Second City. She also was a member of a professional dance company. She began to focus as well on singing at age 21, after an experience where she was invited on stage to sing "Revolution" by Tracy Chapman, after the male singer of the band the Cartoon Gypsies couldn't reach the notes. She later showed the band samples of her journals and poetry, and became their lead singer from 1994 to 1997, cutting one album.

In 1996 Loftus earned a degree in painting and art history from the University of Kansas, and then went on to study acting, all while writing songs.

== Career ==
Following graduation Loftus moved to Los Angeles to pursue acting. From 1998 to 2000 she made appearances on Days of Our Lives and HBO's Tracey Takes On..., and in the films Introducing Dorothy Dandridge and The 13th Floor. She also became one half of a musical duo and began learning guitar in 1998 for co-writing, but still only "barely played." In LA she held a number of part-time jobs, including as a limo driver for music producer Jerry Leiber. In 1999 he gave her the advice to focus on her most necessary artistic outlet.

In 2000 she moved into a van and left Los Angeles for Nashville, booking a year of shows for the musical duo she was in at the time. According to Loftus, the duo was moving towards a traditional record deal in Nashville. However, she began to feel she was not contributing to the co-writing sessions and that her solo material was being phased out by the label. In 2001, after seeing Bonnie Raitt perform at Jazz Fest in New Orleans, Loftus was inspired to fire her managers and duck the record deal.

By the spring of 2002 she was actively learning guitar, and began recording her own demos. In 2002 she befriended Nashville producer Will Kimbrough and began to work with him musically. He would produce her first two albums. In 2003 she began performing solo shows, touring to sing her own material, living in her van and at times trading yoga lessons to pay for musicians.

=== Straight To Amy (2005) ===
Her debut LP Straight to Amy was produced by Kimbrough, who also provided banjo, dobro, piano, and electric guitar and co-wrote and shared lead vocals on the track "Work To Do." The CD's title was in allusion to her included cover of The Clash's "Straight To Hell". Seeing Bonnie Raitt and quitting her development deal inspired the song "Artificial Glare" which was the first cut for Straight to Amy and her first song played on the radio (Lightning 100 Nashville) The album was first available digitally on March 18, 2005.

After the release Loftus was named "Best New Singer/Songwriter" by the Nashville Scene. The track Nashville Doesn't Sleep Here Tonight played on BBC Radio 2's Bob Harris' country show on January 19, 2006. The track "Work to Do" also placed third in the International Songwriting Competition. "Cavalier" also placed 7th in the 2007 CMT/INSAI songwriting contest.

A review stated, "Overall it's Amy’s uniquely strong, smart songwriting that coalesces a vintage country vibe with an airy romp through contemporary alt-rock that makes her one of the best new voices in this burgeoning genre." "Another review stated "her voice is sweet with shades of Stacey Earle or perhaps Kim Richey. Her brutally honest songs dressed in Kimbrough’s talented hands makes for a winning combination."

=== Later albums ===
Her second LP, Better, was also produced by Kimbrough. It was recorded live to a two-track analog by engineer/producer Lij, and released in 2007. It went on to be positively received by BBC radio host Bob Harris. By January 2008 Loftus was touring with Will Kimbrough, opening for him and performing some songs together with him at each show.

In January 2008 she released the EP Fireworks, which she co-produced with John Deaderick, a keyboardist who had previously played with Patty Griffin and Emmylou Harris. She released the EP Peas and Carrots in November 2008, which was self-produced and only released digitally.

=== Later touring ===
By 2008 she had toured out of Nashville steadily for four years to support all her albums, and at the end of that year she returned to Los Angeles. She began to perform locally, and an AP writer wrote "It’s a rare thing in LA to have a bar full of people shut up and listen. A voice as hauntingly soul-stirring as Alison Krauss." In June 2010 a review of performance at the Viper Room wrote "Her sound is reminiscent of Jewel...subconsciously aware or not, she owns her music and has a unique vocal styling. Amy and her songwriting partner perform in a cohesive, symbiotic way throughout their set, which made them unobtrusive, but centered in your attention all at once. Her voice is an angelic masterpiece."

In January 2009 she founded the label Appletree, which she releases her music under. In 2012 Loftus made a cover album for Lakeshore Records.

"Surrender" (2012)

In January 2012 her single "Surrender" was included in the soundtrack of the film One for the Money, a comedy starring Katherine Heigl based on the popular Stephanie Plum series of books by Janet Evanovich. In 2011 Lakeshore Entertainment had invited her to pre-screen the film, then asked her to write a song that "Stephanie Plum would ride around in her car and listen to really loud."

== Personal life ==
Loftus lives in Los Angeles with two German Shepherds. She is a yoga instructor privately and for Equinox Fitness, having been involved in yoga from a young age.

== Discography ==
=== Albums ===
- 2005: Straight to Amy
- 2007: Better
- 2008: Fireworks EP
- 2008: Peas and Carrots EP (digital only)

=== Singles ===
- 2010: "Closer I Get"

=== Soundtracks ===
- 2012: One for the Money (track "Surrender")
