= Butcher Holler: A Tribute to Loretta Lynn =

Studio album by Eilen Jewell
- Released: July 27, 2010
- Studio: Middleville Studio
- Genre: Country
- Label: Signature Sounds
- Producer: Eilen Jewell Band

Eilen Jewell chronology
Sea of Tears (2009)	Butcher Holler: A Tribute to Loretta Lynn (2010)	Queen of the Minor Key (2011)

Alternative cover
- Vinyl LP cover 2024

Butcher Holler: A Tribute to Loretta Lynn is a 2010 studio album by singer-songwriter Eilen Jewell and her band, appearing on the album artwork billed as Butcher Holler. The album was released on the Signature Sounds label with recording and mixing by Chris Rival.

Jewell presented a tribute album to Loretta Lynn in part by renaming her band "Butcher Holler" after the Kentucky mountain valley community where Lynn was raised, and which she mentioned in her signature song "Coal Miner's Daughter". Writing in Country Standard Time, reviewer C. Eric Banister noted the late-1960s to early-1970s timeframe of the songs when released by Lynn:

The song selection is a great cross-section of songs all written (with the exception of one co-write) by Lynn in one of her most creatively fertile periods. As an Eilen Jewell album, this tribute stands well with other albums in her catalog. As a tribute to Loretta Lynn, Jewell has hit a grand slam and hopefully it will draw more listeners to the back catalog of both artists.

== 2024 reissue ==
In late 2024, Jewell released a vinyl LP version of Butcher Holler featuring new cover artwork, along with live versions of "I'm a Honky Tonk Girl" and "Deep As Your Pocket", and a cover of "The Pill" which was released as a single on October 22, 2024. Jewell donated a percentage of sales from the single to Planned Parenthood, tying the history of "The Pill" to modern women's health concerns:

Loretta still holds the prestigious record for the singer of more banned radio hits than all other male country artists in the twentieth century combined. And ‘The Pill’ was the most banned of all of her songs, which is saying a lot. By recording and performing it live, I hope to do my part to spread the word about the importance of public access to family planning as an integral part of a woman’s right to the pursuit of happiness. It’s hard to believe this fight is still going on, but until it’s over I’ll be here for it.

== Track listing ==
All songs by Loretta Lynn, except where noted.

1. "Fist City" - 2:18
2. "A Man I Hardly Know" - 2:25
3. "I'm a Honky Tonk Girl" - 2:29
4. "Whispering Sea" - 2:53
5. "You Wanna Give Me A Lift" - 2:37
6. "Don't Come Home a Drinkin'" - 2:22
7. "Who Says God Is Dead" - 2:11
8. "Another Man Loved Me" (Alan Lorene, Loretta Lynn) - 3:07
9. "You Ain't Woman Enough (To Take My Man)" - 2:23
10. "Deep As Your Pocket" - 2:34
11. "This Haunted House" - 2:22
12. "You're Lookin' at Country" - 2:10

2024 vinyl LP re-issue bonus tracks

13. "The Pill" - 3:12
14. "I'm A Honky Tonk Girl" (Live) - 2:40
15. "Deep As Your Pocket" (Live) - 2:45

== Personnel ==
as listed in the CD booklet, 2010 release

Musicians
Appearing as "Butcher Holler":

- Eilen Jewell - vocals, acoustic guitar
- Jerry Miller - electric guitars, acoustic guitar, pedal steel
- Johnny Sciascia - upright bass
- Jason Beek - drums, percussion

Production

- Chris Rival - recording, mixing
- John Sciascia - mastering
- Michael Arthur - illustration
- Allie Justice - design
