= Room to Grow (album) =

Studio album by Adrienne Young
- Released: May 22, 2007
- Genre: Americana, Country, Folk
- Label: AddieBelle
- Producer: Adrienne Young

Adrienne Young chronology
The Art of Virtue (2005)	Room to Grow (2007)

Room to Grow is the third studio album by American singer-songwriter Adrienne Young.

It received a three and a half rating from AllMusic, which described it as "a very accomplished effort, Room to Grow also is very much an album about artistic growth and it will be interesting to see how Young grows as an artist in the future."

== Track listing ==
No.	Title	Writer(s)	Length
1.	"All for Good"	Adrienne Young / Will Kimbrough	4:49
2.	"Sgt. Early's Dream / Maids of Castlebar"	Traditional	3:50
3.	"Room to Grow"	Adrienne Young / Will Kimbrough	4:17
4.	"Natural Bridge"	Adrienne Young	4:02
5.	"In Between Heartbeats"	Adrienne Young	3:04
6.	"High Flyin' Dream"	Adrienne Young / Will Kimbrough	3:13
7.	"Free Man in Paris"	Joni Mitchell	4:12
8.	"River and a Dirt Road"	Adrienne Young	4:25
9.	"Givin Up the Flight"	Adrienne Young / Will Kimbrough	4:07
10.	"Dark Around the Moon"	Adrienne Young	3:31
11.	"How Is the World Better Now"	Adrienne Young	4:55
12.	"Once More" (with Mike Gordon)	Dusty Owens	3:25
13.	"Leaving It Behind"	Adrienne Young	4:40
14.	"Happy Ending"	Adrienne Young	1:04

== Personnel ==
- Dale Ann Bradley - vocal harmony
- Neil Cleary - drums
- Mike Gordon - bass, vocals
- Andy Hall - resonator guitar
- Craig Harmon - organ (Hammond, Wurlitzer)
- Hans Holzen - acoustic guitar, electric guitar
- Kyle Kegerreis - acoustic bass
- Will Kimbrough - acoustic guitar, electric guitar, resonator guitar, vocal harmony
- Eric Merrill - banjo, fiddle, harmony, vocal
- Edward O'Day - acoustic guitar, electric guitar
- Jason Oettel - bass, acoustic bass
- Gordon Stone - pedal steel
- Adrienne Young - banjo, acoustic guitar, vocals
