= Letters from Sinners & Strangers =

Studio album by Eilen Jewell
- Released: June 15, 2007
- Studio: Signature Sounds (Pomfret, Connecticut)
- Genre: Country
- Length: 37:27
- Label: Signature Sounds
- Producers: Eilen Jewell and her band

Eilen Jewell chronology
Boundary County (2006)	Letters from Sinners & Strangers (2007)	Heartache Boulevard (2008)

Letters from Sinners & Strangers is the second studio album by American singer-songwriter Eilen Jewell. Recorded at Signature Sounds Studios in Pomfret, Connecticut, it was released on June 15, 2007, through Signature Sounds. The 12-song set includes new songs written by Jewell and covers of music by Charlie Rich, Bob Dylan, and Eric Andersen.

== Background ==
Jewell's first studio album, Boundary County, was released in 2006. Americana record label Signature Sounds founder Jim Olsen was captivated by the album, later remarking that listening to it “feels like reading a long letter from an old friend”. Having arrived in Boston in 2003, by 2005 Jewell had started a residency at Tír na nÓg pub in Union Square, Somerville with her bandmates, while her singing and writing on Boundary County drew comparisons to June Carter Cash, Gillian Welch, and Lucinda Williams, raising anticipation for a follow-up album. Olsen attended an Eilen Jewell Band show at Club Helsinki in Great Barrington with a contract in hand and signed Jewell to record Letters from Sinners & Strangers.

== Reception ==
The album release was a success. Letters from Sinners & Strangers rose to Top 10 status on Americana charts, and was listed by reviewers on their annual "Best of 2007" lists. The band became known nationally, opening shows for Steve Forbert, Junior Brown, Chris Smither, and Loretta Lynn. Reviewer Jay Miller wrote that the album "found a sweet spot, equidistant between traditional country and folk, with a bit of bluesy flavor". The band's eclectic nature was highlighted when PopMatters critics noticed guitarist Jerry Miller adding licks from surf rock legend Dick Dale on "Dusty Boxcar Wall". The magazine described an "intriguing alternative history of American music: Dale travels back in time to the 1930s in order to trade in the sands of California beaches for the Oklahoma Dust Bowl." Rick Tevebough of Country Standard Time praised Jewell's subtlety on "Too Hot to Sleep": "Often in Jewell's vocal approach what's left unsaid between the words and lines set the feel and mood of the song perfectly. For just a second release, this disc is strong and confident from an artist worth keeping an ear on."

== Track listing ==
All songs by Eilen Jewell, except where noted.

1. "Rich Man's World" - 2:55
2. "Dusty Boxcar Wall" (Eric Andersen) - 2:43
3. "High Shelf Booze" - 3:38
4. "Thanks a Lot" (Charlie Rich) - 2:49
5. "Heartache Boulevard" - 2:41
6. "Too Hot to Sleep" - 2:30
7. "Where They Never Say Your Name" - 2:32
8. "How Long" - 3:07
9. "In the End" - 4:33
10. "If You Catch Me Stealing" (Traditional, arr. Eilen Jewell) - 4:09
11. "Walking Down the Line" (Bob Dylan) - 3:37
12. "Blue Highway" - 2:13

== Personnel ==
Credits adapted from the album's liner notes.

=== Musicians ===
- Eilen Jewell – vocals, acoustic guitar (all except 3, 6, 8), harmonica (1, 11)
- Jason Beek – drums, background vocals (2, 3, 8, 11)
- Daniel Kellar – violin (all except 3, 6)
- Jerry Miller – electric guitar, acoustic guitar (3, 6, 8, 9)
- Johnny Sciascia – upright bass, background vocals (8)
- Alec Spiegelman – clarinet (3), bass clarinet (6)

=== Production ===
- Eilen Jewell – producer
- Jason Beek – producer
- Daniel Kellar – producer
- Jerry Miller – producer
- Johnny Sciascia – producer, mastering
- Mark Thayer – engineering, mixing
- Lumen Eclipse – design
- Jennifer Lucey-Brzoza – photography
