= Queen of the Minor Key =

Studio album by Eilen Jewell
- Released: June 28, 2011
- Studio: Middleville Studios
- Genre: Country, Blues, Rockabilly
- Length: 37:58
- Label: Signature Sounds
- Producer: Eilen Jewell and her band

Eilen Jewell chronology
Butcher Holler: A Tribute to Loretta Lynn (2010)	Queen of the Minor Key (2011)	Live at The Narrows (2014)

Queen of the Minor Key is the fifth studio album by American singer-songwriter Eilen Jewell. Produced by Jewell and her band, it was released on June 28, 2011 through Signature Sounds. The album received good reviews, with Hal Horowitz of American Songwriter writing "Albums this impressive don’t come along often", and remarking that its "mix of sweet/sultry Southern country, swampy soul, ominous rockabilly and jazz-tinged surf is as intoxicating as it is stylish, delivered with the offhand grace, low-key charm and hazy noir intentions exuded in the finest ‘60s foreign films".

== Background ==
The album title references one of the two main key modes found in most Western popular music. Cultural traditions in such music often see use of major key compositions during celebrations and generally happy events, while minor key compositions are associated with funerals, sadness, and darkness. Before performing a show in Boston, Jewell was introduced to patrons by a fellow musician who, remarking on her penchant for writing songs in minor key, dubbed her "The Queen of the Minor Key". In a 2018 interview, Jewell declared her affinity, saying "I love the spookiness of the minor key. It has a way of drawing me in every time. I don’t know what it is about it…something about dropping that third a half step. Somehow, to my ear, it sounds heavier than the major key, more mysterious and yet more down to earth at the same time." The album's title cut has the singer's mother being told about her expected daughter, "Instead of riches and finery/She'll have a wealth of sad songs and whiskey" and live to become the queen of the minor key.

Jewell spent time living in a remote cabin without electricity or running water in her native Idaho to write the lyrics for Queen of the Minor Key. She also wrote songs for guest vocalists, which she hadn't done for her previous albums, including writing "Over Again" for Zoe Muth and "Long Road" for rockabilly bandleader Big Sandy.

== Track listing ==
All songs by Eilen Jewell.

1. Radio City - 1:36
2. I Remember You - 3:51
3. Queen of the Minor Key - 2:03
4. That's Where I'm Going - 2:14
5. Santa Fe - 4:32
6. Warning Signs - 2:32
7. Reckless - 2:07
8. Over Again - 4:02
9. Bang Bang Bang - 1:45
10. Hooked - 2:26
11. Only One - 3:45
12. Long Road - 2:51
13. Home to Me - 2:55
14. Kalimotxo - 1:19

== Personnel ==
Credits adapted from the album's liner notes.

=== Musicians ===
- Eilen Jewell – vocals, acoustic guitar, harmonica
- Jason Beek – vocals, drums, percussion
- Jerry Miller – acoustic, electric, and pedal steel guitars
- Johnny Sciascia – upright bass
- Big Sandy – vocals
- Rich Dubois – fiddle
- Zoe Muth – vocals
- David Sholl – tenor and baritone saxophones
- Tom West – organ

=== Production ===
- Eilen Jewell and her band – producer
- Chris Rival – engineering, mixing
- John Sciascia – mastering
- Erik Jacobs – photography
