= Room to Grow (video game) =

2021 video game

- Developer: Mischka Kamener
- Publisher: Mischka Kamener
- Composer: Romain Rope
- Platform: Microsoft Windows
- Release: 25 February 2021
- Genre: Puzzle
- Mode: Single-player

Room to Grow is 2021 indie puzzle video game developed and published by Mischka Kamener. The player controls a cactus which can elongate itself across the grid-based space. The objective of each level is to control its cactus to move other another cactus or multiple cacti to its goal, a small grey circle. The game was positively received with praise for its challenging puzzles, atmosphere, and soundtrack though its simple concept had a more mixed reception and its lack of narrative was criticized.

== Gameplay ==
Room to Grow is an indie puzzle video game. The player controls a cactus which can elongate itself across the grid-based space. The movement has been compared to that of Snake. The objective of the each level is to control its cactus to move other another cactus or multiple cacti to its goal, a small grey circle. The game is presented in a cartoon art style.

== Development and release ==
Room to Grow was developed and published by Mischka Kamener. The music and sound design was done by Romain Rope. It was released on 25 February 2021.

== Reception ==
Reception

Aggregate score
Aggregator	Score
Metacritic	76/100

Room to Grow received "generally positive reviews" according to review aggregator Metacritic based on eight reviews.

Rocío Torrejón of MeriStation praised the simple and "attractive" design, though criticized the "simple concept". Torrejón praised the way the same puzzle could be completed in different ways.

Critics criticized the lack of narrative. Jamie Davies of GameGrin called it "hollow" due its lack of narrative, player leaderboards, or level editor. Davies went on to praise its soundtrack and challenging puzzles saying: "genuinely challenging experience for those who are constantly on the lookout for new brain-teasers to keep their mind active".

Critics praised the soundtrack which was deemed as relaxing and fitting to the game.
