= FoodRoutes Network =

FoodRoutes Network (FRN), headquartered in Arnot, Pennsylvania in the United States, is a national non-profit organization that provides support to a variety of other localized groups that encourage sustainable agriculture and community-based food systems.

Its goal is to re-introduce Americans to their food: the seeds from which it grows, the farmers who produce it, and the routes it takes from the farm to their tables. They are the national coordinator for the 'Buy Fresh Buy Local' chapter network, with over 50 chapters as of 2007.

Its most visible efforts have been a series of marketing campaigns designed to make consumers aware of the benefits of buying and eating local food. FRN also maintains a website where consumers nationwide can find farms in their areas that sell direct to the public as well as restaurants that buy and serve locally grown food.
