= Tommy Womack =

American singer-songwriter and author (born 1962)

- Born: November 20, 1962 (age 63); Sturgis, Kentucky, United States
- Origin: Nashville, Tennessee, United States
- Genres: Post-punk, roots rock
- Formerly of: Government Cheese, Bis-Quits
- Website: www.tommywomack.com

Tommy Womack (born November 20, 1962, in Sturgis, Kentucky) is an American singer-songwriter and author.

== Career ==
=== Early endeavors ===
Womack played with the band Government Cheese from 1985 to 1992. He wrote an engaging memoir about this experience called Cheese Chronicles: The True Story of a Rock 'n Roll Band You Never Heard Of. It was originally published in 1995 and its reputation grew enough to warrant multiple printings. Nashville Scene said, "his hilariously honest memoirs...have become a cult favorite among musicians both famous and unknown".

Womack later joined the Bis-quits, which released one album on Oh Boy Records in 1993.

In the mid-1990s, Womack began writing songs with Jason Ringenberg of Jason & the Scorchers, a band that Womack had idolized. Looking back in 2012, Ringenberg said that he'd originally viewed Womack as a pest, but he gained respect after reading The Cheese Chronicles. They co-wrote three of the first four songs on the Scorchers' 1996 album Clear Impetuous Morning.

=== Solo career ===
Womack released his first solo album, Positively Na-Na, in 1998, followed by another one, Stubborn, two years later. In 2002, he released Circus Town, his third solo album. Womack and his band released an album in 2003 entitled Washington, D.C., which was recorded live in an XM Satellite Radio studio. In 2007, he released There, I Said It!, which became his biggest success. The album's success led to Womack receiving glowing reviews from the national press and offers for international gigs. He followed it with the 2012 album, Now What!, which contained songs about a wide variety of topics, such as family life and the perils of road life.

Womack's songs have been recorded by Jimmy Buffett, Jason Ringenberg, Dan Baird, David Olney, Todd Snider, Kevin Fowler, Scott Kempner, and others.

He is the author of two books. In addition to Cheese Chronicles, the other work is Lavender Boys and Elsie, an offbeat Civil War novel (self-published in 2008).

Womack's eighth full-length album I Thought I Was Fine was released in 2021 and received an "A" review from veteran critic Robert Christgau, who claimed that "never has this Nashville lifer made more of his knack for words and the tunes to put them across ... so funny and humane that you can't help rooting for him."

== Personal life ==
Womack is married to Beth Womack, née Beth Tucker, an Emmy winner for her work on WTVF in Nashville; she now works for Metropolitan Nashville Public Schools. They live in Nashville with their son and pets. In June 2015, he was injured in a car crash in Sonora, Kentucky, when his Nissan Sentra was broadsided by a tractor trailer. The crash broke four bones in his pelvis.

Womack is active on Facebook and has frequently posted publicly there about his battles with bladder cancer and his sobriety.

== Discography ==
=== Solo albums ===
- Positively Na Na (1998)
- Stubborn (2000)
- Circus Town (2002)
- Washington D.C. (2003)
- There, I Said It! (2007)
- Now What! (2012)
- Namaste (2016)
- I Thought I Was Fine (2021)

=== With Bis-Quits ===
- The Bis-quits, The Bis-quits (1993)

=== With Daddy ===
- Daddy at the Women's Club Daddy (2005)
- For a Second Time Daddy (2009)

=== With Government Cheese ===
- Live! Three Chords, No Waiting (1989)
- Government Cheese (1992)
- Government Cheese: 1985-1995 (2011)
- Government Cheese: The Late Show (2015)
- Government Cheese: Love (2022)

=== With Todd Snider ===
- The Devil You Know (2006)
- Peace, Love and Anarchy (Rarities, B-Sides and Demos, Vol. 1) (2007)

=== Other appearances ===
- Lucky 13, (with The Bis-quits) (1998)
- Freedom Sings - First Amendment Center (2000)
- Freight Train Boogie: A Collection of Americana Music (2001)
- All Over Creation by Jason Ringenberg (2002)
- Home Away by Will Kimbrough (2002)
- The Gene Pitney Story Retold (2002)
- This is Where I Belong: The Songs of Ray Davies & The Kinks (With Bill Lloyd) (2002)
- Every Word: A Tribute to Let's Active (2003)
- Jambodians (2004)
- 35 Years: Bear Family Records (2010)
- The Six Sessions (with Will Kimbrough) (2010)
- The Oxford American-Southern Music CD #15 Featuring Music of Tennessee (2013)
