= Eilen Jewell =

American singer-songwriter (born 1979)

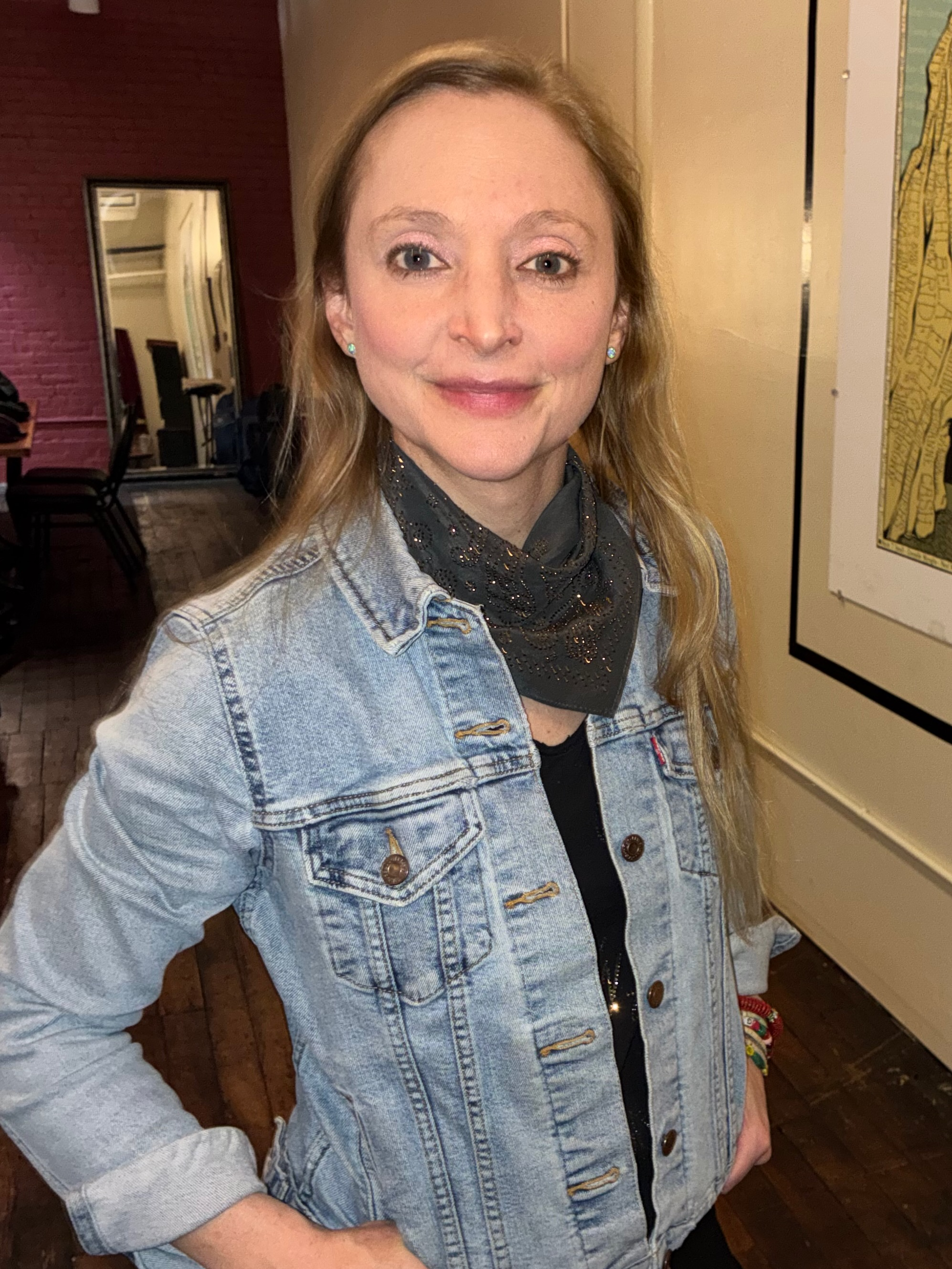
- Jewell in 2026

Background information
- Born: April 6, 1979 (age 47); Boise, Idaho, United States
- Genres: Americana; blues; country; folk; gospel; honky-tonk
- Occupation: Singer-songwriter
- Instruments: Vocals, guitar
- Years active: 1998–present
- Label: Signature Sounds
- Spouses: Jason Beek (m. 2003; div. 2020) Blake Shields (m. 2024)
- Website: www.eilenjewell.com

Eilen Jewell (/ˈiːlɪn/ EE-lin; born April 6, 1979) is an American singer-songwriter from Boise, Idaho. She has released nine studio albums and one live album. Her musical style crosses several areas of Americana music, ranging from blues to gospel, country, rockabilly, and honky-tonk. Given during an on-stage introduction at a show in Boston by a fellow musician, she has taken the title "Queen of the Minor Key".

== Early life and education ==
Jewell grew up in Boise, Idaho. Demonstrating an early interest in music, she requested piano lessons at age seven, and began writing and recording her own songs a year later. She began learning guitar at fifteen, with her father's record collection raising her interest in learning how to play like blues performers Mississippi John Hurt and Howlin' Wolf. Jewell attended St. John's College in Santa Fe, New Mexico.

== Career ==
Jewell began her musical career busking on the streets of Santa Fe while attending college. She then moved to Los Angeles and performed on the streets of Venice Beach. Jewell subsequently moved to Massachusetts in 2003, first living with friends in Great Barrington before moving east to Boston. There, she briefly busked in subway stations which she called "the opposite" of Venice Beach, saying the cold, underground atmosphere compelled her to give up busking and seek to perform at local music clubs.

=== Boston: 2003–2012 ===
Soon following her relocation and decision to try performing on stage, Jewell met drummer Jason Beek. Recording a "live demo" album in 2005 called Nowhere in Time, Jewell landed a Saturday residency at the now-closed Tír na nÓg pub in Union Square, Somerville. Beek introduced her to guitarist Jerry Miller, and with the addition of upright bass player Johnny Sciascia, the core of Jewell's band for over a decade was formed. Beek and Jewell married, and Beek served as Jewell's manager as well as being her drummer and husband.

During an interview with Cape Cod Times in 2017, Jewell remarked: "If it weren’t for Boston and the Boston music scene and Boston being a magnet for great musicians, I don’t think I would have a musical career.” Prior to performing a show during that time, she was introduced to patrons by a fellow musician who, remarking on her penchant for writing songs in minor key, dubbed Jewell "The Queen of the Minor Key".

Jewell's first studio album Boundary County was released in 2006. Americana record label Signature Sounds Recordings founder Jim Olsen was captivated by the album, later remarking that listening to it “feels like reading a long letter from an old friend”. Olsen signed Jewell to his label, releasing the follow-up Letters from Sinners & Strangers in 2007.

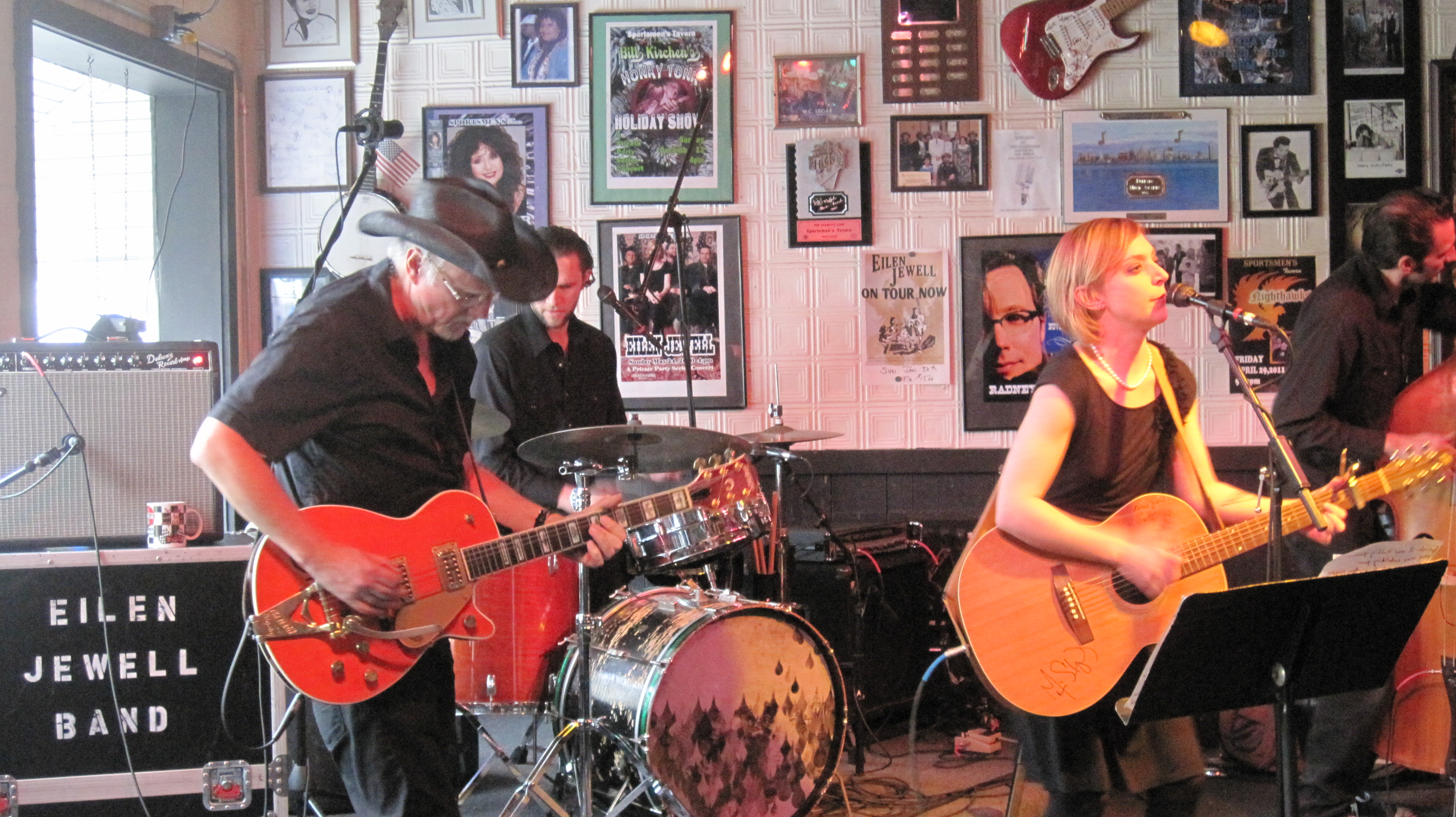
Jewell and her band in Buffalo, New York, 2011.

Jewell, along with other members of her band and members of the Tarbox Ramblers, formed The Sacred Shakers for Sunday gospel brunch performances at The Plough and Stars pub in Cambridge in 2008. The band performed decades-old gospel blues songs mainly found in the public domain. In early 2009 Jewell released the album Sea of Tears.

In 2010, Jewell released Butcher Holler, a collection featuring the band covering songs Loretta Lynn wrote and sang in the first dozen years of her career. Referring to her adopted nickname, in 2011 she issued her fourth album of original music, Queen of the Minor Key.

Jewell and her band have toured the U.S., Canada, Europe, the UK and Australia, including performances at South by Southwest and NPR's World Cafe. The album Live at The Narrows, recorded in Fall River, was released in 2014.

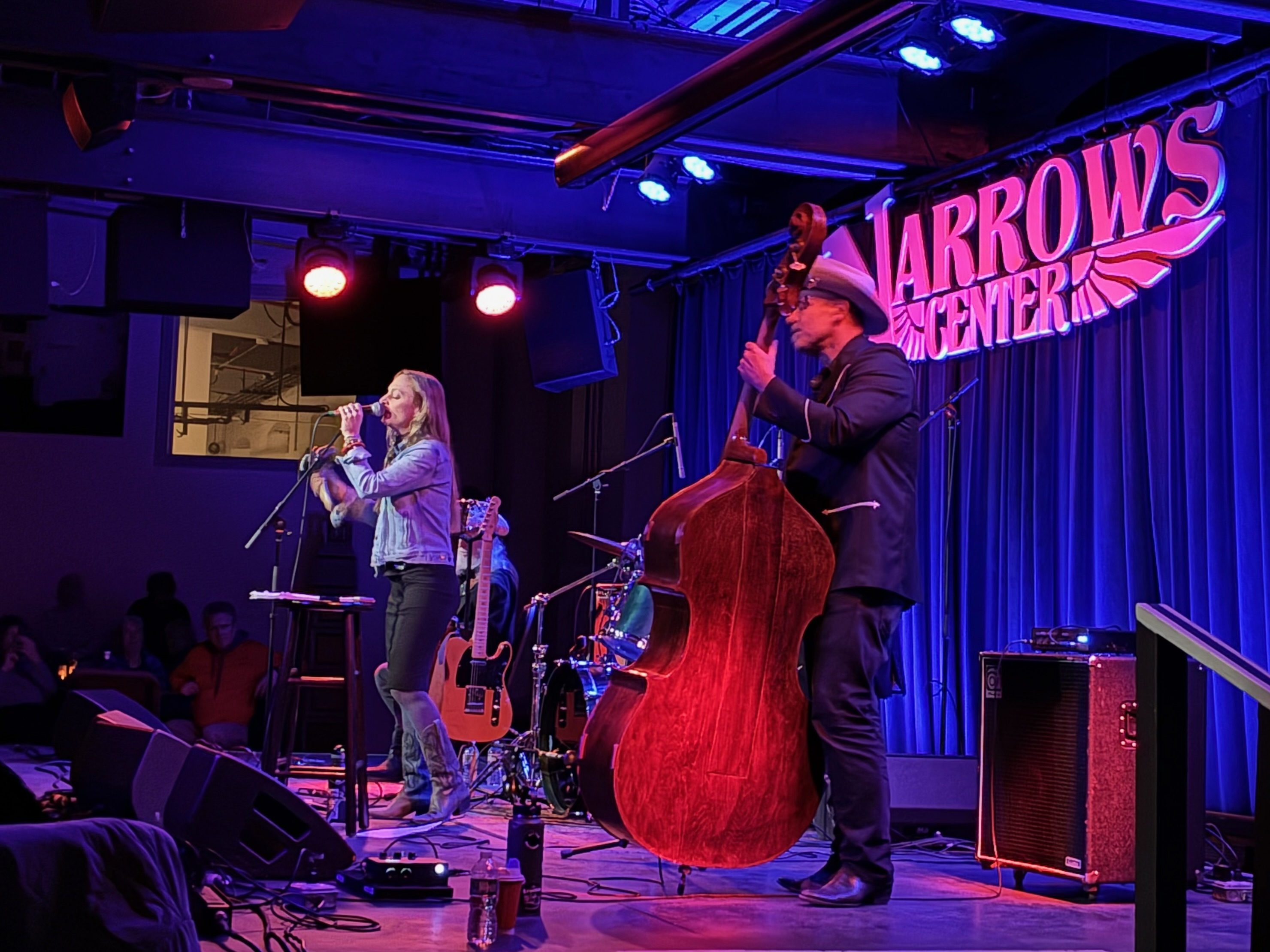
Jewell singing at the Narrows Center in Fall River, Massachusetts, March 2026.

=== Return to Boise: since 2012 ===
After living in Boston for several years, Jewell returned to Boise with Beek in around 2012. Her 2015 album, Sundown Over Ghost Town, was largely inspired by her return to Boise. The 2017 album release of Down Hearted Blues marked Jewell's second set of cover songs, featuring compositions by vintage blues artists such as Alberta Hunter, who penned the title song. This was followed in 2019 by Gypsy, which featured Jewell on electric guitar for the first time.

Jewell and Beek's marriage began to fall apart in 2020, and the couple divorced. Jewell's 2023 album release Get Behind the Wheel chronicles the breakup with the closing song "The Bitter End". In late 2024, Jewell released a vinyl LP version of Butcher Holler featuring new cover artwork, new live versions of two songs, and a cover of Loretta Lynn's 1975 single "The Pill".

In a post on her Facebook page on February 15, 2026, Jewell announced she would be taking a possibly permanent break from touring, writing "A gut feeling is telling me to get off the road, at least for now. After 2026, touring and I will part ways for a year, maybe two, maybe fifty...it’s hard to say at this point." After featuring the song in her shows during the past year, Jewell released a single version of "Deportee (Plane Wreck at Los Gatos)" on March 24, 2026. The song comments on dehumanization, and laments that the nameless label 'deportee' was used in reporting about farm workers who died in a plane crash while being expelled from the United States in 1948, a situation the lyrics seek to repair by having the singer voice victims' names. Commenting on the song, Jewell said "It’s disheartening to think that Woody Guthrie wrote 'Deportee' nearly 80 years ago and it still rings true. What can I do but join him in fighting fascism the only way I know how? With my conscience, with my guitar, with my voice".

== Personal life ==
Jewell was married to her drummer and manager Jason Beek between 2003 and 2020. After a first mention in a social media posting about her "fiancé" in June 2023, Jewell married actor Blake Shields in November 2024. The couple collaborated on an event dubbed "Boise Art Happening", with storytelling, music, and poetry reading, in March, 2026 in Boise.

== Discography ==
=== Studio albums ===
- Boundary County (2006)
- Letters from Sinners & Strangers (2007)
- Sea of Tears (2009)
- Butcher Holler: A Tribute to Loretta Lynn (2010)
- Queen of the Minor Key (2011)
- Sundown Over Ghost Town (2015)
- Down Hearted Blues (2017)
- Gypsy (2019)
- Get Behind the Wheel (2023)

=== Live albums ===
- Live at The Narrows (2014)

=== EPs and singles ===
- Heartache Boulevard (2008) EP
- "A Satisfied Mind" (2020)
- "Green River" / "Summertime" (2020)
- "Pretty Paper" (2021)
- "Deportee" (2026)
- "Soul Kitchen" (2026)

=== with The Sacred Shakers ===
- The Sacred Shakers (The Sacred Shakers) (2008)
- Live (The Sacred Shakers) (2014)
