= Will Kimbrough =

American singer-songwriter

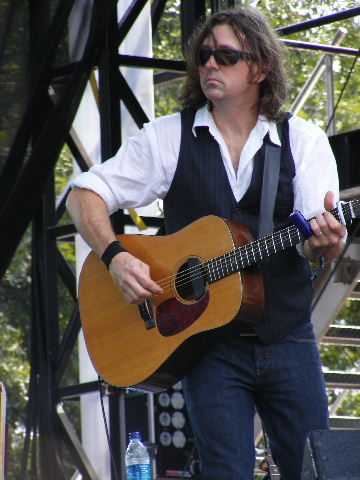
- Austin City Limits Music Festival (2008)

Background information
- Born: William Adams Kimbrough; May 1, 1964 (age 62); Mobile, Alabama, United States
- Genres: Country; Folk
- Occupations: Musician, songwriter, producer
- Instruments: Vocals, guitar, accordion, banjo, bass guitar, dobro, harmonica
- Years active: 1985–present
- Labels: Lost Highway, Oh Boy Records
- Website: www.willkimbrough.com

William Adams Kimbrough (born May 1, 1964) is an American singer-songwriter, multi-instrumentalist and producer based in Nashville, Tennessee, United States.

== Biography ==
Kimbrough was born in Mobile, Alabama. He started his musical career as a founding member of Will & the Bushmen, a college band in the 1980s that recorded a handful of albums and singles and made it to MTV. He then went on to form the Bis-Quits with long-time friend Tommy Womack. The Bis-quits produced an eponymous album which was released on John Prine’s Oh Boy Records label.

Kimbrough is also a producer and has produced albums for Adrienne Young, Rodney Crowell, Todd Snider, Kate Campbell, Steve Poltz, Kim Richey, Garrison Starr, Matthew Ryan, and Josh Rouse.

His songs have been recorded by Jimmy Buffett, Little Feat, Jack Ingram, Todd Snider and more. Kimbrough has also collaborated with many artists including Rosanne Cash, Guy Clark, Rodney Crowell, Steve Earle, Gomez, Emmylou Harris, The Jayhawks, Mark Knopfler, Buddy Miller, John Prine, Toumani Diabaté, Kim Richey, Josh Rouse, Matthew Ryan, Billy Joe Shaver, Todd Snider, Michael C. Parris, Mavis Staples, Garrison Starr, Adrienne Young, and others.

Kimbrough was recognized in 2004 as the Instrumentalist of the Year by the Americana Music Association – an award that had previously been awarded three years in a row to Jerry Douglas. His songs demonstrate a literate facility that he pairs with guitar playing so fluid that his fans created a t-shirt suggesting he is an alien.

Kimbrough teamed up with Tommy Womack, John Deaderick, Paul Griffith and Dave Jacques in 2005 to create the five piece band, Daddy. They recorded a live album in Frankfort, Kentucky, Daddy at the Women's Club, and another album, For a Second Time.

In 2007, Kimbrough released an EP – his solo studio recording that revealed a hint of what would develop on his next album release.

Kimbrough has released several solo albums to date, and has collaborated on many more, as well as serving as a session musician and sideman. Kimbrough was one of the guest artists at Jimmy Buffett's Live from the Gulf Coast concert on July 11, 2010.

In March 2012, it was announced that Kimbrough had joined Trigger Hippy in place of guitarist Audley Freed.

In frequent visits to visit his family, Kimbrough joined a number of other Southern Alabama singer-songwriters beginning in 2013 to form Willie Sugarcapps.

A song he co-wrote with John Hahn and recorded by Shemekia Copeland, "Too Far to Be Gone", was nominated for a Blues Music Award in 2023.

== Influences ==
Born and raised on the Alabama Gulf Coast, Kimbrough ingested eclectic FM radio sounds and the music of nearby New Orleans as a young man. His sound has been influenced by traditions of folk, blues, gospel, country, punk rock and jazz.

Kimbrough described "When Your Lovin' Comes Around" from his 2014 release, Sideshow Love, as "a little bit of a tribute to J. J. Cale", who he said was a significant influence on his music.

== Social commentary ==
The songs on his album Americanitis, such as "Warring Ways" and "Everyone's in Love", have been described by Kimbrough as anti-war and anti-greed themed.

His album Wings explores themes surrounding the conflicts between family and career, love and work, parents and children. The music is based in folk rock, with touches of guitar, cello, saxophone, trumpet, banjo, and Hammond organ.

== Discography ==
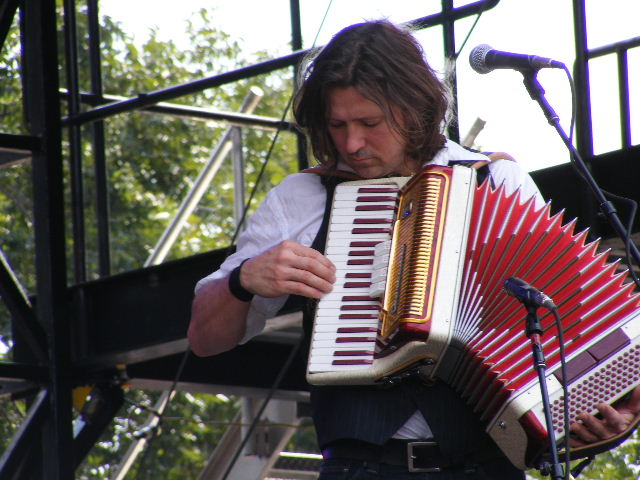
Kimbrough playing accordion at ACL Festival (2008)

=== Solo albums ===
- Fireworks, Vol. 2 (1999)
- This (2000)
- Home Away (2002)
- Godsend (2003)
- Americanitis (2006)
- EP (2007)
- Wings (2009)
- Sideshow Love (2014)
- I Like It Down Here (2019)
- For the Life of Me (2024)

Awards
Preceded by Jerry Douglas	AMA Instrumentalist of the Year; 2004	Succeeded by Sonny Landreth
