= Jamaica Mistaica =

Song by Jimmy Buffett

from the album Banana Wind
- Released: June 4, 1996
- Studio: Shrimpboat Sound, Key West, Florida
- Genre: Reggae, rock, Gulf and Western
- Length: 5:54
- Label: Margaritaville Records/MCA/ MCAD-11247 (US, CD)
- Songwriters: Jimmy Buffett, Russ Kunkel, Roger Guth, Peter Mayer and Jim Mayer
- Producers: Russell Kunkel, Jimmy Buffett

"Jamaica Mistaica" is a song written and performed by American popular music singer-songwriter Jimmy Buffett. It is the second track from his 1996 album Banana Wind. Despite Buffett not releasing any singles from the album, "Jamaica Mistaica" remains one of Buffett's most notable numbers from his '90s repertoire, due to the well-publicized incident it was written about, and is notable due to Buffett's sense of humor regarding the traumatizing incident.

== Incident ==
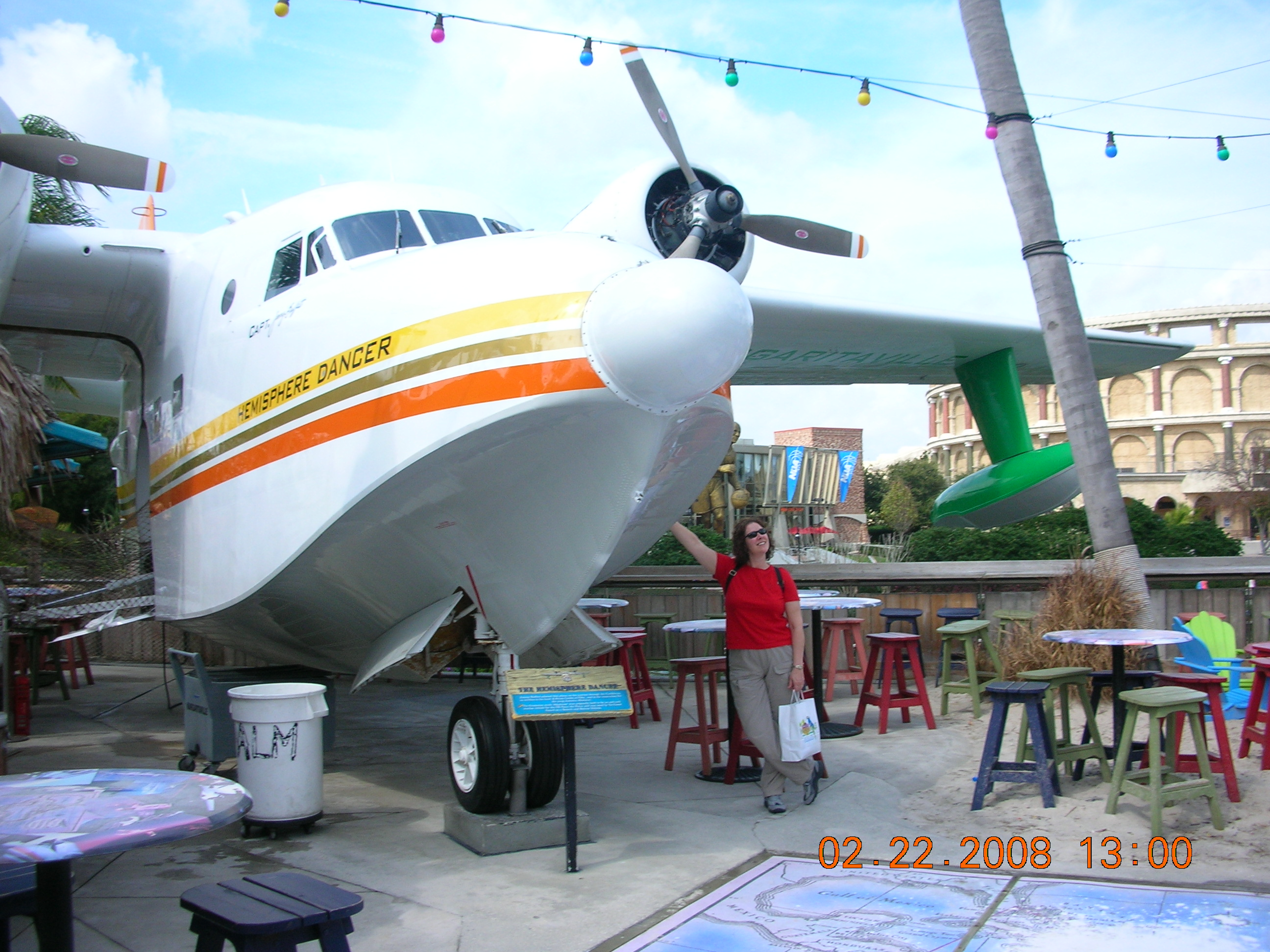
Hemisphere Dancer, photographed at Jimmy Buffett's Margaritaville in Orlando.

On January 16, 1996, Buffett's Grumman HU-16 airplane named Hemisphere Dancer was shot at by Jamaican authorities, while taxiing in the waters near Negril. The Jamaican police believed the craft to be smuggling marijuana, though Buffett claims their main interest for taking the trip was for eating Jamaican-style chicken. The aircraft sustained minimal damage, with only a few bullet holes. The plane had been carrying Buffett, U2 members Adam Clayton and Bono, Bono's wife Ali and their children, Island Records founder Chris Blackwell, and co-pilot Bill Dindy. The Jamaican government acknowledged the mistake and apologized to Buffett.

Bono told the Belfast Telegraph that the experience was terrifying and he thought everyone was going to die. He explains that the authorities had been shooting everywhere, comparing the incident to being in a James Bond movie. The shock of the whole event made Bono cancel the remainder of his family's Jamaican trip, immediately taking them back to Miami, Florida.

Jim Powell, a pilot from Rolling Meadows—who orchestrated virtually all of Buffett's aircraft needs for eight years; and whom Buffett modeled the character Billy Cruise after, from his 1992 best-seller Where Is Joe Merchant?—advised Buffett not to fly over the north coast of Jamaica, due to some concerning weather patterns, as well as a suspicion that the amphibious Grumman Albatross would get unwanted attention. Buffett was not as cautious, so Powell opted to not join the trip. The incident with Jamaican authorities occurred two days later.

== Live appearances ==
Despite not being a concert staple or having an official live album release, "Jamaica Mistaica" is Buffett's most played song out of his 1990s repertoire, having made at least one appearance on each of his annual tours since its release in 1996, except for 2000, 2003 and 2016 tours. Despite the Jamaican government recognizing that the Hemisphere Dancer had not been carrying marijuana and Buffett claiming in the bridge of the song that not even a spliff was present; in some recent performances, Buffett has added the line, "Well, maybe just one!"
