= Joey Issa =

Jamaican businessman

The Honourable Joey Issa CD JP
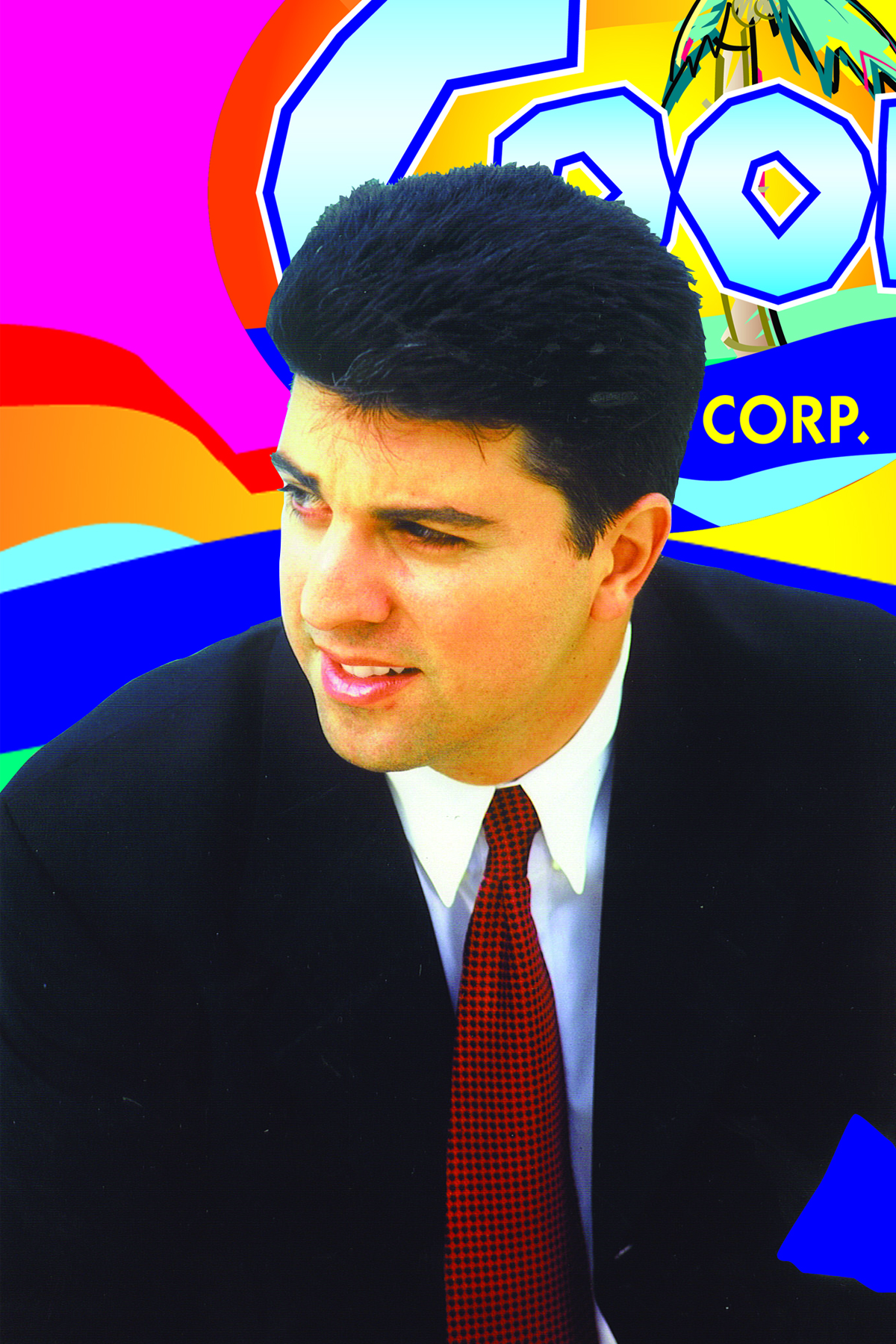
- Issa in 2005

Custos Rotulorum of St. Ann
- Incumbent
- Assumed office 16 September 2024

Personal details
- Born: Joseph John Issa; 1 December 1965 (age 60) Kingston, Jamaica
- Education: College of the Holy Cross (BA); London School of Economics
- Occupation: Businessman; philanthropist

Joseph John Issa (born 1 December 1965) is a Jamaican businessman and philanthropist. He is best known as the founder of Cool Group, which comprises over 50 companies.

At age 30, Issa's first business venture was a petrol station named Cool Oasis, which was the catalyst for the Group becoming the largest Jamaican owned operator of petrol stations in Jamaica. In 2003, he set up a telephone card distribution business called Cool Card. Later, he extended the distribution business to include automotive and household products, among others, under the Cool brand.

Over the next decade, the Cool brand grew rapidly into a group of over 50 companies engaged in a wide variety of activities.

== Early life and education ==
Issa was born in Kingston, Jamaica, to an immigrant family. His father, John Issa, founded SuperClubs Resorts. Issa received his secondary school education at Campion College in Kingston.

In 1985, he became the 11th member of the Issa family to attend the College of the Holy Cross in Worcester, Massachusetts, where he pursued a degree in accounting. As an undergraduate, he became the founder and editor of the Holy Cross Journal of Political Economy in 1988. For one year, he studied at the London School of Economics (LSE) in the United Kingdom, where he became the president of the Afro-Caribbean Society, a multi-ethnic group.

In 1988, Issa graduated from Holy Cross with a Bachelor of Arts, cum laude, as valedictorian with membership in Phi Beta Kappa, Alpha Sigma Nu, and Omicron Delta Epsilon. Upon returning home from college, he joined SuperClubs Resorts, which his father had started in the early 1980s.

== Career ==
Issa started work as the purchasing manager at the Grand Lido Negril in Negril, Jamaica, one of SuperClubs chain of resorts. He became resident manager of the hotel a year later. During the next three years, Issa helped to reorganize the hotel as a resort for romantic vacations and honeymooners.

In 1991, he assumed the position of general manager of Couples Hotel, the first to be established as an all-inclusive by his father in 1978 when Issa was 12 years old. He oversaw the refurbishment of the hotel. Issa was moved to the money-losing Grand Lido San Souci, which he made profitable within six months.

In 1995, Issa was promoted to President of Development and Special Projects in the corporate office, a position in which he was involved in developing the various brands, including the establishment of new properties. He was subsequently promoted to Senior VP of Sales in 1996, and initiated a customer satisfaction program which led to increased bookings and sustained brand loyalty through repeat visits.

In 1999, when Issa became executive vice president, he instituted marketing programmes, including the establishment of a new website to take reservations online 24/7, which led to higher occupancy levels. He remained at the helm of SuperClubs until 2003, when he left to concentrate his own business, the Cool Group of Companies trading as Cool Corp.

== Business ventures ==
In 1994 created a company called Cool Corp, and started by opening a petrol station in Saint Ann's Bay, Jamaica named Cool Oasis. The company grew strategically over the years as Issa engaged in various business ventures.

In 2001, Cool Automotive Distributors was established to deliver motor oil and lubricants to gas stations, auto stores, companies with fleet vehicles and trucking companies. IN 2014, it is one of the leading retailers of automobile-related lubricants and accessories in Jamaica, and also sells basic household products such as toilet paper and soap.

In 2002, Issa formed Cool Card to distribute telephone cards in Jamaica and Trinidad and Tobago, offering phone cards from Jamaica's three cellular phone providers, Digicel, Cable & Wireless and MiPhone, and both cellular providers in Trinidad and Tobago, Digicel and Bmobile. In 2003, he created Cool Biz, and introduced 'EZ Card' an electronic top-up of telephone credit operated by over 3,000 individuals.

In 2005, Issa started Cool Petroleum, which became the licensed user of Shell brands in Jamaica. The company distributed Shell bulk fuels, Shell chemicals and Shell lubricants, and operasted an extensive network of more than 50 Shell service stations.

== Activism ==
Issa also founded a charity, Educate the Children Fund, while at LSE and was active in fundraising to send school books to Caribbean children.

When he returned to Jamaica in 1988, his passion for advocacy did not wane, especially as it relates to a credible social and economic environment, and accountability in governance.

In 2000, Issa participated in media discussions on the impact of the high murder rate on foreign direct investments (FDIs) and economic growth in Jamaica. Issa also commented on the state of the tourism industry, advocating for government support to the small hotel sector and seeking to stem a brewing controversy of variable head tax rates for different cruise ship ports.

In 2001, Issa addressed public concerns about political corruption by suggesting paying politicians more, Issa had based his position on KPMG Peat Marwick figures which showed that politicians earn significantly less than top civil servants and private sector counterparts.

The following year, ahead of the 16 October, general elections, Issa took a stand for accountability in governance with what became known as the "Issa Initiative", calling for those seeking political office sign a pledge with their constituents promising that if elected, they would address two pivotal issues in their constituencies within a reasonable period of time. The idea resonated with people across the country and was supported by the two main political parties: the Jamaica Labour Party and the People's National Party.

Issa represented the island's 13 Chambers of Commerce during negotiations with the government concerning the Cess on street lights, intervening to avoid a threatened protest march.

== Philanthropy ==
In 1987, Issa founded the "Educate the Children Fund" while attending the LSE. The school adopted the program, and the Fund was officially launched by Jamaica's then Acting High Commissioner in London, Dale Anderson. In his remarks, Anderson said Issa's initiative was particularly welcome at a time of scarce resources. A year later, after completing his studies at the College of the Holy Cross and becoming a Certified Public Accountant (CPA), Issa launched the Joe Issa Holy Cross/Jamaica Scholarship Fund, which provided a scholarship to a talented undergraduate Jamaican child once every four years to attend the college. In 1991, while he was working at his parents' SuperClubs Grand Lido Negril resort, Issa launched a cricket and tennis training programme for young children in the parish of Negril.

Issa founded another charity in 2000, "Global Education 2000", to help Jamaican schools by partnering them with their US counterparts. The initiative has resulted in the implementation of various exchange programmes which have benefited several Jamaican schools and were widely reported in the Jamaican media. Also, while, at SuperClubs, Issa helped employees at the resorts to buy and develop land under a project called "People Development Programme".

Since 2003, as Chairman of Cool Corporation, a group of 'Cool' branded companies that cut across many industries, Issa has set up Cool Charities, and has donated hundreds of computers, books, air conditioners and other school-related supplies primarily to educational institutions in the parishes of St. Mary and St. Ann.
