= Negril River =

Negril River may refer to the following rivers in Westmoreland, Jamaica:

- South Negril River
- North Negril River, a river of Jamaica
