= Hedonism Resorts =

Jamaican adults-only resort

Hedonism II
- Location within Jamaica

General information
- Location: Negril, Westmoreland, Jamaica
- Coordinates: 18.337957°N 78.3408558°W
- Opening: 1976
- Operator: Marshmallow Ltd

Technical details
- Floor count: 2

Other information
- Number of rooms: 280
- Number of restaurants: 5

Website
- hedonism.com

Hedonism III
- Location within Jamaica
- Alternative names: SuperFun Beach Resort

General information
- Location: Rutland Point, Westmoreland, Jamaica
- Coordinates: 18.469550°N 77.316365°W
- Opening: 1999
- Closed: 2010 (SuperFun Beach Resort in 2011)
- Owner: Harry W. Lange
- Operator: PB & J Resorts

Technical details
- Floor count: 2

Other information
- Number of rooms: 280
- Number of suites: 15
- Parking: Yes

Hedonism II is an adults-only vacation resort in Jamaica known for its sexually liberal culture. It occupies 22 acres (89,000 m^{2}) at the northern end of Negril beach and has 280 rooms in two-story buildings. There was never a Hedonism I. Hedonism III opened in 1999 and closed in 2010.

== History ==
Hedonism II was opened as Negril Beach Village in 1976. Owned by SuperClubs, a resort company founded by businessman John Issa, it was renamed Hedonism II in 1981. On 26 February 2013, it was sold to Marshmallow Ltd., headed by financier Harry Lange. The Issa family and Kevin Levee, a 28-year employee of SuperClubs, held minority stakes.

Hedonism III opened in 1999 in Runaway Bay, constructed on 10 acres (40,000 m^{2}) and containing 225 rooms in 3-story buildings. In August 2010, it was closed temporarily to allow for remodeling work. It reopened on 14 October 2010, as SuperFun Beach Resort and Spa, catering to a wider market through additional tour operators. However, the establishment entered receivership in March 2011 and closed in June. While it was an adult-only resort, SuperFun did not allow topless or nude sunbathing. The property was leased to SuperClubs by the Development Bank of Jamaica, while the hotel's first-ranked secured lenders were Caribbean Development Bank, PanCaribbean, and the Development Bank of Jamaica itself.

In July 2020, a cannabis dispensary, Hedo Weedo, was opened inside Hedonism II as the first such legal and regulated establishment in Jamaica.

== Hedo Weedo ==
Hedo Weedo
- Industry: Cannabis
- Founded: 1 July 2020; 6 years ago
- Headquarters: Negril, Jamaica
- Number of locations: 1
- Key people: Kevin Levee; Harry Lange
- Products: Medical cannabis; Recreational cannabis
- Website: hedoweedo.com

Hedo Weedo is a cannabis shop located inside Hedonism II. It is known as the first legal and regulated cannabis dispensary in the country.

Hedo Weedo was founded by Richard 'Kevin' Levee and Harry Lange and opened in July 2020, following the revival of the Jamaican tourism industry post-COVID-19. According to Levee, the process to acquire licensing had begun five years before the opening.

== In popular culture ==
- In the 2006 "Dwight's Speech" episode of The Office, Kevin Malone suggests that Jim Halpert go to Hedonism for a vacation. He describes it as "like Club Med, but everything is naked".
- In 2010, comedian Daniel Tosh of Tosh.0 lampooned the antics of "Hedo Rick" in a viral video that featured an aging patron of Hedonism II parading in a speedo and promoting the wild women and sexual nature of the resort.
- A travel/humor book about the resort, titled The Naked Truth About Hedonism II, by Chris Santilli, was published in its third edition in December 2019.
- Films loosely based on Hedonism resorts include Hangin' in Hedo (2008), starring Sherman Hemsley, and The Swing of Things (2020).

== See also ==
- List of hotels in Jamaica
- Love hotel
