= Tensing Pen Resort =

Coordinates: 18.2557°N 78.3649°W

- Industry: Resort
- Founded: 1970s
- Headquarters: Negril, Jamaica
- Area served: Jamaica
- Owner: Sam Petros
- Number of employees: 30–50
- Website: Tensing Pen

Tensing Pen Resort is located on the western tip of Jamaica in the town of Negril. It was founded in the early 1970s as a haven and retreat for young couples. In 1975, it was purchased by Karin and Richard Murray.

The Murrays sold the property in 1990, and it was subsequently purchased by Sam Petros in late 1992, who brought the Murrays back as partners. After the passing of Richard Murray in December 2016, Sam Petros became the sole owner of Tensing Pen Resort in March, 2017.

Over the years, Tensing Pen has become a small boutique resort known for honeymooners and destination weddings in Negril, Jamaica. It has also been referenced as a resort for singles due to the variety of activities and amenities available.

== History of Tensing Pen ==
Tensing Pen heralds its unique name from the former owners' (Stephen & Nicola Quinto) dog, Tensing. Tensing was found penned up when the former owners first rescued him, thus creating the name Tensing Pen. After Tensing Pen was purchased by the Murray's, intense landscaping and renovations began shortly in order to create the beginning shape of the resort.

After its repurchase by Sam Petros, further landscape work and new cottages were added. In 2004, Hurricane Ivan cleared the way to add a restaurant, a bar, an organic swimming pool and a spa area, resulting in the resort that is standing today.

In September 2010, another renovation was completed, including the new thatched roofs and furnishings. The South House was also converted into the 2 bedroom 2 story cottage it is today.

In 2012, Tensing Pen was hit by the tremendous Hurricane Sandy that affected many islands in the Caribbean, including Jamaica .

Unlike most resorts who offer easy access to typical electronics such as TV, wi-fi, and telephones, Tensing Pen's cottages and bungalows do not include any phones or electronics normally found in a resort. Wi-fi, telephone service, and other amenities are available at the front desk.

== Activities at Tensing Pen ==
=== Snorkeling ===
Snorkeling is a common activity at Tensing Pen. The water is very clear and there are multiple areas and depths in which to swim and snorkel by the resort. There are a variety of species of fishes including the Parrot Fish, Puffer Fish, and other marine animals like Stingrays that are native to the Caribbean Sea.

=== Beaches ===
Tensing Pen is located along Jamaica's famous seven mile beach, which is Jamaica's longest and most pristine beaches. Tensing Pen Resort is located on cliffs next the Caribbean, offering more privacy for visitors.

=== Scuba Diving ===
Scuba Diving is another common activity at Tensing Pen Resort and the surrounding Negril area.

== Rooms ==
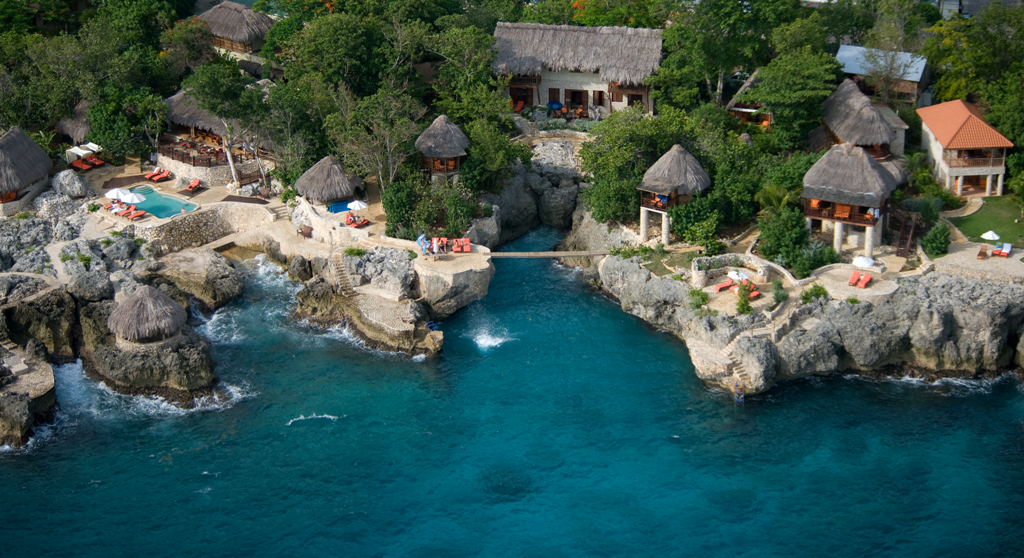
Aerial view of the Tensing Pen Resort

Tensing Pen Resort has a total of 17 thatch and stone cottages spread around the resort. Cottages and Bungalows are available on seaside cliffs, in the gardens, or further back with an ocean view.
