= Westmoreland Parish =

Parish of Jamaica

Coordinates: 18°14′N 78°09′W

Westmoreland Wesmolan
- Parish
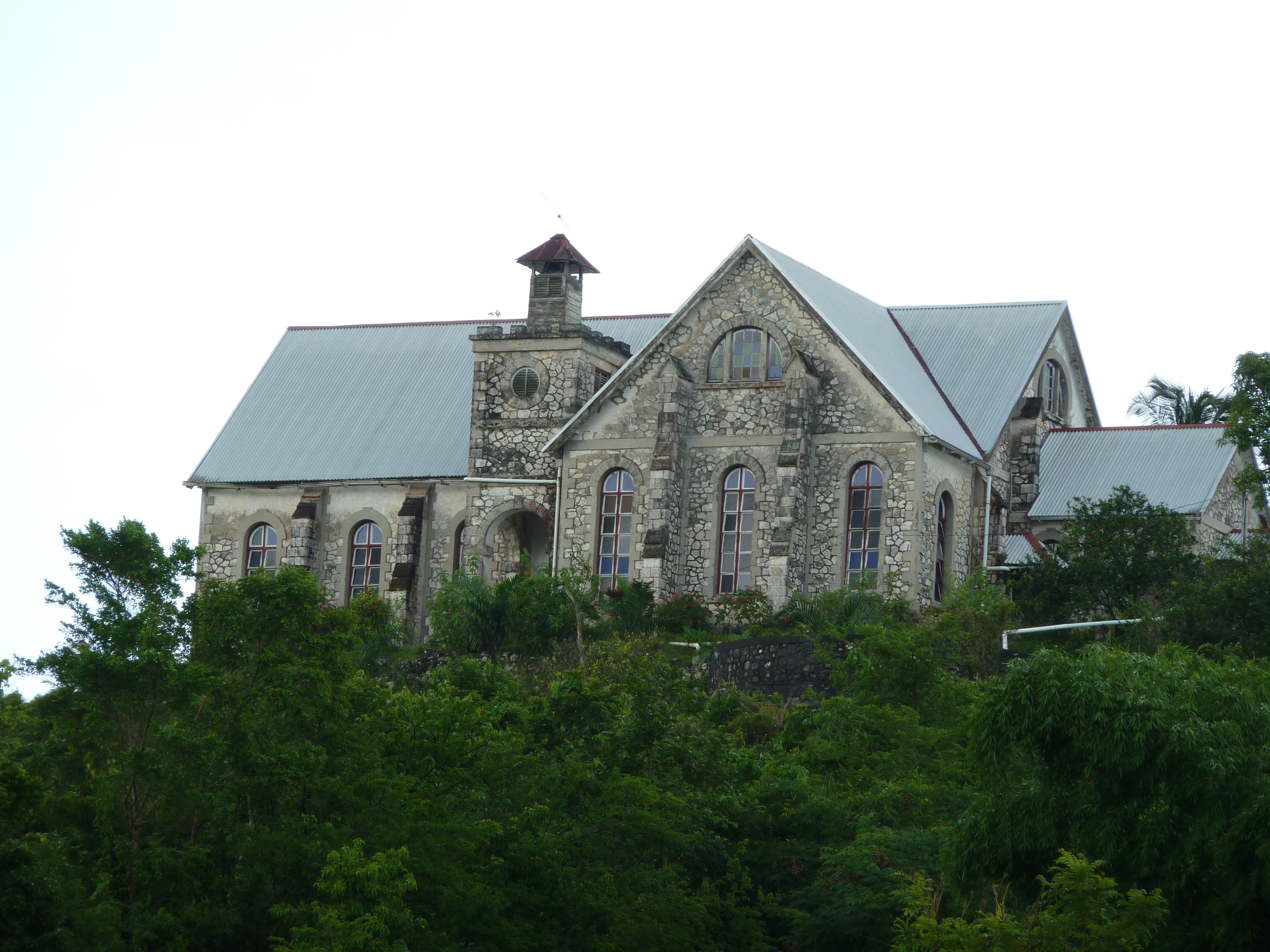
- Carmel Moravian Church

- Westmoreland in Jamaica
- Country: Jamaica
- County: Cornwall
- Capital: Savanna-la-Mar

Area
  - Total: 807 km^{2} (312 sq mi)
  - Rank: 8

Population (2019)
  - Total: 149,857
  - Density: 186/km^{2} (481/sq mi)
- Demonym: Westmorelanded

Westmoreland (Jamaican Patois: Wesmolan) is the westernmost parish in Jamaica, on the south side of the island. It lies south of Hanover, southwest of Saint James, and northwest of Saint Elizabeth, in the county of Cornwall. The chief town and capital is Savanna-la-Mar. Negril, a famous tourist destination, is also situated in the parish.

== History ==
The earliest inhabitants of Westmoreland were the Arawak and Ciboney peoples. The Ciboney were first to arrive, from the coast of South America, around 500 BC. Known as "cave dwellers", they lived along the cliffs of Negril. The labyrinth of caves and passageways beneath what is now the Xtabi Hotel in Negril are one of the first known settlements of Ciboney Indians in Jamaica.

Christopher Columbus stopped at what became Westmoreland on his second voyage when he landed in Jamaica. One of the first Spanish settlements was also built at present-day Bluefields in this parish.

The English took over the island from Spanish rule in 1655. Colonists named the parish Westmoreland in 1703, for it was the most westerly point of the island. In 1730, Savanna-la-Mar, a coastal port, was designated to replace Banbury as the capital of the parish. A fort was built in the 1700s to defend the port against pirates. Today, it is one of the historic sites of the parish.

In the mid-18th century, Westmoreland was, acre for acre, one of the most profitable territories, not only in Jamaica, but throughout the British empire. The plains of Westmoreland were densely populated with sugar plantations, and by the time of Tacky's War, Westmoreland had about 15,000 slaves labouring on more than 60 sugar plantations, many of them owned by leading men of the island, such as William Beckford and Arthur Forrest.

The name Westmoreland appears to stem from Dr John Drummond (1744–1804), who had several plantations on the island (foremost being the Drummond Estate) and vast lands at Savanna-la-Mar, which had been owned by his parents. He was surgeon to the Westmoreland Regiment of Foot from 1784. This British regiment was officially on the island from 1802 to 1813, but the name appears to pre-date this, for John Drummond refers to his "Westmoreland estate" in his will of 1793.

In 1938, riots at the Frome sugar estate changed the course of Jamaica's history. In the wake of these riots, the legislature passed legislation for universal adult suffrage in 1944, as well as a new constitution, which was approved by the Crown. This put Jamaica on the road to self-government and eventually, independence. The two national heroes, Sir Alexander Bustamante and Norman Washington Manley, emerged as political leaders during this time.

On 28 October 2025, Hurricane Melissa made landfall near New Hope in the Parish at its peak intensity as a Category 5 hurricane, making it by far the strongest hurricane to ever strike the island (surpassing Hurricane Gilbert which made landfall in eastern Jamaica as a low-end Category 4 hurricane in 1988), tying the 1935 Labor Day hurricane as the third-most-intense Atlantic hurricane on record.

== Geography ==
Westmoreland has an area of 807 square kilometres (312 sq mi), making it Jamaica's eighth-largest parish. Westmoreland's population of 144,817 is made up of a large percentage of ethnic East Indians, descendants of indentured laborers who came to Jamaica from India to work after Britain abolished slavery in 1834 and the demand for labor remained high. Many intermarried with people of African descent, and their multi-racial descendants are known locally as "half indian".

There are over 40 square kilometres (10,000 acres) of morass land, the largest part of which is called the Great Morass. This contains plant and animal material collected over centuries. The morass can be mined as peat, an excellent source of energy. The marsh serves as a natural and unique sanctuary for a wide variety of Jamaican wildlife and birds. The remaining area consists of several hills of moderate elevation, and alluvial plains along the coast.

Numerous rivers run through the parish. The Cabaritta River, which is 39.7 km (24.7 mi) long, drains the George's Plain and can accommodate ships weighing up to eight tons. Other rivers include the Negril, New Savanna, Morgan's, Gut, Smithfield, Bowens, Bluefields, Robins, Roaring, Great and Dean.

The westernmost tip of the island, Negril Point, is the site of the Negril Lighthouse.

== Education ==
Westmoreland is home to several secondary schools, including Manning's School, Frome Technical High School, Grange Hill High School, and others.

== Commerce ==
As a result of the fertile plains, the parish thrives on agriculture, mainly sugarcane, which offers direct employment. Other agricultural products include bananas, coffee, ginger, cocoa, pimento, honey, rice, and breadfruit. Pastoralism is also practised; the rearing of cattle, horses, and mules, as well as fishing—there are 19 fishing beaches with over 90 boats engaged in the industry. Manufacturing is the third largest sector. Manufactured items include food and drink, tobacco, animal feeds, textile and textile products.

Negril is one of the main tourist destinations in Jamaica. Since the 1950s, tourism has been the fastest-growing sector. The major hotels are Couples Swept Away (the northern half of which is technically in Hanover), Poinciana Beach Resort and Negril Beach Club.

== Notable Cultural Figures from the Parish ==
- Bim Sherman, (12 February 1950 – 17 November 2000) international Roots Reggae artist, singer, musician.

Attractions

- Bridgewater
- Mayfield Falls
- Negril
- Petersfield
- Roaring River Park
- Savanna-la-Mar
- Seaford Town

== See also ==
Mount Charles, a large hill in Westmoreland Parish.

== Notes and references ==
Notes

References

- Political Geography of Jamaica
