= Negril =

- Beach Resort
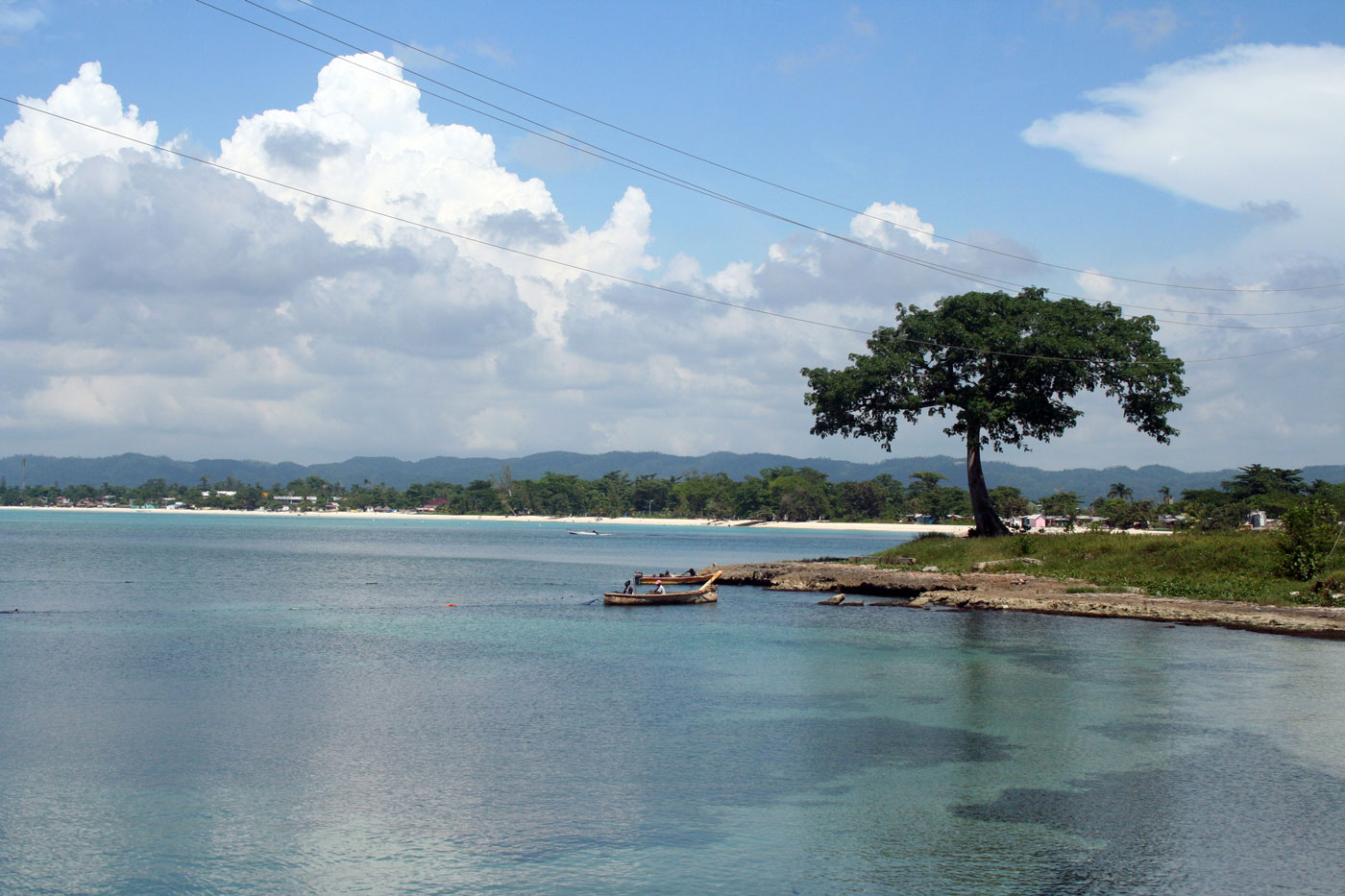
- Negril coastline, with its famous beach in the background.

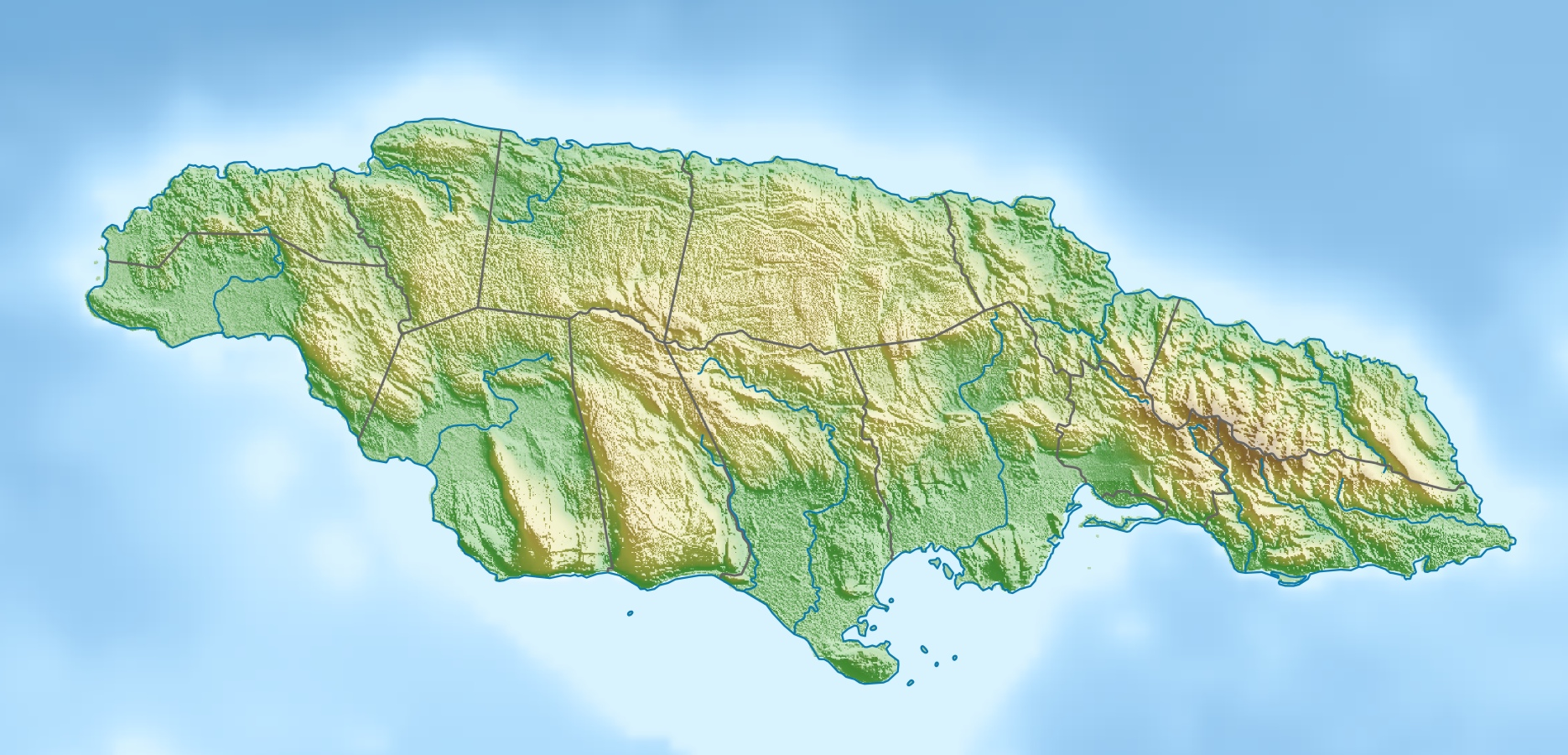
- Location within Jamaica
- Coordinates: 18.3110182°N 78.339386°Wa
- Country: Jamaica
- Parish: Westmoreland Parish and Hanover Parish
- Time zone: UTC-5 (EST)

Negril is a small, widely dispersed beach resort and town located in Westmoreland and Hanover parishes at the far western part of Jamaica, 80.8 kilometres (50.2 mi) southwest from Sangster International Airport in Montego Bay.

Westmoreland is the westernmost parish in Jamaica, located on the south side of the island. Downtown Negril, the West End cliff resorts to the south of downtown, and the southern portion of the so-called seven miles (11 km) beach are in Westmoreland Parish. The northernmost resorts are along the Negril Beach and are nearer if not across the border where Westmoreland Parish meets the Hanover Parish. The nearest large town is Savanna-la-Mar, the capital of Westmoreland Parish if traveling South West. Whereas going in the opposite direction along the A1 highway is Lucea, the Capital Town of Hanover.

== History ==
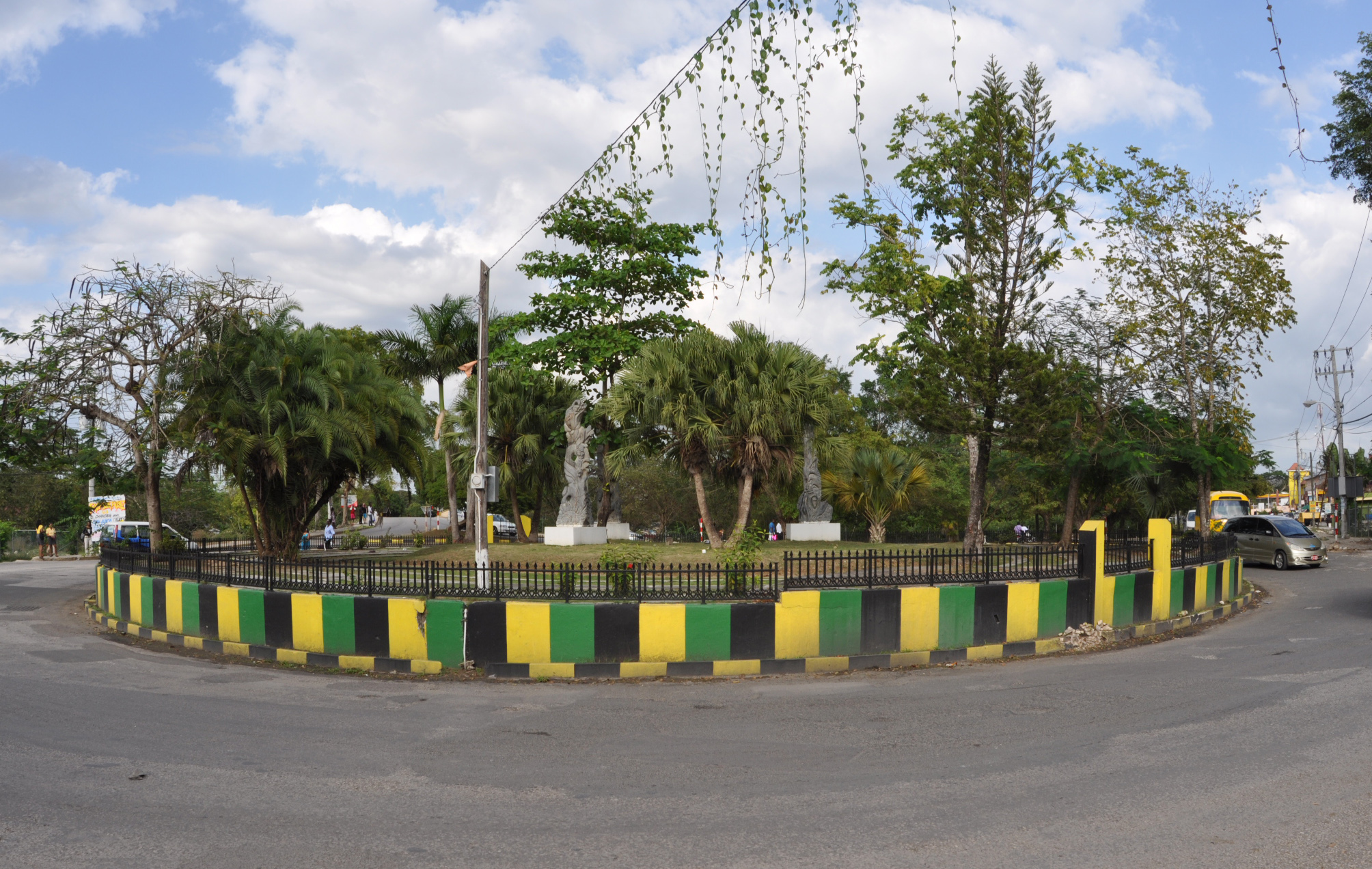
Negril Town Center

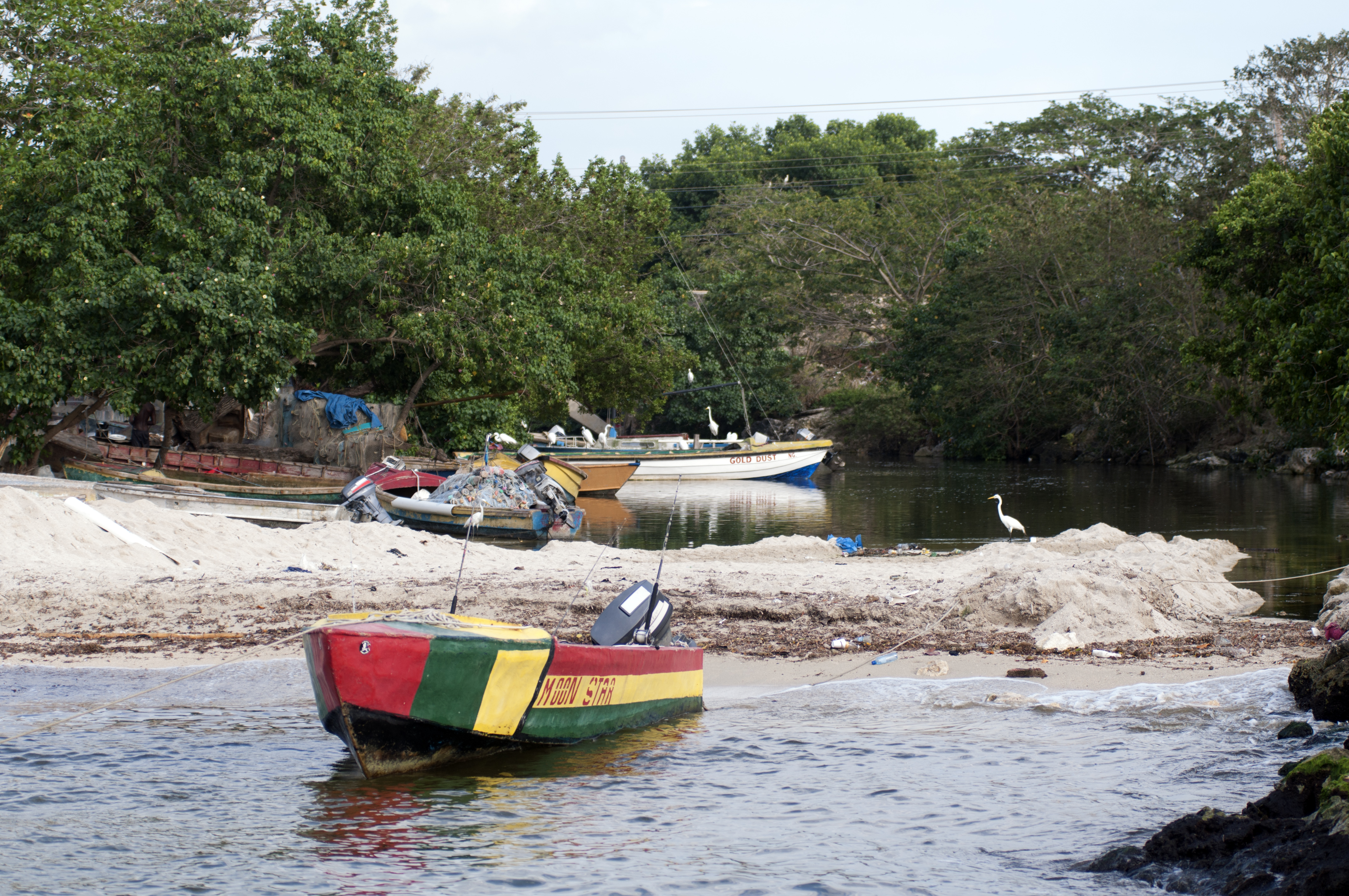
Negril fishing boats

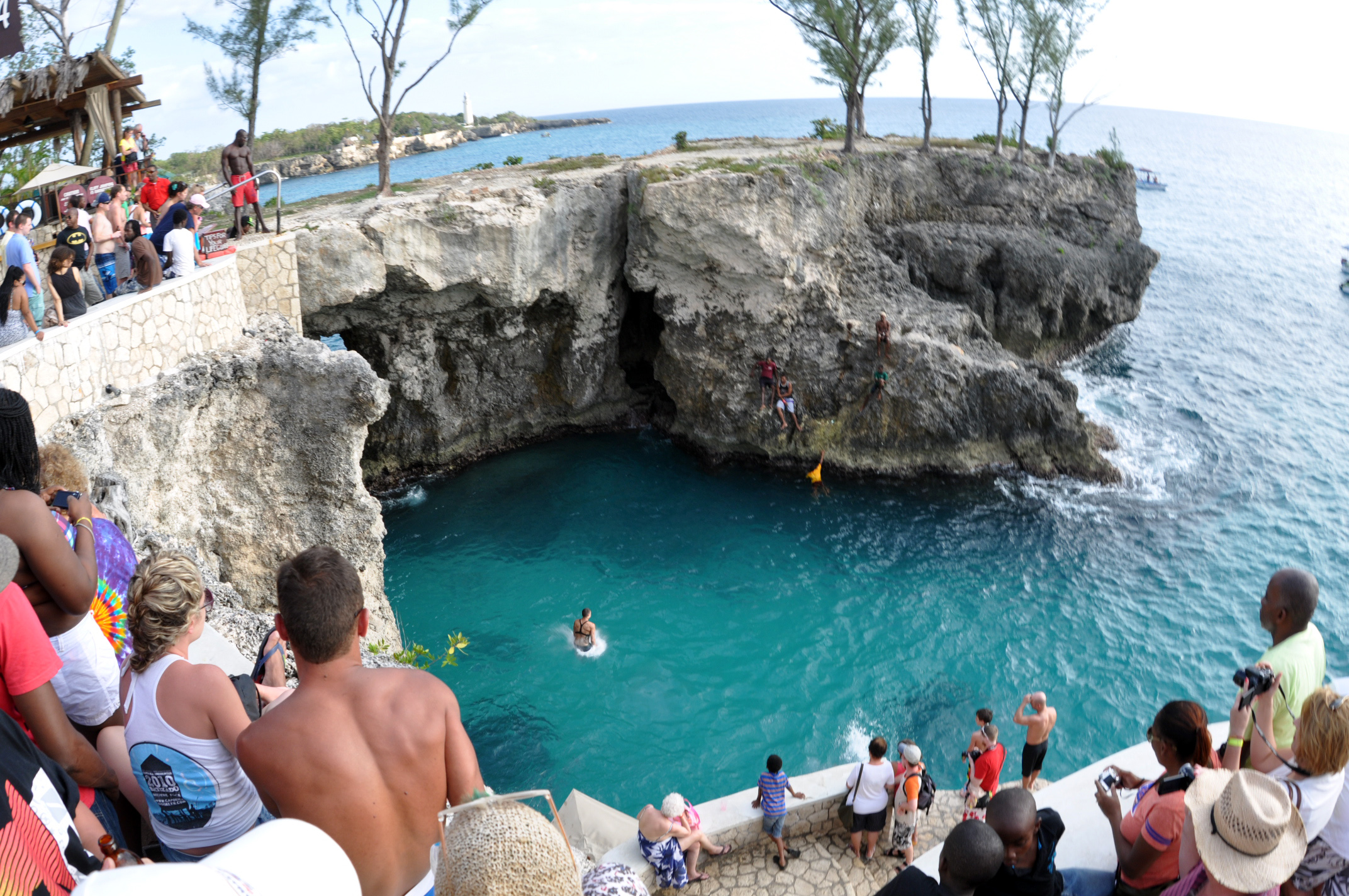
Cliff jumper at Ricks in Negril

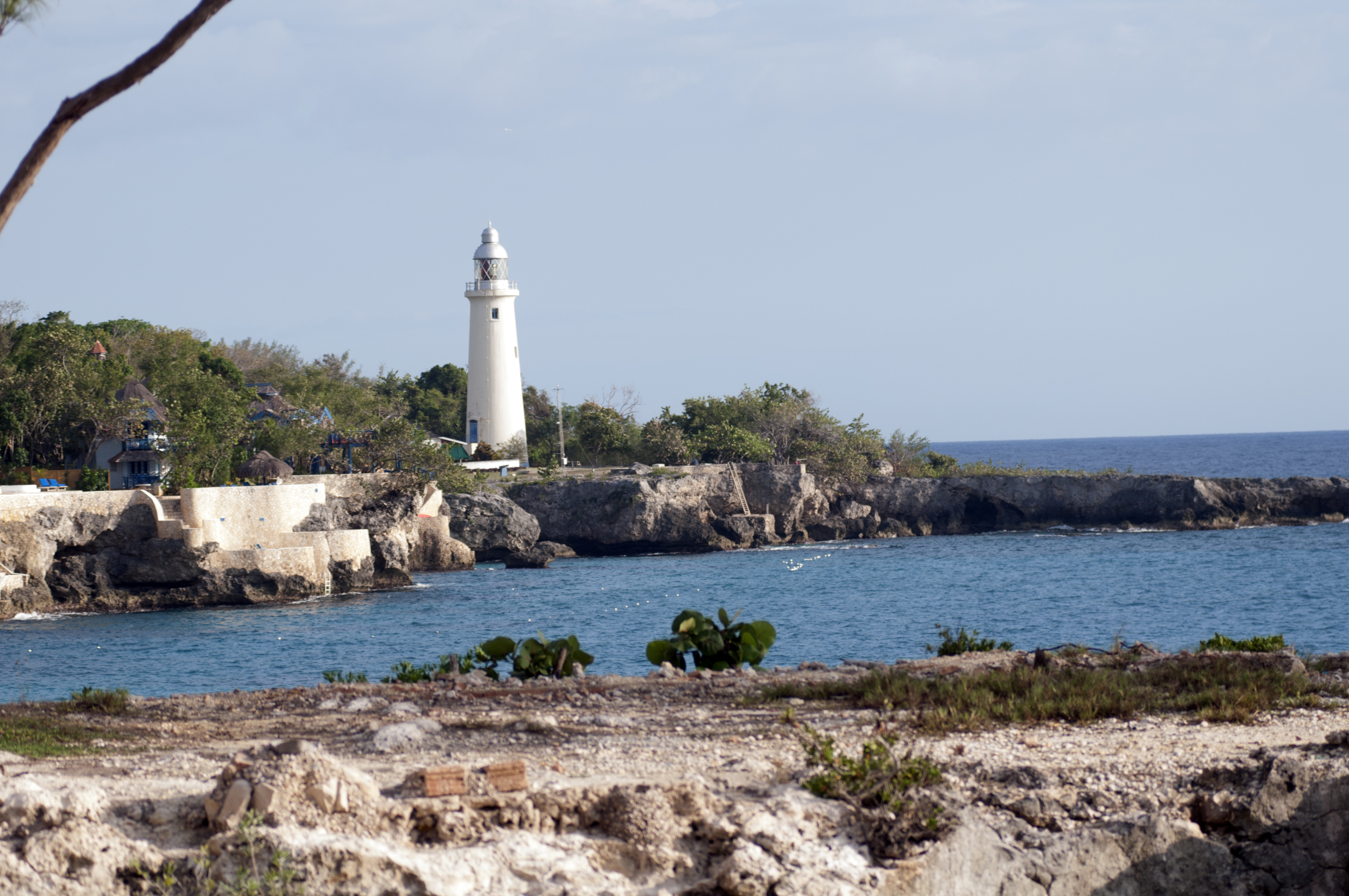
Negril Lighthouse

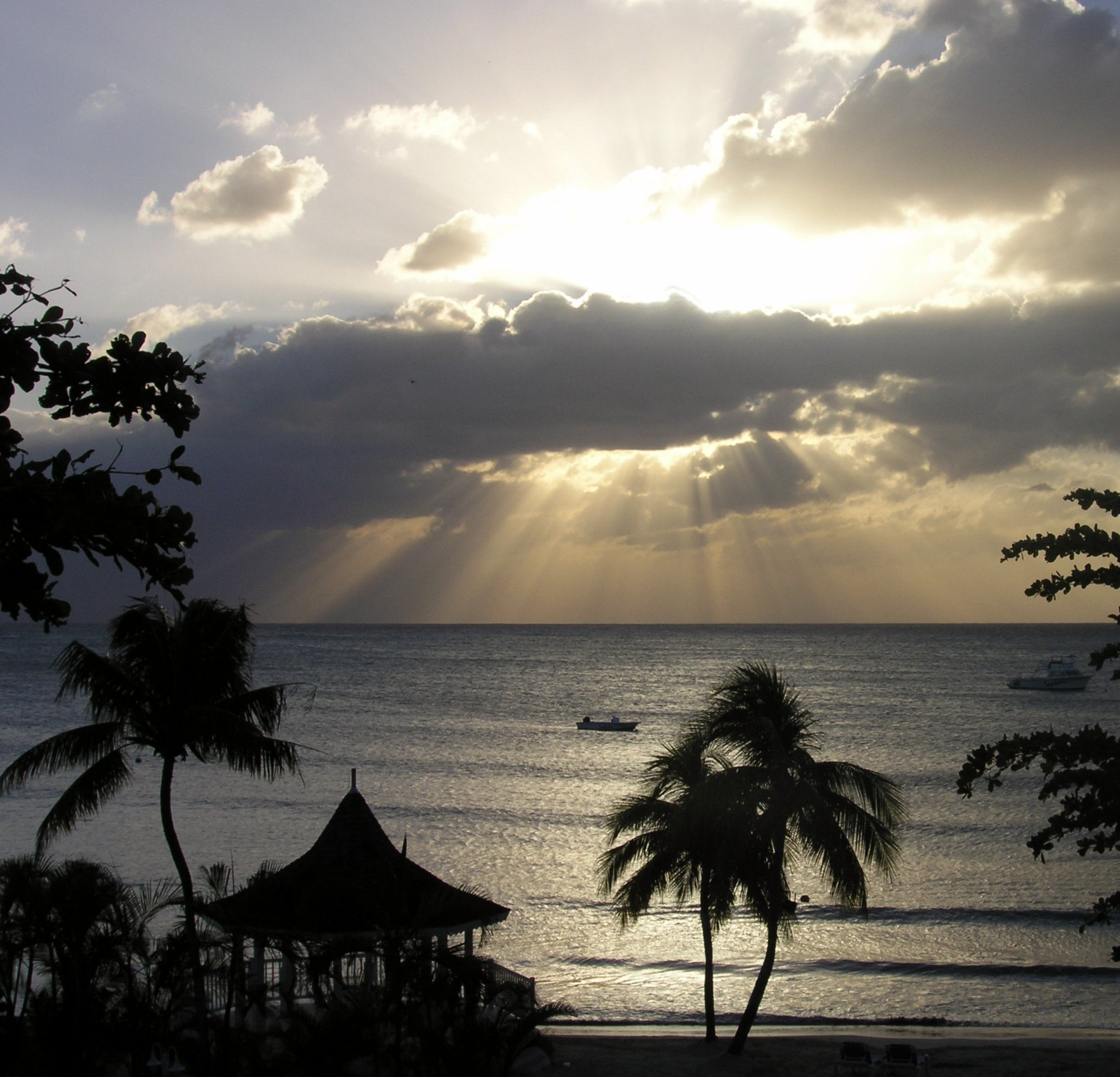
Sunset at Sandals resort in Negril

=== Spanish colonialism ===
The name Negril is a shortened version of Negrillo (Spanish: Little black one), as it was originally named by the Spaniards in 1494. A theory holds that because there was a vast population of black eels along Negril's coast, the Spaniards called the area Anguila Negra, which was shortened to Negrillo and then to Negril.

=== 20th century ===
Negril's development as a resort location began during the late 1950s, though access to the area proved difficult as ferries were required to drop off passengers in Negril Bay, forcing them to wade to shore. Most vacationers would rent rooms inside the homes of Jamaican families, or would pitch tents in their yards. Daniel Connell was the first person to create more conventional vacation lodging for these "flower children" when he set up the first guest house in Negril - Palm Grove. The area's welcoming and hospitable reputation grew over time and the first of many resorts was constructed in the mid to late 1960s. The first hotel in Negril was the Yacht Club by Mary's Bay on the West End.

When the road between Montego Bay and Negril was improved in the early 1970s, it helped to increase Negril's status as a new resort location. It was a two-lane paved road that ran approximately 100 yards (91 m) inland from two white coral sand beaches, at the southern end of which was a small village. The long paved road from the village ran north to Green Island, home to many of the Jamaican workers in Negril, and was straight enough to double as a runway for small airplanes. Lengths of railroad track stand on end along the side of the road to discourage drug smugglers from landing on the road to pick up cheap cargos of marijuana.

After Negril's infrastructure was expanded—anticipating the growth of resorts and an expanding population, a small airport, the Negril Aerodrome, was built in 1976 near Rutland Point, alongside several small hotels mostly catering to the North American winter tourists. Europeans also came to Negril, and several hotels were built to cater directly to those guests.

For years, Negril's beach was rated as one of the top ten beaches in the world by several travel magazines. The beach's length is significant — the two bays (Bloody Bay to the north, and Long Bay to the south) comprise the Seven Mile Beach. The beach is actually roughly 7 miles in length, with Bloody Bay being around 2 miles, and Long Bay being just under 5 miles. Bloody Bay is home to the large, all-inclusive resorts, and Long Bay has all-inclusives and smaller, family-run hotels.

South of downtown Negril is West End Road, known as the West End, which is lined with resorts that offer more privacy. These areas have access to waters used for snorkelling and diving, with jumping points reaching more than 40 feet (12 m) high.

Many vendors and shops are located around the beach resorts; however, they are predominantly located on the south end of the beach, where there are fewer all-inclusive resorts.

A new highway from Montego Bay and an improved infrastructure may bring more tourists. As a result, more hotels and tour operators continue to develop new attractions and excursions in Negril. Since the 1980s, it has also become a popular location for U.S. college students to visit during spring break, or just a regular vacation in Jamaica.

There has been development along the beach. The resorts include Couples Swept Away, Couples Negril, Sandals, Beaches, Samsara Hotel, Legends Resort, the Grand Lido, Riu Palace Tropical Bay, Riu Club Hotel, and Hedonism II.

A franchise of Jimmy Buffett's chain restaurant and bar, Jimmy Buffett's Margaritaville, and a duty-free zone have also been added. Currently under construction is the new Royalton Negril Resort.

In recent years, a large development has been constructed consisting of ocean front villas, 2 or 3 bed townhouse developments and studio apartments. This development is known as Little Bay Country Club and is home to some of the wealthiest Jamaican families.

The Reggae Marathon has been held yearly in Negril since 2001.

In April 2023, the government of Jamaica, announced its plans to build an international airport in Negril. Edmund Bartlett, the Minister of Tourism of Jamaica said that Negril, being a major tourist destination, needs resources and that the town will see development in the new fiscal year. Bartlett said that the development would include an international airport, a public beach park, and a craft village.

== Geography and ecology ==
The geography of Jamaica is diverse. The western coastline contains the island's finest beaches, stretching for more than 6 km (3.7 mi) along a sandbar at Negril. It is sometimes known among tourists as the "7-Mile Beach" although it is only slightly more than 4 mi (6.4 km) in length, from the Negril River on the south to Rutland Point on the north.

On the inland side of Negril's main road, to the east of the shore, lies a swamp called the Great Morass, through which runs the Negril River. Within the Great Morass is the Royal Palm Reserve, with protected wetlands and forest.

In 1990, the Negril Coral Reef Preservation Society was formed as a non-profit, non-governmental organization to address ongoing degradation of the ecosystem of coral reefs. The Negril Marine Park was officially declared on 4 March 1998 covering a total area of approximately 160 km^{2} (62 sq mi) and extending from the Davis Cove River in the Parish of Hanover to St. John's Point in Westmoreland.

Scuba diving and snorkeling are especially good in the protected reef areas.

The West End Road is also known as Lighthouse Road as there is a Belgian engineered lighthouse protecting seafarers from the cliffs. There are views from this western tip of Negril, near Negril Lighthouse.

== Popular culture and media references ==
- Negril is featured in Ian Fleming's 1965 novel The Man with the Golden Gun. One of the schemes of the novel's antagonist Francisco Scaramanga was to open a hotel called "Thunderbird" on a Negril beach.
- Negril is mentioned in the lyrics of the 1976 Bob Seger song "Sunspot Baby", which is the first song on the second side of the album Night Moves.
- Negril is mentioned in lyrics of the 1996 Jimmy Buffett song "Jamaica Mistaica", which is the second song on the album Banana Wind.
- Negril is mentioned in the 2008 Mad Men episode "The Jet Set"' (Season Two, Episode 11), which appeared on AMC.

== Resorts ==
- Beaches Resorts - Negril
- Couples Negril
- Couples Swept Away
- Grand Lido
- GreenLeaf Cabins Resort
- Hedonism II
- Little Bay Country Club (LBCC)
- Royalton Negril
- Sandals Negril
- One Retreats

== Notable people ==
- Owen Beck, Jamaican heavyweight boxer
- B. Denham Jolly, Jamaican-Canadian businessman and human rights activist
- Joel Augustus Rogers, Jamaican author and Africa historian

== See also ==
- List of beaches in Jamaica
