= Mount Charles, Jamaica =

Hill in Jamaica

Mount Charles
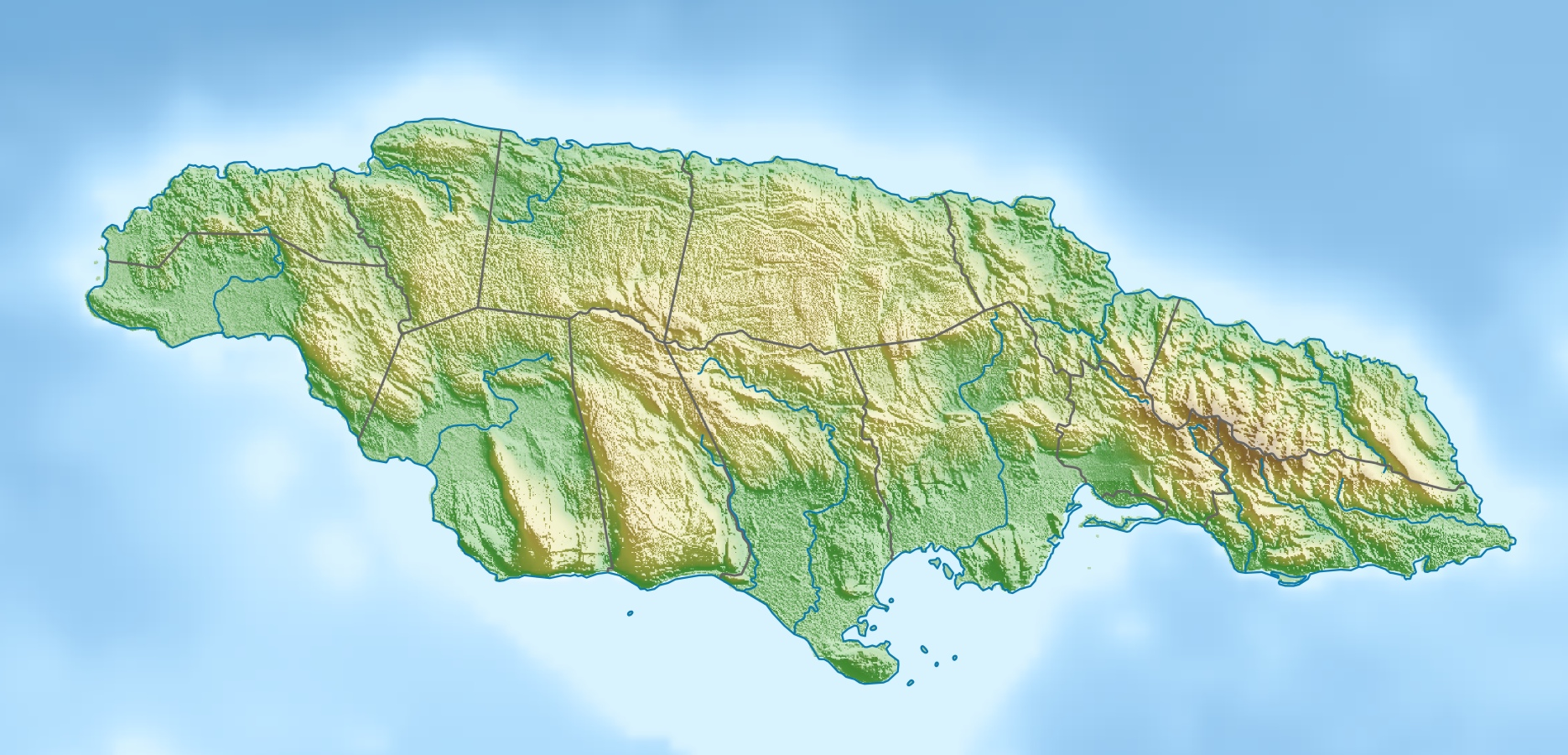
- Location within Jamaica

Highest point
- Elevation: 114 m (374 ft)
- Coordinates: 18°11′N 78°02′W

Geography
- Location: St Elizabeth, Jamaica

Mount Charles is a 114-metre (374 ft) high hill in St Elizabeth, Westmoreland Parish, Jamaica.
