= Savanna-la-Mar =

Coordinates: 18°13′N 78°08′W

Savanna-la-Mar Sav-la-Mar
- Parish Capital
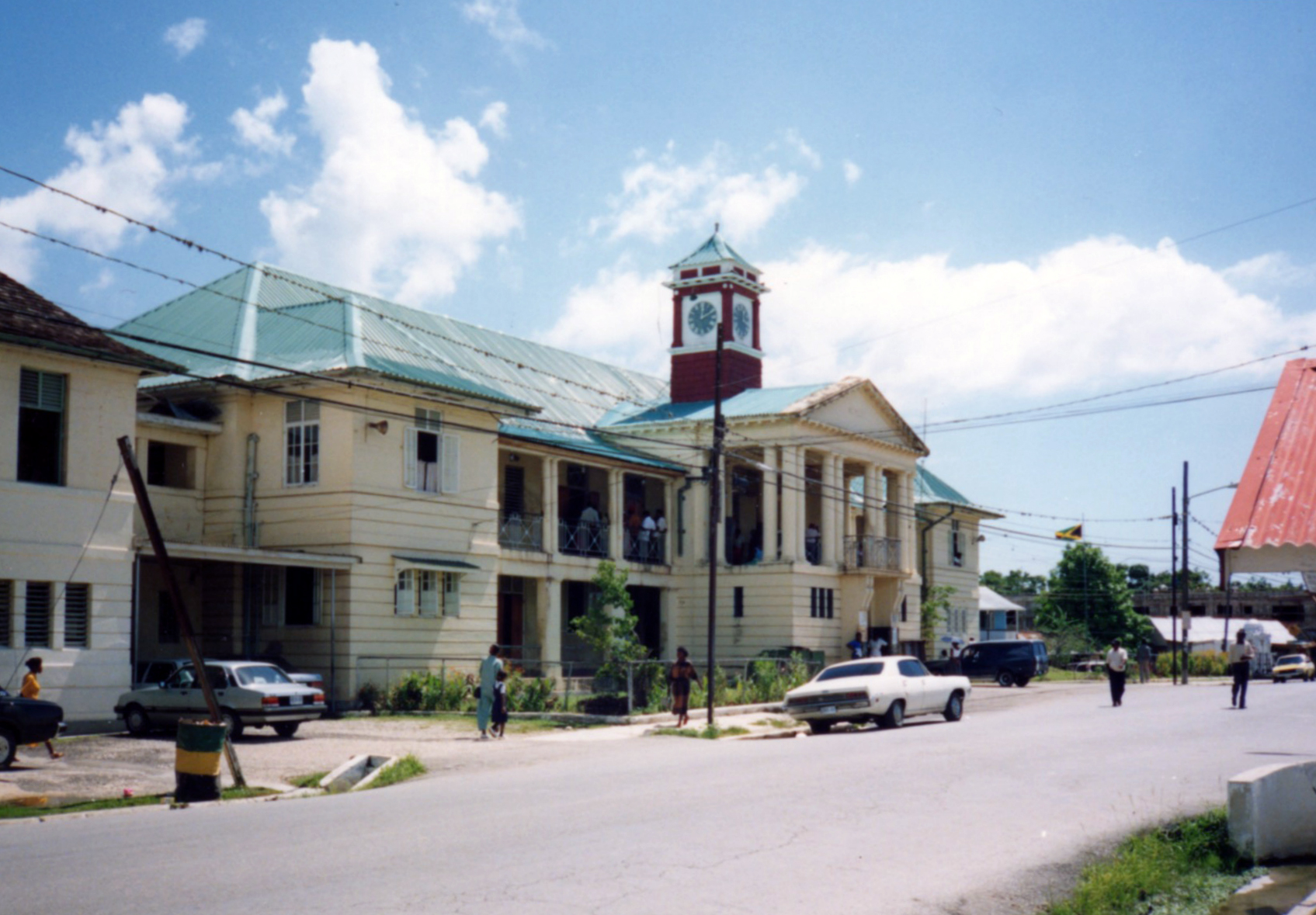
- Westmoreland Parish Court House
- Nickname: Sav-la-Mar
- Location within Jamaica
- Country: Jamaica
- County: Cornwall
- Parish: Westmoreland

Government
  - Mayor: Bertel Moore

Population
  - Estimate (2011): 22,600
- Time zone: UTC-5 (EST)

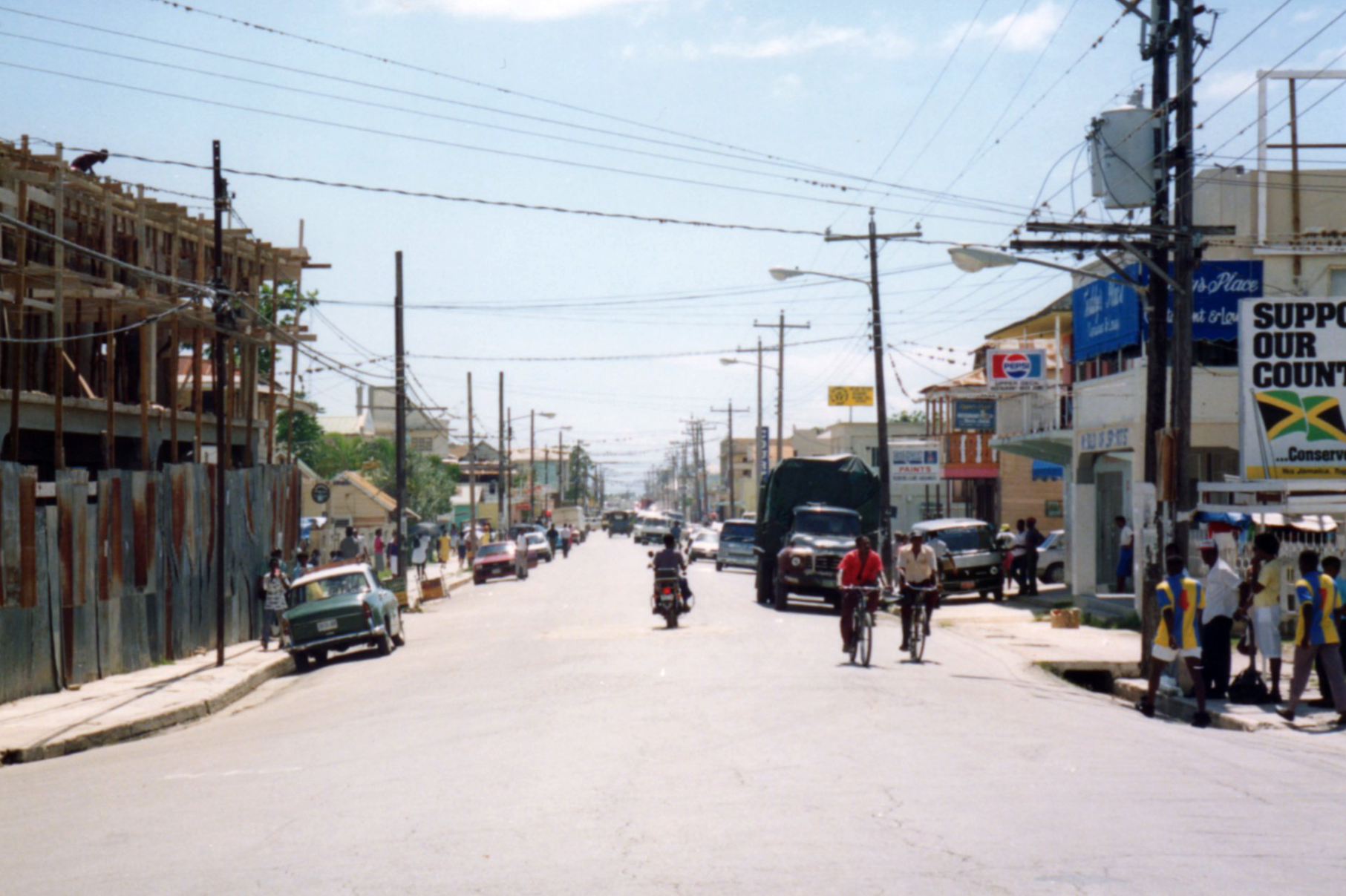
Great George Street

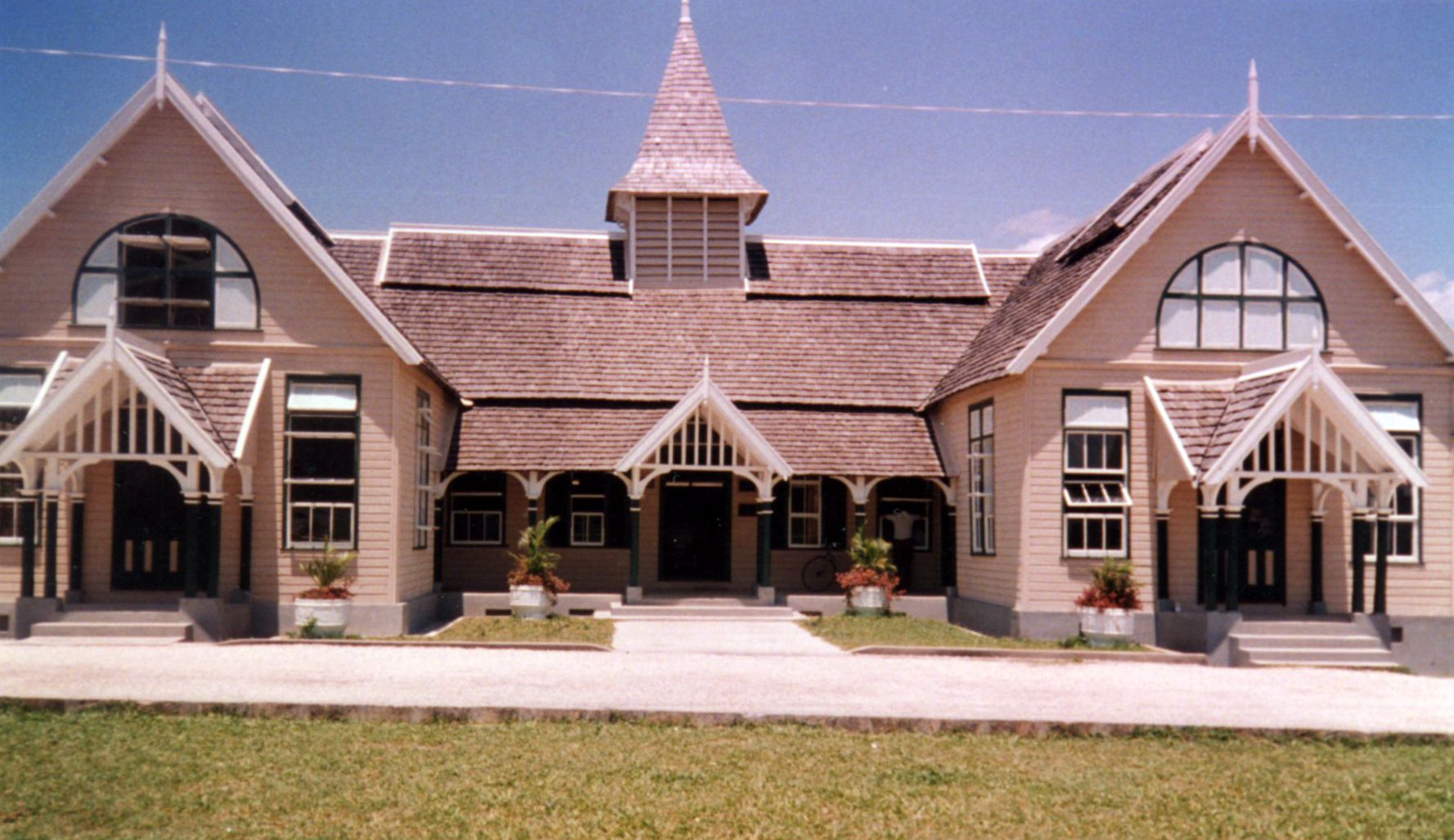
Manning's High School

Savanna-la-Mar (commonly known as Sav-la-Mar, or simply Sav) is the chief town and capital of Westmoreland Parish, Jamaica. A coastal town, it contains an 18th-century fort constructed for colonial defence against pirates in the Caribbean.

== History ==
Savanna-la-Mar was originally established as a settlement in Spanish Jamaica.

In 1780, the town was completely destroyed by a powerful hurricane known as Savanna-la-Mar hurricane. It was rebuilt, as the port was important to the Atlantic slave trade as well as the sugar trade.

After Great Britain abolished slavery in 1833 and before the abolition of slavery in the United States in 1865, officials of the Caribbean colonies would sometimes order the examination of slaves who were held captive on American ships that came to Britain's Caribbean ports. They were given the choice to stay in the colony and work to gain their freedom, or remain captive on the ship sailing to the United States. In the cases of the Enterprise at Bermuda in 1835 and the Creole at Nassau in 1841–1842, a total of more than 200 enslaved people gained freedom (by means unknown).

In at least one case, residents intervened and put themselves at risk to help others gain freedom. On 20 July 1855, Jamaicans boarded the United States brig Young America, which had put into Savann-la-Mar. They had learned that the cook, a man named Anderson (alias Nettles) had escaped slavery and therefore was considered to be a fugitive. They took him to shore, where he managed to gain freedom. (He boarded the ship with free papers in the name of Nettles.) The Jamaican magistrates did not interfere. The United States consul, R. Monroe Harrison (1768–1858), complained to the British colonial government about the incident. He also published a letter in The New York Times a few days later warning shipmasters against having blacks as part of their crew on ships putting into Jamaica, at the risk of losing them.

== Notable people ==
- C. B. Bucknor – Major League Baseball umpire
- Ronnie Davis – singer, songwriter, performer
- Des Drummond – Rugby League player
- John Drummond (1744–1804) – surgeon and plantation owner
- John Dunkley – painter
- Asani Samuels – Professional footballer
- Sevana – singer
- Laken Tomlinson – American football player
