= Couples Resorts =

Resort in Jamaica

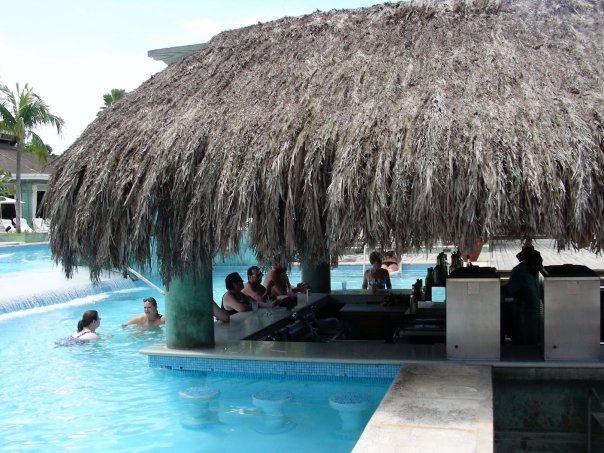
- The swim-up pool bar at Couples Negril
- Industry: Hotel
- Founded: 1949
- Founder: Abraham Issa
- Headquarters: Montego Bay, Jamaica
- Number of locations: 4 Resorts
- Area served: Caribbean
- Parent: House of Issa
- Website: couples.com

Couples Resorts is one of the pioneers of the all-inclusive resort concept in the Caribbean. Couples Resorts owns and operates four all-inclusive, couples-only beach resorts on Jamaica’s north coast, between Ocho Rios and Negril.

== History ==
Founded by Abraham Issa, the company’s first property, Tower Isle was built in Ocho Rios in 1949. The property was the first resort built on Jamaica’s undeveloped north coast. Issa came from a prominent Arab family who had arrived to Jamaica from Jerusalem in 1893. The family’s first hotel venture was the purchase of Myrtle Bank a hotel in Kingston, Jamaica’s capital city, with the United Fruit Company. They broke British colonial tradition by allowing black Jamaicans as guests. Issa served as the first chairman of the Jamaica Tourism Board when it opened in 1955. In 1978, Issa introduced the "all-inclusive, couples-only" concept to Jamaica and the Tower Isle was renamed Couples Ocho Rios. The property was again renamed years later as Couples Tower Isle.

== Properties ==
Couples Resorts properties include four boutique-style, couples-only, all-inclusive resorts, with activities that include catamaran cruises, horseback rides, Dunn's River Falls (in Ocho Rios), scuba diving, golf, spa experiences, classes (examples include drink mixing, yoga, salsa dancing, and meditation), racket sports, pool, and more.

- Couples Sans Souci - Ocho Rios
- Couples Swept Away - Negril
- Couples Tower Isle - Ocho Rios
- Couples Negril - Negril

== Issa Trust Foundation ==
The Issa Trust Foundation was established by Couples Resorts in 2005 as a 501(c)3 nonprofit with a focus on pediatric healthcare and education for children and their families in Jamaica. The foundation conducts annual pediatric medical missions to Ocho Rios and Negril, treating thousands of children who have little or no access to basic health care services. The foundation also mentors health care providers, offers job and school counseling, provides drug education and promotes drug prevention.
