= Hemisphere Dancer =

Grumman HU-16 Albatross owned by Jimmy Buffett

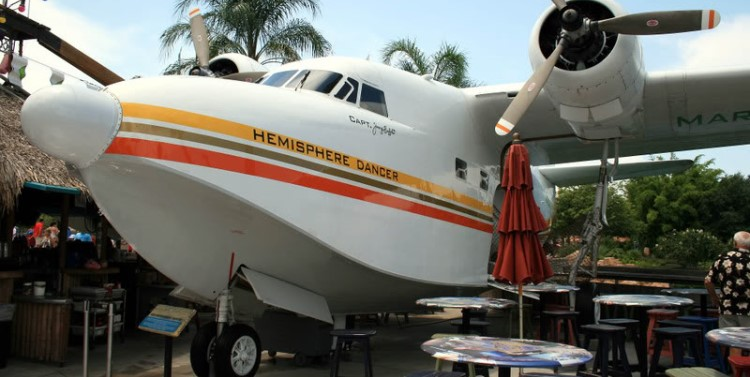
- Hemisphere Dancer parked at Jimmy Buffett's Margaritaville in Orlando, Florida

General information
- Type: Grumman HU-16C Albatross
- Owners: Jimmy Buffett
- Registration: N928J
- Serial: 137928
- Total hours: 2,689 (Navy)

History
- Manufactured: 1955
- In service: 1955–1967 (Navy)
- Preserved at: Jimmy Buffett's Margaritaville, Orlando, Florida
- Fate: Retired, on static display

Hemisphere Dancer is a Grumman HU-16 Albatross flying boat that served as singer-songwriter Jimmy Buffett's personal seaplane. The aircraft historically carried the U.S. Navy Bureau Number (BuNo) 137928 and the civil registration number N928J. The aircraft is central to the action in Buffett's best-selling memoir A Pirate Looks at Fifty.

== History ==
This aircraft began life on August 22, 1955, as a long range search and rescue platform for the U.S. Navy. The largest member of the Grumman "waterfowl" series of amphibious airplanes, the Albatross remained in service with the U.S. Navy until the mid-1970s. BuNo 137928 was retired from Navy service in August 1967 and flown to the Military Aircraft Storage and Disposition Center. After it remained inactive for a number of years and passed through intermediate owners, Buffett purchased the aircraft in November 1995, restored it, and named it Hemisphere Dancer.

=== "Jamaica Mistaica" ===
This is the plane Buffett was flying during the incident recounted in the song "Jamaica Mistaica" on the album Banana Wind. While in Jamaica on January 16, 1996, Buffett's plane was shot at by Jamaican police. The Hemisphere Dancer was carrying Buffett, U2's lead singer Bono, his wife Ali, their children Jordan and Eve, and Island Records founder Chris Blackwell. Police suspected it was smuggling drugs. No one was hurt, although there were a few bullet holes in the plane.

=== A Pirate Looks at Fifty ===
After making a number of other trips around the Caribbean with it, Buffett set off on a tour of the Caribbean, Central, and South America, in celebration of his 50th birthday. Accompanying him were his wife, son, youngest daughter, and some hired pilots to lighten the workload. Despite numerous efforts at obtaining the requisite clearances and permissions, the Hemisphere Dancer was only allowed to make a water landing once during the month-long odyssey. This action is chronicled in Buffett's autobiographical travelogue A Pirate Looks at Fifty, which was an immediate #1 best seller.

== Current status ==
Cartoon of the Hemisphere Dancer on the wall at a Margaritaville restaurant

Since publication of A Pirate Looks at Fifty, the Hemisphere Dancer has become an icon of Parrothead culture, being featured on clothing, Jimmy Buffett's Margaritaville restaurant menus, and as the namesake of drinks and garnishes at Margaritaville and Cheeseburger in Paradise Restaurants. It has made numerous visits to general aviation fly-ins such as the Sun 'n Fun and EAA AirVenture Oshkosh exhibitions.

Buffett retired the aircraft from active flying service some time between April 8, 2003 (when it was spotted at Sun 'n Fun) and June 1, 2003, when it was spotted at New Smyrna Beach Municipal Airport being dismantled for transport. By July 15, 2003 the aircraft was on-site at Universal Orlando Resort's CityWalk in Orlando, Florida, and on July 25, 2003 the Lone Palm Airport, an outdoor bar and seating area for Buffett's Margaritaville at CityWalk, opened to the public with the aircraft as its centerpiece.

The plane was removed on June 27, 2024 to undergo refurbishment, and was returned in July 2025.
