= South Negril River =

River in Jamaica

Location
- Country: Jamaica

Physical characteristics
- Source
  - coordinates: 18.2778°N 78.2560°W
  - elevation: About 250 feet (76 m)
- Mouth
  - coordinates: 18.2800°N 78.3479°W
  - elevation: Sea level
- Length: 15 km (9.3 mi)

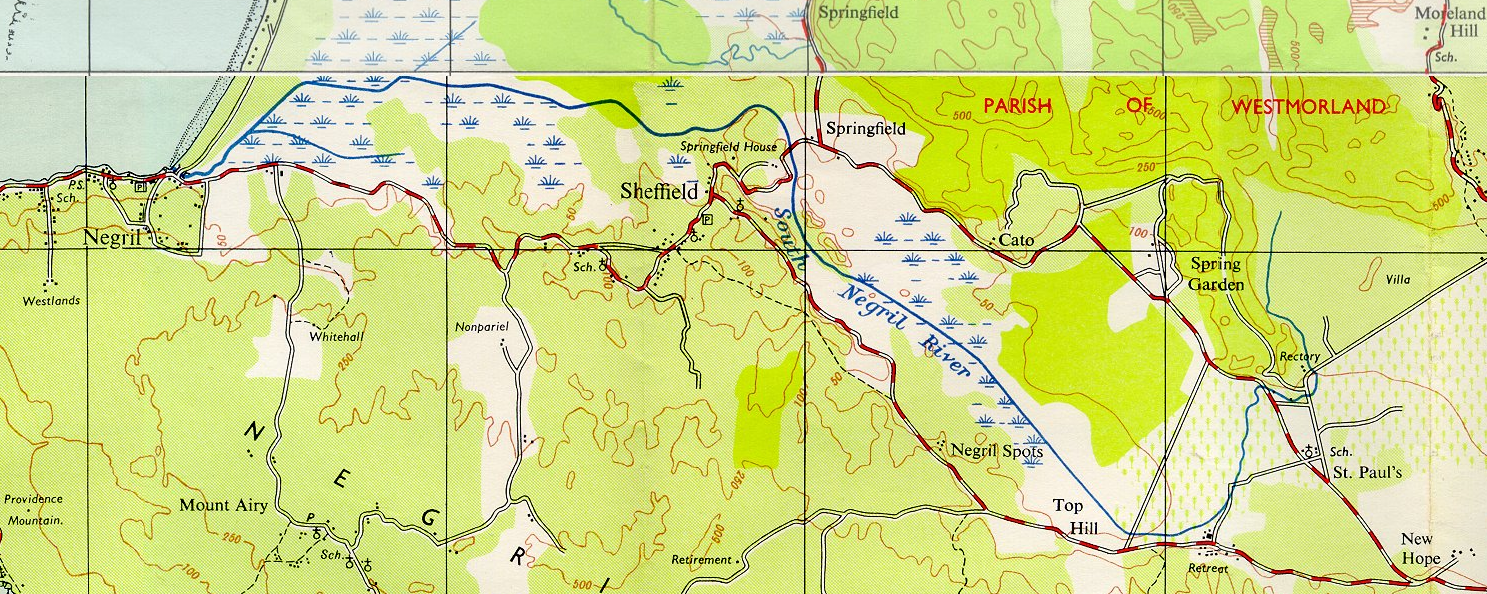
The South Negril River, Jamaica at 1:50,000.

The South Negril River is a river in Westmoreland, Jamaica.

== Course ==
The head of the river is at the base of a row of hills that rise more than 500 feet (150 m) above the inland edge of the coastal plain.

From its head the river meanders south for about 1.8 kilometres (1.1 mi), passes under a small bridge carrying the New Hope - Delve Bridge road, then swings east in a 600 metres (2,000 ft) clockwise arc round the base of a ridge of the hills (passing under two small road bridges as it does so, the first carrying the New Hope - Delve Bridge road and the second the Springfield - New Hope road) before heading south west through sugar cane fields for 2 kilometres (1.2 mi) in a straight, open culvert to a point just north west of the village of Retreat.

From Retreat the river arcs clockwise to flow north west out of the sugar cane into an area of swampy ground. After a further 3.2 kilometres (2.0 mi) it enters a region of small low hills, flowing through a defile in the middle of these for another 1 kilometre (0.62 mi) before emerging to pass under a bridge carrying the Springfield - Sheffield road.

Returning to flat agricultural terrain it continues north and west a little further, then arcs anti clockwise round another small hill to establish the westerly tendency which will carry it to the sea. At the end of this 1.6 kilometres (0.99 mi) section it passes under a small bridge carrying the Springfield - Sheffield road and reaches the south east corner of the Great Morass just north of the village of Sheffield.

Over its final 4.8 kilometres (3.0 mi) the river broadens dramatically as it flows along the southern edge of the Great Morass, gathering water as it goes, finally entering a culverted section and passing under its largest bridge (which carries the southern end of the main road paralleling Negril's seven mile beach) and out into the Caribbean Sea.

Along its route the river passes a number of small settlements and named regions including (working downstream from east to west):

- Spring Garden
- Saint Pauls
- Retreat
- Top Hill
- Negril Spots
- Cato
- Springfield
- Sheffield
- Nonpariel
- Whitehall
- Negril Town

Throughout its 15 kilometres (9.3 mi) length the river falls no more than 250 feet (76 m) giving it a very gentle average gradient of about 1 in 200.

== Infrastructure ==
Working downstream from source to mouth the South Negril River passes under:

- Two small road bridges carrying the New Hope - Delve Bridge road.
- A small road bridge carrying the Springfield - New Hope road.
- Five cane field service road plank bridges, north of Retreat.
- A small road bridge north of Springfield carrying the Springfield - Sheffield road.
- A pipe bridge north of Sheffield.
- A road bridge carrying the southern end of the main road paralleling Negril's seven mile beach. This modest structure is the largest bridge over the river.

== Tributaries ==
The South Negril River has no tributaries of any consequence.

== See also ==
- List of rivers of Jamaica
