= Where Is Joe Merchant? =

Book by Jimmy Buffett

- First edition
- Author: Jimmy Buffett
- Cover artist: Michael Koelsch
- Publisher: Harcourt Brace Jovanovich
- Publication date: 1992
- Media type: Print
- ISBN: 0-380-72118-X
- OCLC: 28567295

Where is Joe Merchant? is a novel by singer Jimmy Buffett, published in 1992. The book, a New York Times Best Seller, revolves around Frank Bama and his ex-girlfriend, hemorrhoid-ointment heiress Trevor Kane. Frank, a down-on-his-luck seaplane pilot, is about to escape to Alaska when Trevor unexpectedly jumps back into his life asking for his help in tracking down her brother, the notorious rock star Joe Merchant. Other characters joining Frank and Trevor in their search include sleazy tabloid reporter Rudy Breno, rocket scientist Desdemona, many mercenaries, and the jet ski Killer. The cover art was illustrated by Michael Koelsch.

The Arecibo Observatory is featured in the book and the lyrics to the song "Desdemona's Building A Rocket Ship". In both, a talented baker and former backup singer named Desdemona has a tryst with one of the workers "under the giant telescope", and begins receiving telepathic messages from the Pleiades, telling her to build a spaceship and "come home".

== Characters ==
=== Desdemona ===
Desdemona, a major character in the novel but not its protagonist, is a psychic based on a small island off the coast of Hispaniola. She finds her mission to be the building of a rocket ship to travel to the Pleiades. Lacking both science knowledge and working capital, she bases her rocket ship on the long abandoned rusting hulk of an airplane fuselage that had once belonged to Howard Hughes. While theoretically under construction, her ship the Cosmic Muffin also serves as her houseboat and hosts her bakery business.

Desdemona's psychic abilities involve nearly random reception of messages (usually phrased as riddles, much to her consternation) concerning both life itself and the eponymous search for Joe Merchant. She and Joe Merchant first cross paths in the 1960s in San Francisco. As their paths developed, she became a backup singer in Merchant's band, and was once married to an associate of Merchant's. Following the breakup of both her band and her marriage, and the descent of Merchant into the drug world (Desdemona herself was famed for her pot-brownies while in San Francisco), she worked her way south through the midwestern states, then to Mexico, where her interest in Astronomy and psychic ability was cultivated. Ultimately, she arrived in the small Caribbean island of Little Lorraine.

This characterization of Desdemona also appears in several of Buffett's songs, including "Fruitcakes" and "Desdemona's Building a Rocket Ship" from his album Banana Wind.
