= Banana Wind =

Studio album by Jimmy Buffett
- Released: June 4, 1996
- Studio: Shrimpboat Sound (Key West)
- Genres: Country rock; Gulf and Western
- Length: 67:44
- Labels: Margaritaville Records/MCA/ MCAD-11451 (US, CD)
- Producers: Russell Kunkel; Jimmy Buffett

Jimmy Buffett chronology
Barometer Soup (1995)	Banana Wind (1996)	Christmas Island (1996)

Professional ratings
Review scores
Source	Rating
Allmusic	2.5/5 stars
Los Angeles Times	2/4 stars

Banana Wind is the twentieth studio album by the American singer-songwriter Jimmy Buffett. It was released on MCA and Margaritaville Records on June 4, 1996, debuting at number four on the Billboard 200.

== Songs ==
"Jamaica Mistaica" is about an incident in Jamaica on January 16, 1996, in which local authorities mistook Buffett's seaplane, the Hemisphere Dancer, for a smuggling operation. The plane was shot; shortly before, Buffett, U2's Bono, and Island Records producer Chris Blackwell had been aboard. No one was injured, though there were several bullet holes in the plane. (The plane itself is now on display at Universal CityWalk, across from Buffett's Margaritaville restaurant.) "Desdemona's Building a Rocketship" concerns the character Desdemona from Buffett's 1992 novel Where Is Joe Merchant? The song "False Echoes (Havana 1921)" references the ship captained by Jimmy's grandfather, the five-masted barkentine Chickamauga, named after the civil war vessel CSS Chickamauga.

== Track listing ==
All tracks are written by Jimmy Buffett, Russ Kunkel, Roger Guth, Peter Mayer and Jim Mayer, except where noted.

Track list
No.	Title	Writer(s)	Length
1.	"Only Time Will Tell"		4:12
2.	"Jamaica Mistaica"		5:54
3.	"School Boy Heart"	Jimmy Buffett, Matt Betton	4:35
4.	"Banana Wind" (instrumental)		3:57
5.	"Holiday"	Jimmy Buffett, Ralph MacDonald, Bill Eaton, William Salter	5:05
6.	"Bob Robert's Society Band"	Jimmy Buffett, Amy Lee	3:44
7.	"Overkill"		4:55
8.	"Desdemona's Building a Rocket Ship"		7:10
9.	"Mental Floss"		4:02
10.	"Cultural Infidel"		3:58
11.	"Happily Ever After (Now and Then)"	Jimmy Buffett, Dave Loggins	4:18
12.	"False Echoes (Havana 1921)"	Jimmy Buffett	9:12
13.	"Treetop Flyer" (hidden track, starts around 20 seconds after "False Echoes" ends)	Stephen Stills	6:26

== Personnel ==
=== The Coral Reefer Band ===
- Jimmy Buffett – guitar and vocals
- Michael Utley – keyboards,
- Greg "Fingers" Taylor – harmonica
- Robert Greenidge – steel drums, percussion
- Ralph MacDonald – percussion
- Mac McAnally – acoustic guitar, mandolin, vocals
- Roger Guth – drums
- Peter Mayer – guitars, vocals
- Jim Mayer – bass, vocals
- Amy Lee – saxophone
- John Lovell – trumpet
- Thom Mitchell – saxophone
- Claudia Cummings – background vocals
- Tina Gullickson – background vocals
- Nadirah Shakoor – background vocals

=== Guest musicians ===
- James Taylor – vocals
- Ben Taylor – vocals
- Bobby O'Dononvan – violin, penny whistle
- Teddy Mulet – trombone
- Freddy Fishstick (a.k.a. Jimmy Buffett) – piano, trombone, mandolin, and vibes

== Charts ==
=== Weekly charts ===
Chart (1996)	Peak position
US Billboard 200	4

=== Year-end charts ===
Chart (1996)	Position
US Billboard 200	118
