= John Issa =

Jamaican hotelier (born 1939)

John Issa O.J., C.D, Hon. LL.D.
- Born: December 29. 1939; Kingston, Jamaica
- Education: College of the Holy Cross; St. Georges College
- Organizations: Member of the Jamaican Senate (1983-1989); Chairman,Jamaica Tourism Board (1984-1989); President, Jamaica Hotel and Tourist Association (1972-1974)
- Title: Executive chairman, SuperClubs
- Spouse: Aida Issa (m. 1964)
- Children: 3
- Awards: Order of Jamaica; Brazil Order of the Southern Cross; Bahamas Order of Excellence

John Issa (born December 29, 1939) is a Jamaican hotelier and businessman. He is the executive chairman of SuperClubs Resorts, a hospitality company he founded in 1976. Known as the “Father of All-Inclusive,” he created the expanded all-inclusive resort model that became standard throughout Jamaica.

Issa was the president of the Jamaica Hotel and Tourism Association in the 1970s, the chairman of the Jamaican Tourist Board in the 1980s, and a member of the Jamaican Senate from 1983-1989. He is the recipient of awards including the Order of Jamaica, Brazil Order of the Southern Cross and Bahamas Order of Excellence. He was pictured on a Jamaican postage stamp in 2004.

== Early life and education ==
Issa was born in 1939 in Kingston, Jamaica to Joseph E. and Minerva Issa. He is a descendent of Elias Issa, who moved from Bethlehem to Jamaica in 1893. The Issa family business began with a Kingston notion shop Elias founded in 1894 and grew to become a retail, automotive, insurance, banking, and hospitality conglomerate operating throughout the country.

Issa attended Campion Preparatory School, St. George's College and the College of the Holy Cross in Worcester, Massachusetts. He graduated magna cum laude with a BS in business administration with a special interest in marketing. Following his graduation, Issa returned to Jamaica to work in the family's hotel business with his uncle, Abe Issa.

== Career ==
Issa learned the hotel industry "top down" as the managing director of three of the family's hotels: The Myrtle Bank Hotel, The Montego Inn, and the Tower Isle Hotel. In 1976, he founded SuperClubs Resorts and opened Negril Beach Village, the first hotel on Negril Beach.

Issa began developing an all-inclusive model after realizing that during the economic downturn of the 1970s, cruises and Club Med resorts, which had all-inclusive pricing in common, remained successful. In response, he created a "Super Inclusive" model that expanded traditional all-inclusive pricing from accommodations and three daily meals to a flat fee that covered access to activities and amenities such as horseback riding, windsurfing, top-shelf alcohol, entertainment, and unlimited food and drinks. The flat fee also covered taxes and tips.

Negril Beach Village was renamed Hedonism II in 1981. An adults-only resort, it was marketed as an opportunity to be "Wicked for a Week, " with ad campaigns that emphasized sexual freedom. Its flat fee included activities such as skinny-dipping, toga parties, and nude volleyball. Hedonism II was consistently profitable, and in 1999, Issa opened a "more risque" property, Hedonism III. A nude wedding at the resort during which 29 couples were married on Valentines Day 2001 generated worldwide media coverage.

Issa opened the first resort for couples in Jamaica with Couples Ocho Rios in 1978. Bescobel Beach, an all inclusive resort for families, opened in 1983. In 1989, SuperClubs opened its first luxury resort, Grand Lido Negril Resort & Spa, a five star all-suite property that Condé Nast Traveler named "Best Resort in the Caribbean and Latin America". The Grand Lido brand expanded to include three resorts, and all three, in addition to SuperClub's boutique hotels, Rooms on the Beach, and SuperClubs StarfishTrelawney, a family resort, were later rebranded as Breezes. Three Breezes resorts had already been established when the other properties were renamed. Since it was founded, there have been 25 SuperClubs resorts in eight countries, including The Bahamas, Brazil, Cuba,Curaçao, Dominican Republic, Saint Lucia, and Panama.

== Civil service, board appointments, recognition ==
In addition to serving as chairman of the Jamaican Tourist Board, president of the Jamaica Hotel and Tourism Association, and on the advisory committee to the minister of Industry, Tourism, and Foreign Trade. and served the Jamaican government as a senator from 1984 to 1989. He is the honorary chairman of The Gleaner Company.

He holds the Order of Jamaica (O.J.), Commander of the Order of Distinction (C.D.), Justice of the Peace (J.P.). He received the Brazilian Order of the Southern Cross (Officer Rank) in 2001. In 2004, he was featured on a Jamaican 40-cent postage stamp marking the centenary of the Jamaica Hotels Law of 1904. In 2024, he was awarded the Bahamian Order of Excellence by the Government of the Bahamas. He also received honorary Doctor of Laws from the University of the West Indies and Northern Caribbean University.

== Personal life ==
John and Aida Issa were married in 1964. Their three children have served in executive roles at SuperClubs. Aida, a partner in SuperClubs, redesigned the interiors of SuperClubs properties. She also wrote Super Recipes, a cookbook that highlighted traditional Jamaican food.
