= Key West =

Island and city in Florida, United States

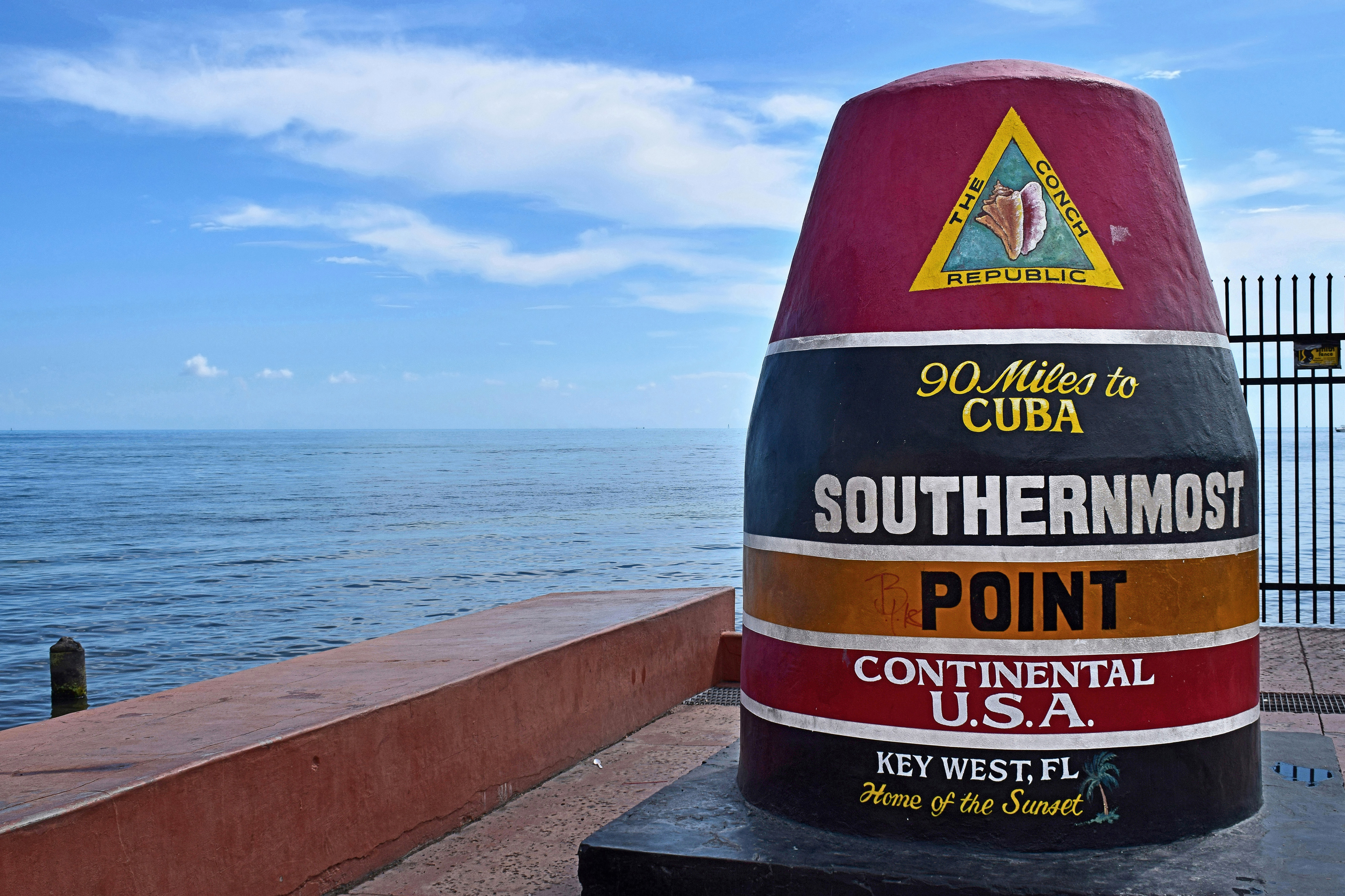
- Southernmost Point Buoy

Geography
- Location: Atlantic Ocean
- Coordinates: 24°33′55″N 81°46′33″W
- Archipelago: Florida Keys
- Area: 4.2 sq mi (11 km^{2})
- Length: 4 mi (6 km)
- Width: 1 mi (2 km)
- Highest elevation: 18 ft (5.5 m)
- Highest point: Solares Hill, 18 ft (5.5 m) above sea level
- City
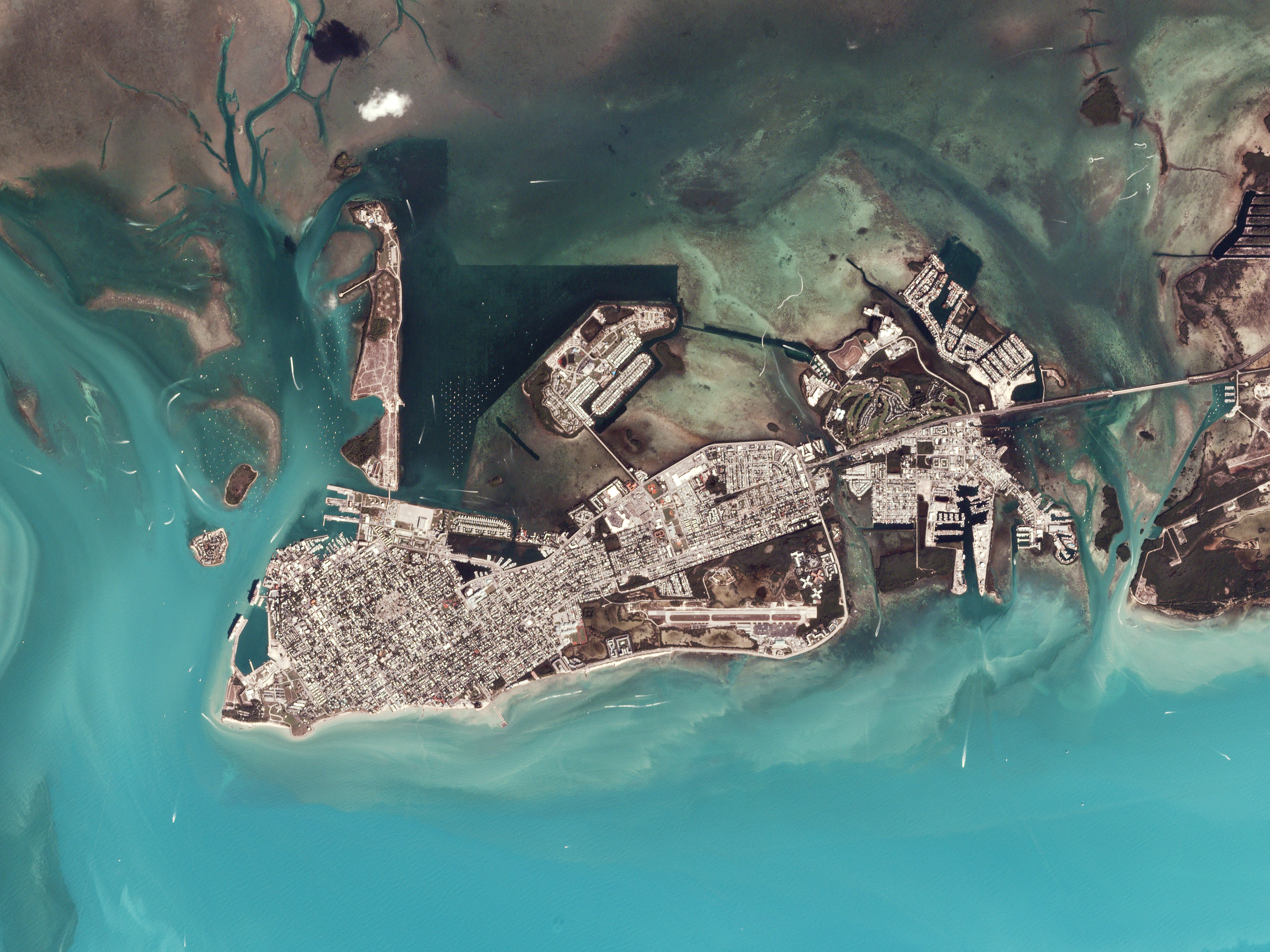
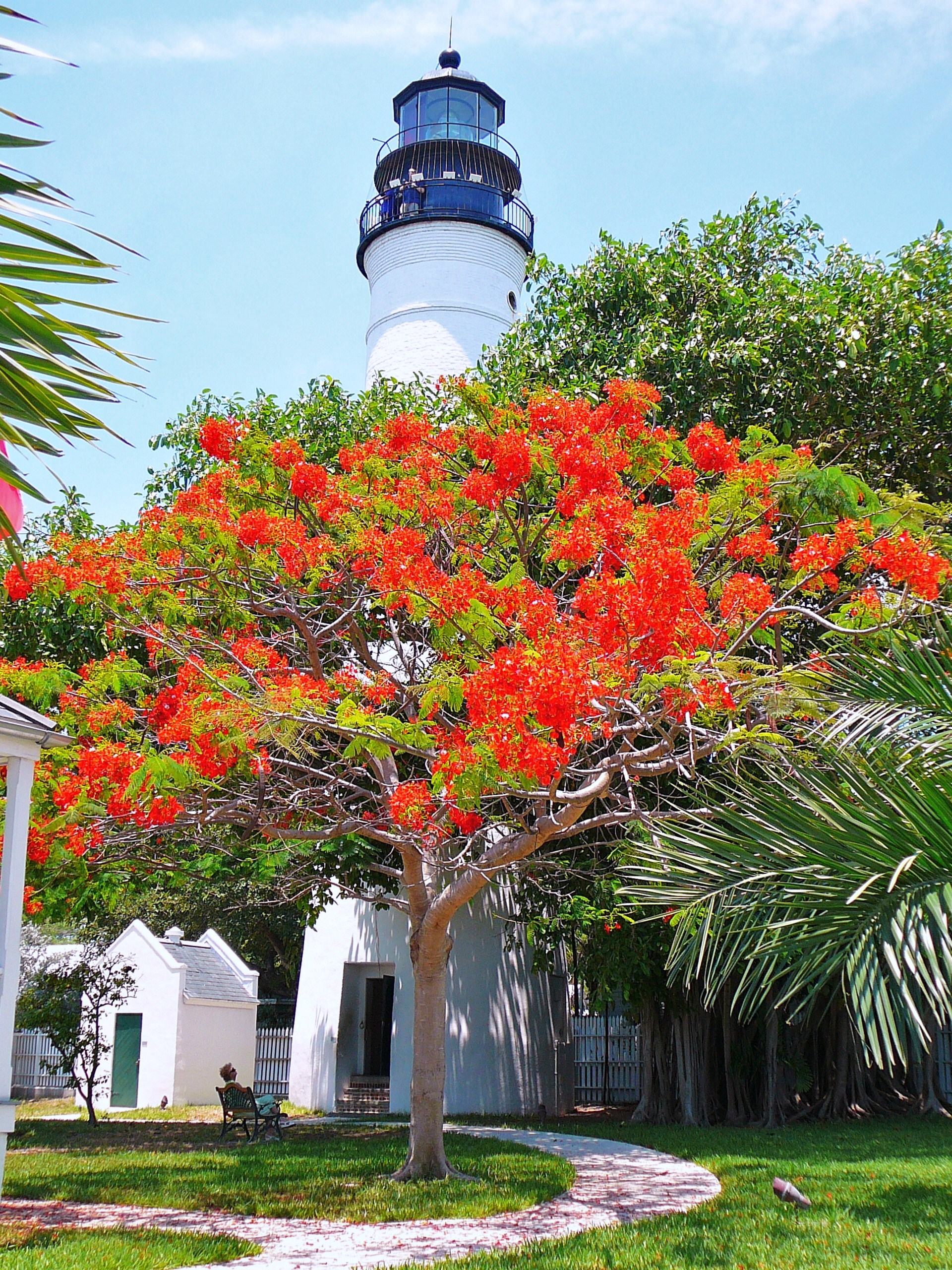
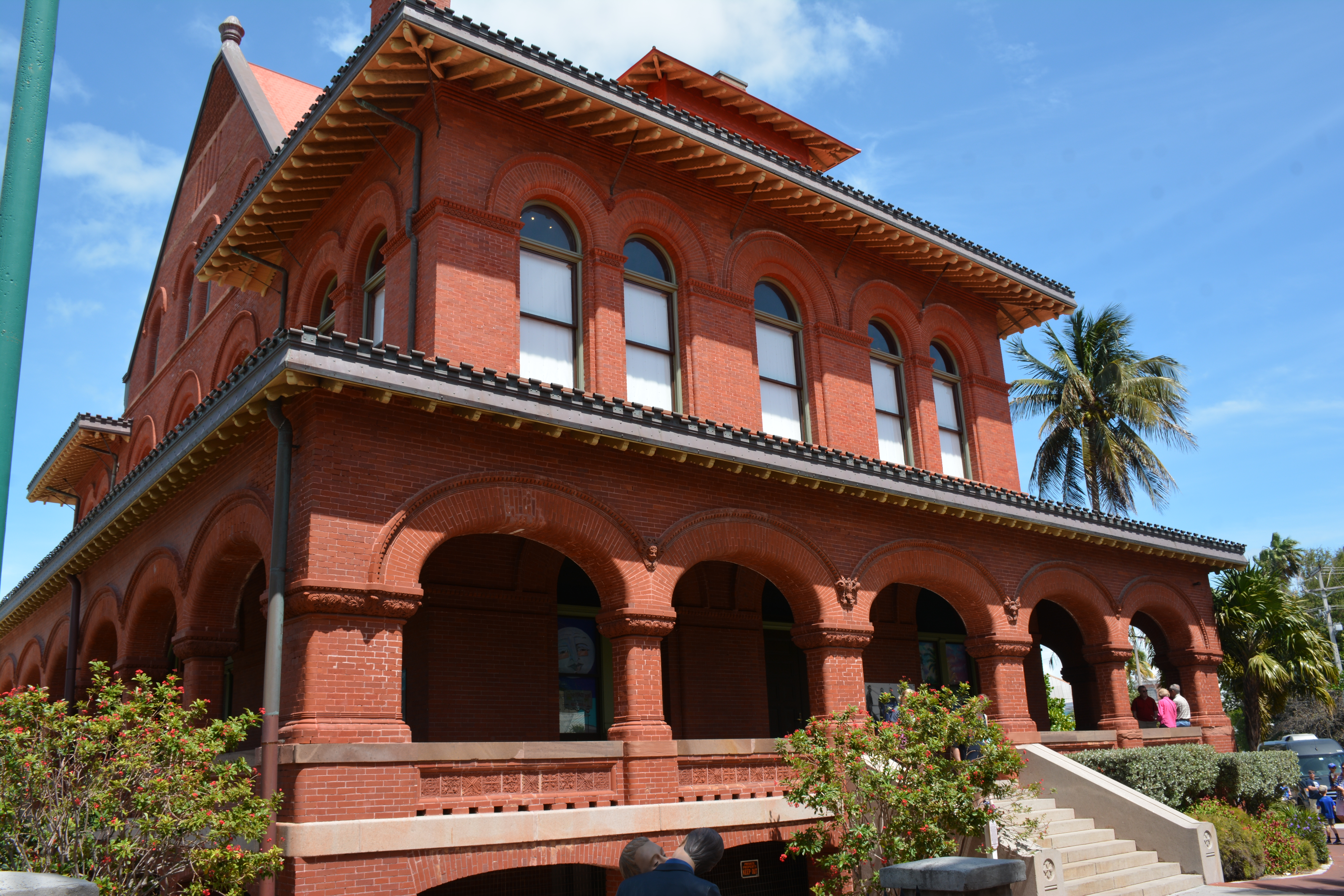
- Satellite view of Key West Key West Lighthouse Old Post Office and Customshouse

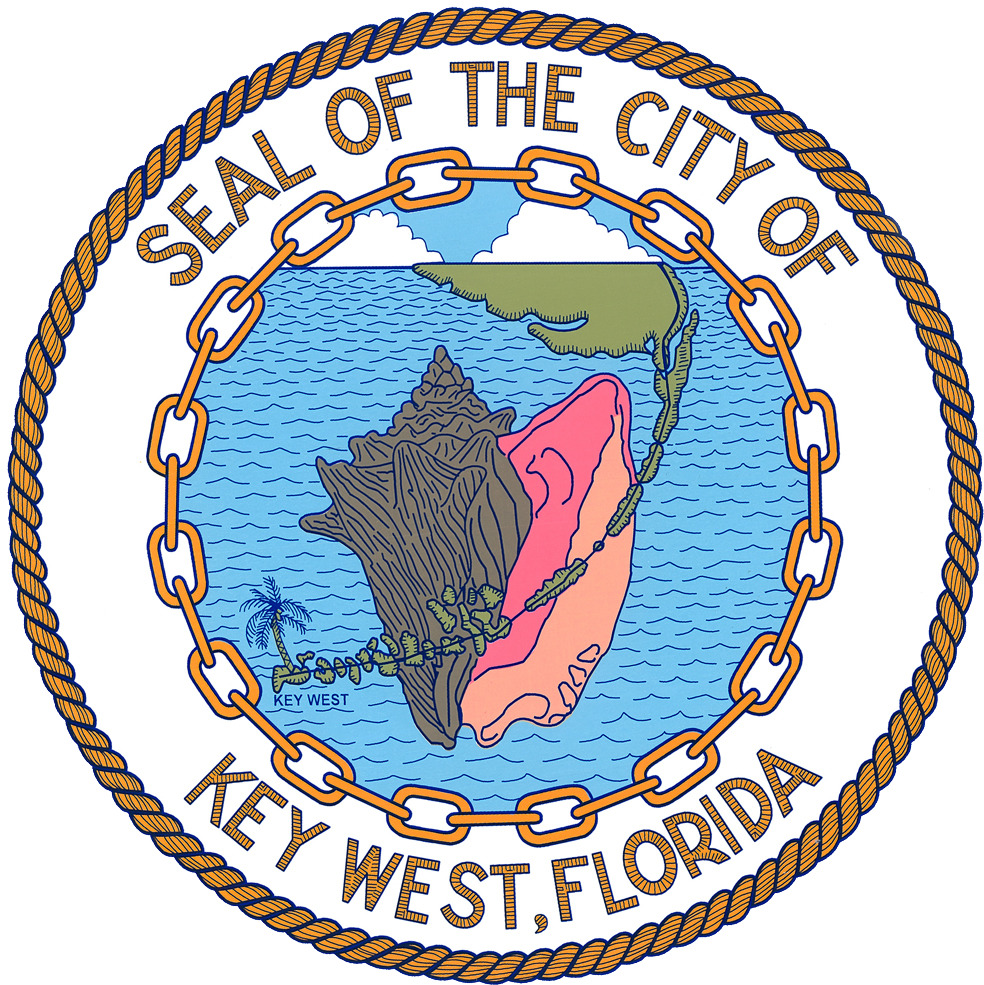
- Flag Seal
- Nicknames: "The Conch Republic" "Southernmost City in the Continental United States"
- Motto: One Human Family
- Interactive map of Key West, Florida
- Location of Key West in Florida Key West (the United States)
- Coordinates: 24°33′18″N 81°46′55″W
- Country: United States
- State: Florida
- County: Monroe

Government
  - Type: Commission–Manager
  - Mayor: Danise "Dee Dee" Henriquez
  - Commissioners: Monica Haskell, Lissette Carey, Samuel Kaufman, Mary Lou Hoover, Donald "Donnie" Lee, and Aaron Castillo
  - City Manager: Brian Barroso
  - City clerk: Keri O'Brien
  - City attorney: Ronald J. Ramsingh

Area
  - Total: 7.21 sq mi (18.67 km^{2})
  - Land: 5.60 sq mi (14.50 km^{2})
  - Water: 1.61 sq mi (4.17 km^{2})
- Elevation: 5 ft (1.5 m)

Population (2020 United States census)
  - Total: 26,444
  - Density: 4,722.7/sq mi (1,823.44/km^{2})
- Time zone: UTC−5 (Eastern (EST))
  - Summer (DST): UTC−4 (EDT)
- ZIP Codes: 33040–33041, 33045
- Area codes: 305, 786, and 645
- FIPS code: 12-36550
- GNIS feature ID: 0294048
- Website: cityofkeywest-fl.gov

Key West (Spanish: Cayo Hueso [kaʝo ˈweso]) is a coral cay island in the Straits of Florida, at the southernmost end of the U.S. state of Florida and its outlying Florida Keys archipelago. Together with all or parts of the separate islands of Dredgers Key, Fleming Key, Sunset Key, and the northern part of Stock Island, it constitutes the City of Key West.

For thousands of years, Key West and the surrounding islands were inhabited by various Native American tribes. The island's first recorded European contact occurred in 1513, when an expedition led by Spanish conquistador Juan Ponce de León circumnavigated the Florida Keys amid his voyage along the coast of Florida, though no permanent settlement was established. Over the following centuries, the island remained sparsely populated while passing between periods of Spanish and British control. Following the transfer of Florida to the United States in 1819, Key West rapidly developed into a major maritime center, with its strategic location along the Florida Straits and thriving wrecking industry helping make it one of the wealthiest communities in the United States during the 19th century.

Key West is the southernmost city in the contiguous United States and the westernmost island in the Florida Keys connected by highway, located about 130 miles (210 km) southwest of Miami and roughly 95 miles (153 km) north of Cuba. The island measures approximately 4 miles (6 km) long and 1 mile (2 km) wide, with a total land area of about 4.2 square miles (11 km²), and the city itself spans roughly 5.6 square miles (14.5 km²). It serves as the county seat of Monroe County, which includes a majority of the Florida Keys and part of the Everglades, and had a population of 26,444 at the 2020 census, carrying the motto “One Human Family.”

Key West functions as a major transportation and tourism hub, serving as the southern terminus of U.S. Route 1 and hosting a passenger cruise port, an international airport, and Naval Air Station Key West. Its main commercial corridor is Duval Street, which runs from the Gulf of Mexico to the Atlantic Ocean. Key West lies within the Florida Keys National Marine Sanctuary and is located near several protected areas, including the Dry Tortugas National Park and the Key West National Wildlife Refuge; due to its proximity to the Great Florida Reef, the island serves as a notable center for recreational diving.

== History ==
=== Precolonial and colonial times ===
At various times before the 19th century, people who were related or subject to the Calusa and the Tequesta inhabited Key West. The last Native American residents of Key West were Calusa refugees who were taken to Cuba when Florida was transferred from Spain to Great Britain in 1763.

Cayo Hueso (Spanish pronunciation: [ˈkaʝo ˈweso]) is the original Spanish name for the island of Key West. It literally means "bone cay", cay referring to a low island or reef. It is said that the island was littered with the remains (bones) of prior native inhabitants, who used the isle as a communal graveyard. This island was the westernmost Key with a reliable supply of water. Between 1763, when the Kingdom of Great Britain took control of Florida from Spain, and 1821, there were few or no permanent inhabitants anywhere in the Florida Keys. Cubans and Bahamians regularly visited the Keys, the Cubans primarily to fish, while the Bahamians fished, caught turtles, cut hardwood timber, and salvaged wrecks. Smugglers and privateers also used the Keys for concealment.

In 1766 the British governor of East Florida recommended that a post be set up on Key West to improve control of the area, but nothing came of it. During both the British and Spanish periods no nation exercised de facto control. The Bahamians apparently set up camps in the Keys that were occupied for months at a time, and there were rumors of permanent settlements in the Keys by 1806 or 1807, but the locations are not known. Fishermen from New England started visiting the Keys after the end of the War of 1812, and may have briefly settled on Key Vaca in 1818.

=== Ownership claims ===
An Accurate Chart of the Tortugas and Florida Kays or Martyrs c., 1790

In 1815, the Spanish governor of Cuba in Havana deeded the island of Key West to Juan Pablo Salas, an officer of the Royal Spanish Navy Artillery posted in Saint Augustine, Florida. After Florida was transferred to the United States in 1821, Salas was so eager to sell the island that he sold it twice – first for a sloop valued at $575 to a General John Geddes, a former governor of South Carolina, and then to a U.S. businessman John W. Simonton, during a meeting in a Havana café on January 19, 1822, for the equivalent of $2,000 in pesos in 1821.

Geddes tried in vain to secure his rights to the property before Simonton who, with the aid of some influential friends in Washington, was able to gain clear title to the island. Simonton had wide-ranging business interests in Mobile, Alabama. He bought the island because a friend, John Whitehead, had drawn his attention to the opportunities presented by the island's strategic location. John Whitehead had been stranded in Key West after a shipwreck in 1819 and he had been impressed by the potential offered by the deep harbor of the island. The island was indeed considered the "Gibraltar of the West" because of its strategic location on the 90-mile (140 km)–wide deep shipping lane, the Straits of Florida, between the Atlantic Ocean and the Gulf of Mexico.

On March 25, 1822, Lt. Commander Matthew C. Perry sailed the schooner USS Shark to Key West and planted the U.S. flag, claiming the Keys as United States property. No protests were made over the American claim on Key West, so the Florida Keys became the de facto property of the United States. After claiming the Florida Keys for the United States, Perry renamed Cayo Hueso (Key West) to Thompson's Island for Secretary of the Navy Smith Thompson, and the harbor Port Rodgers in honor of War of 1812 hero and President of the Navy Supervisors Board John Rodgers. In 1823, Commodore David Porter of the United States Navy West Indies Anti-Pirate Squadron took charge of Key West, which he ruled as military dictator under martial law. The United States Navy gave Porter the mission of countering piracy and the slave trade in the Key West area.

=== Early development ===
Following the purchase of Key West by John W. Simonton in 1821, the island was subdivided and sold to a small group of investors who became known as its early “founding fathers,” including John Whitehead, John Fleeming, and Pardon C. Greene. Greene was the only one to permanently settle on the island, where he became a prominent merchant, city council member, and briefly served as mayor before his death in 1838. Whitehead, who had originally encouraged Simonton’s purchase, lived on the island intermittently and later left permanently in 1832, while Fleming remained only briefly before departing for Massachusetts. The island’s early development was further shaped by Simonton’s lobbying efforts in Washington, D.C., wherein he promoted Key West’s strategic maritime value and advocated for the establishment of a naval base.

In 1829, the island was formally platted by William Adee Whitehead. During this period, Key West expanded rapidly as maritime trade, wrecking, and shipping industries grew, supported by its designation as a U.S. port of entry and the establishment of local courts and governance structures. By the 1830s, Key West had become the wealthiest city per capita in the United States, driven by its strategic location along major shipping lanes and the expansion of salvage-based commerce. Throughout the 1840s, Key West was repeatedly impacted by severe hurricanes, including the devastating 1846 Havana hurricane, which caused widespread destruction across the island. However, religious and educational development continued to advance, marked by the construction of St. Mary’s Star of the Sea Catholic Church in 1852 and the establishment of the first Catholic school in South Florida in 1864, founded by the Sisters of the Holy Names of Jesus and Mary. The school is still operating today and is now known as the Basilica School of Saint Mary Star of the Sea. By the mid-19th century, Key West had emerged as both a wealthy maritime hub and a strategically significant settlement in the southeastern United States.

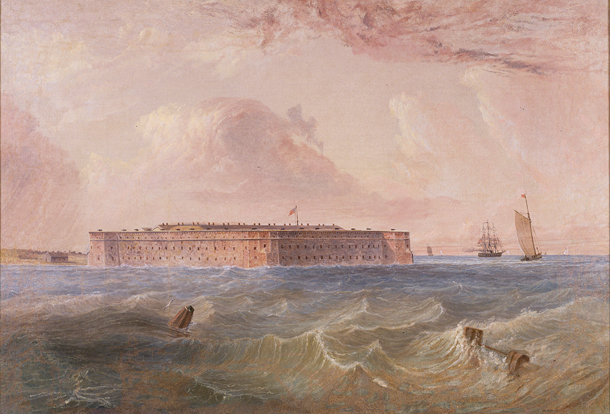
Fort Taylor, Florida by Seth Eastman

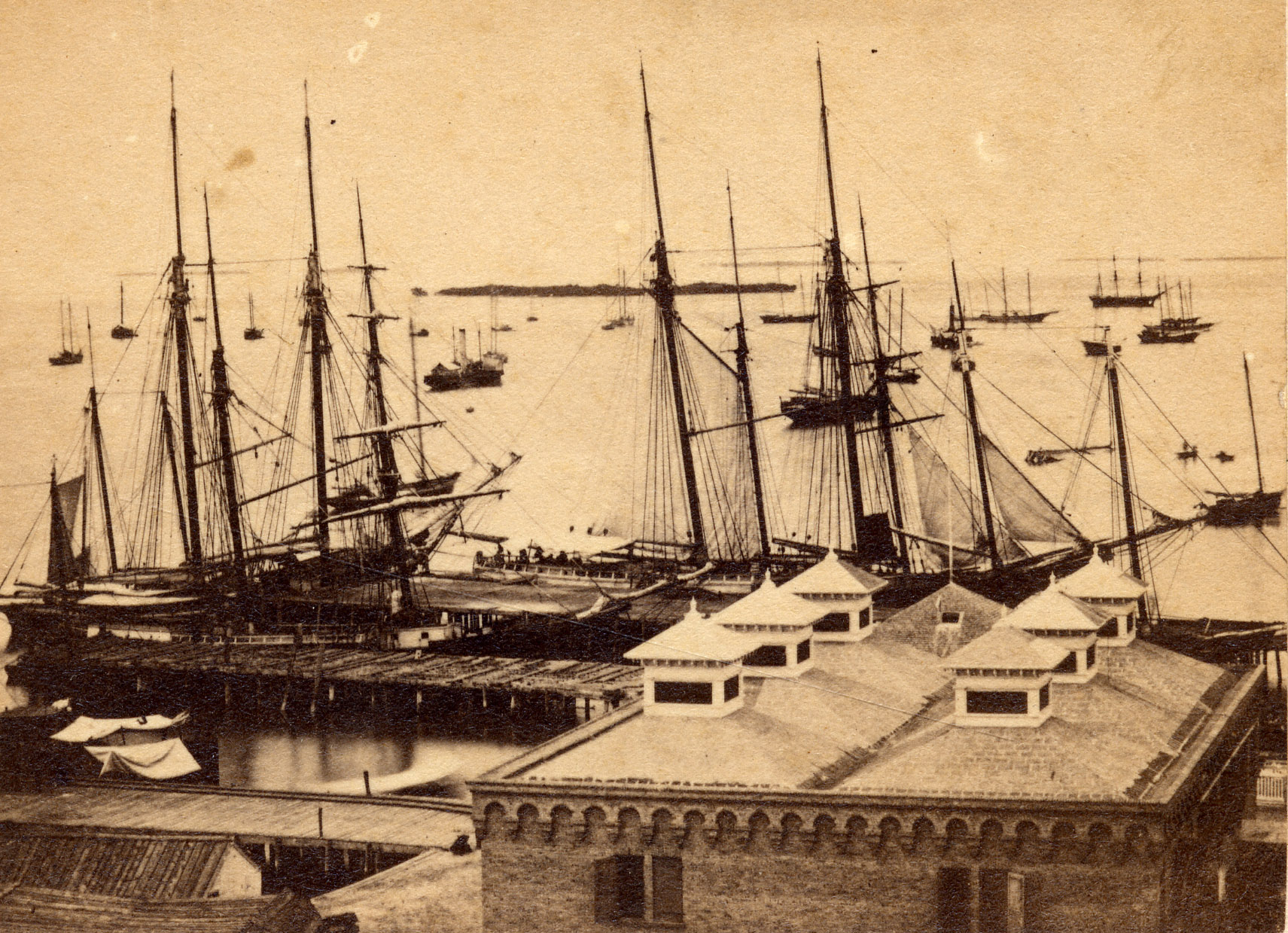
The top of the building at the end of Duval Street and Key West Harbor c., 1870

=== American Civil War and late 19th century ===
During the American Civil War, while Florida seceded and joined the Confederate States of America, Key West remained in U.S. Union hands because of the naval base. Most locals were sympathetic to the Confederacy, however, and many flew Confederate flags over their homes. However, Key West was also home to a large free black population. This population grew during the war as more enslaved black people fled from their enslavers and came under the relative safety of the Union garrison there. Fort Zachary Taylor, constructed from 1845 to 1866, was an important Key West outpost during the Civil War. Construction began in 1861 on two other forts, East and West Martello Towers, which served as side armories and batteries for the larger fort. When completed, they were connected to Fort Taylor by railroad tracks for movement of munitions.

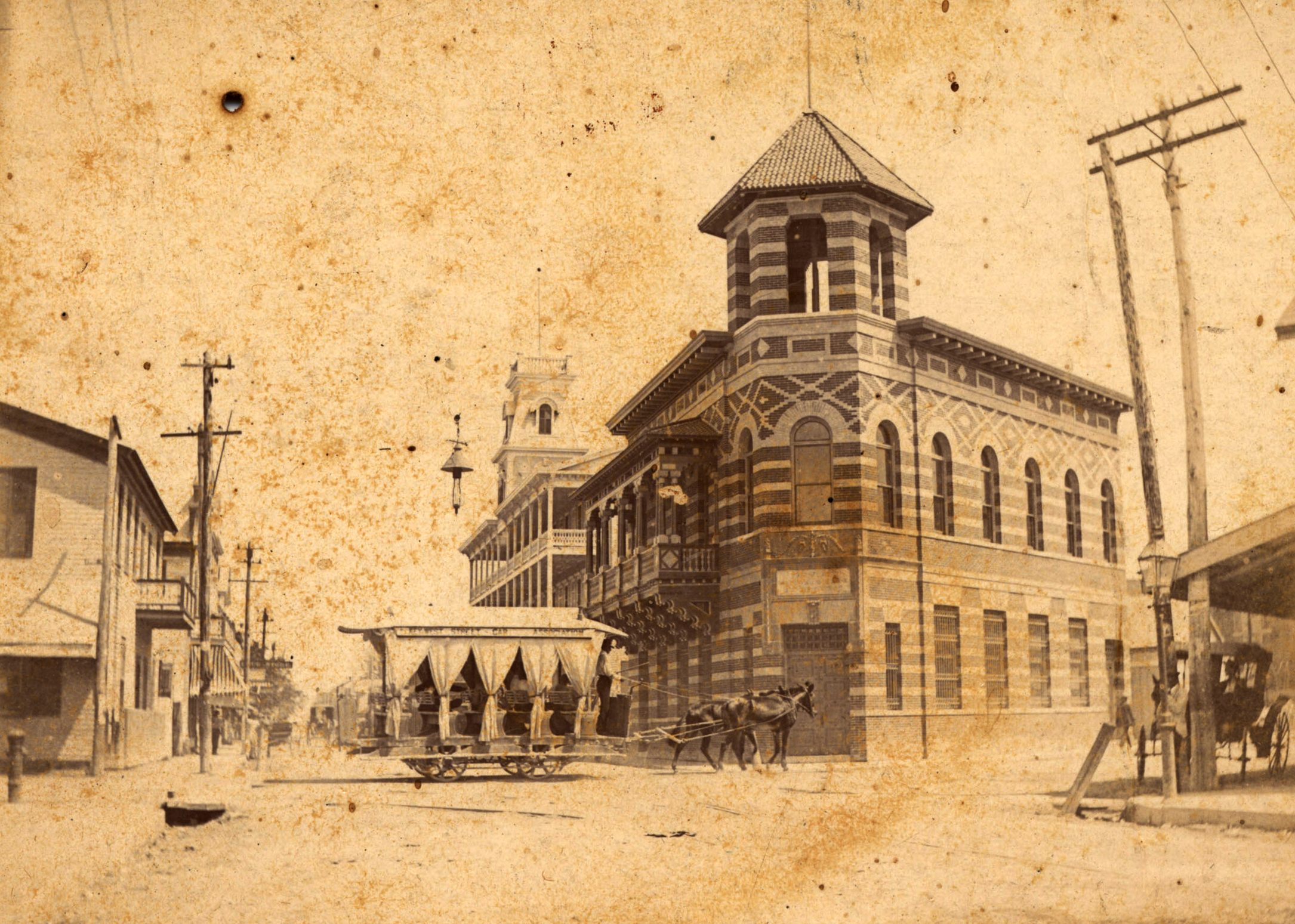
Horse drawn tram on Front Street at Duval Street c., 1895

Early in 1864, 900 men from the 2nd United States Colored Troops (USCT) arrived in Key West as replacements for the 47th Pennsylvania Volunteers. Many of these men would see action in southern Florida and the 2nd USCT would become "one of the most active" black regiments in Florida. Fort Jefferson, located about 68 miles (109 km) from Key West on Garden Key in the Dry Tortugas, served after the Civil War as the prison for Samuel A. Mudd, convicted of conspiracy for setting the broken leg of John Wilkes Booth, the assassin of President Abraham Lincoln.

In the 19th century, major industries included wrecking, fishing, turtling, and salt manufacturing. From 1830 to 1861, Key West was a major center of U.S. salt production, harvesting the commodity from the sea (via receding tidal pools) rather than from salt mines. After the outbreak of the Civil War, Union troops shut down the salt industry after Confederate sympathizers smuggled the product into the South. Salt production resumed at the end of the war, but the industry was destroyed by an 1876 hurricane and never recovered, in part because of new salt mines on the mainland.

During the Ten Years' War (an unsuccessful Cuban war for independence in the 1860s and 1870s), many Cubans sought refuge in Key West. Several cigar factories relocated to the city from Cuba, and Key West quickly became a major producer of cigars. The Great Fire of Key West, on April 1, 1886, started at a coffee shop next to the San Carlos Institute and spread out of control, destroyed 18 cigar factories and 614 houses and government warehouses. Some factory owners chose not to rebuild and instead moved their operations to the new community of Ybor City in Tampa, leading to a slow decline in the cigar industry in Key West. Still, Key West remained the largest and wealthiest city in Florida at the end of the 1880s.

USS Maine sailed from Key West on her fateful visit to Havana, where she blew up and sank in Havana Harbor, igniting the Spanish–American War. Crewmen from the ship are buried in Key West, and the Navy investigation into the blast occurred at the Key West Customs House.

=== 20th century ===
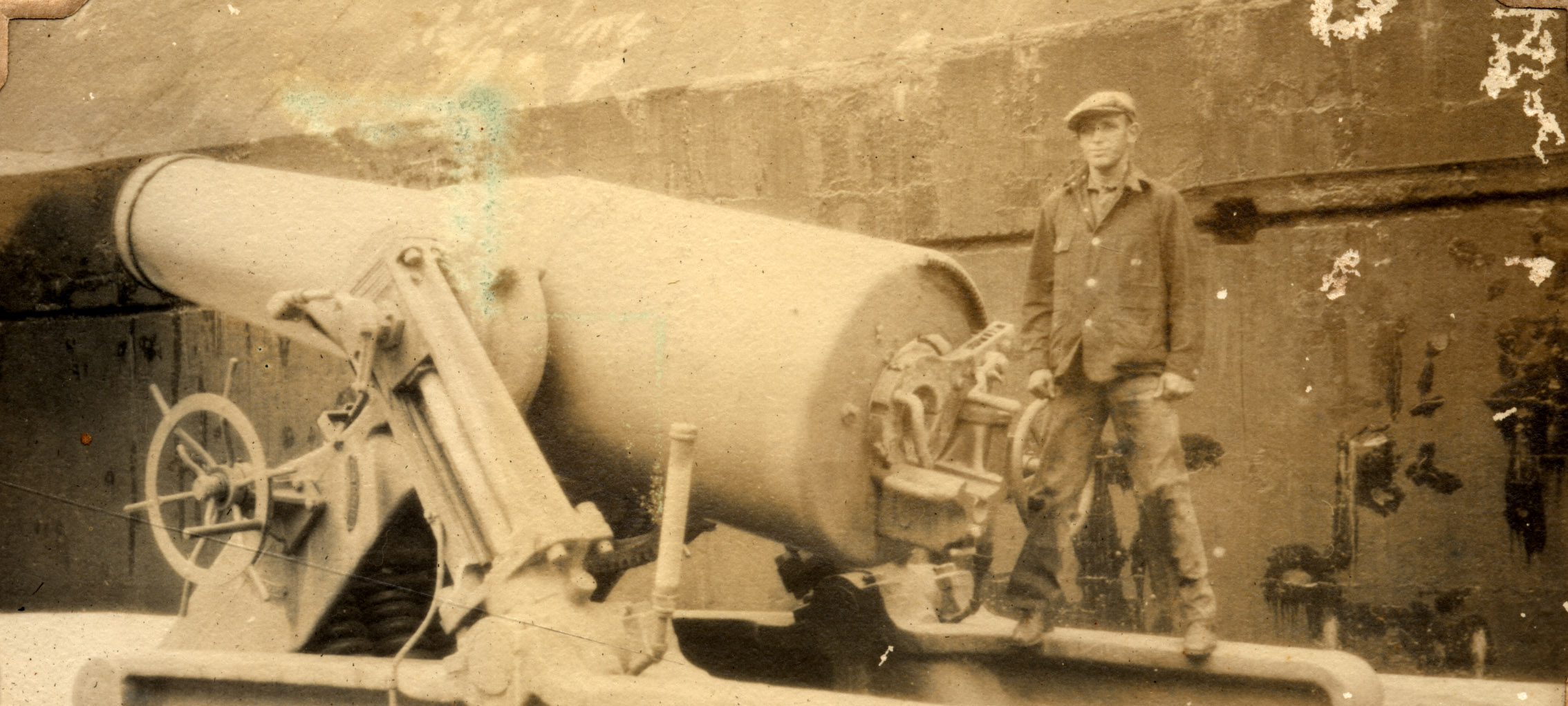
A 12 inch mortar at Fort Taylor c., 1932

In October 1909, Key West was severely impacted by the 1909 Florida Keys hurricane. Additional damage occurred the following year as a result of the 1910 Cuba hurricane. At the time, the city remained relatively isolated until 1912, when it was connected to the Florida mainland through the Overseas Railroad, an extension of Henry M. Flagler's Florida East Coast Railway. As part of the project, Flagler constructed a landfill at Trumbo Point for railway operations. In 1919, the Florida Keys experienced another destructive storm, causing significant damage in the area. On December 25, 1921, local resident Manuel Cabeza was lynched by members of the Ku Klux Klan for living with a Black woman. In 1926, Pan American Airlines was founded in Key West, initially to transport passengers to Havana, Cuba. The following year, the airline began a contract with the United States Postal Service to carry mail between Cuba and the United States, operating the Key West, Florida – Havana Mail Route.

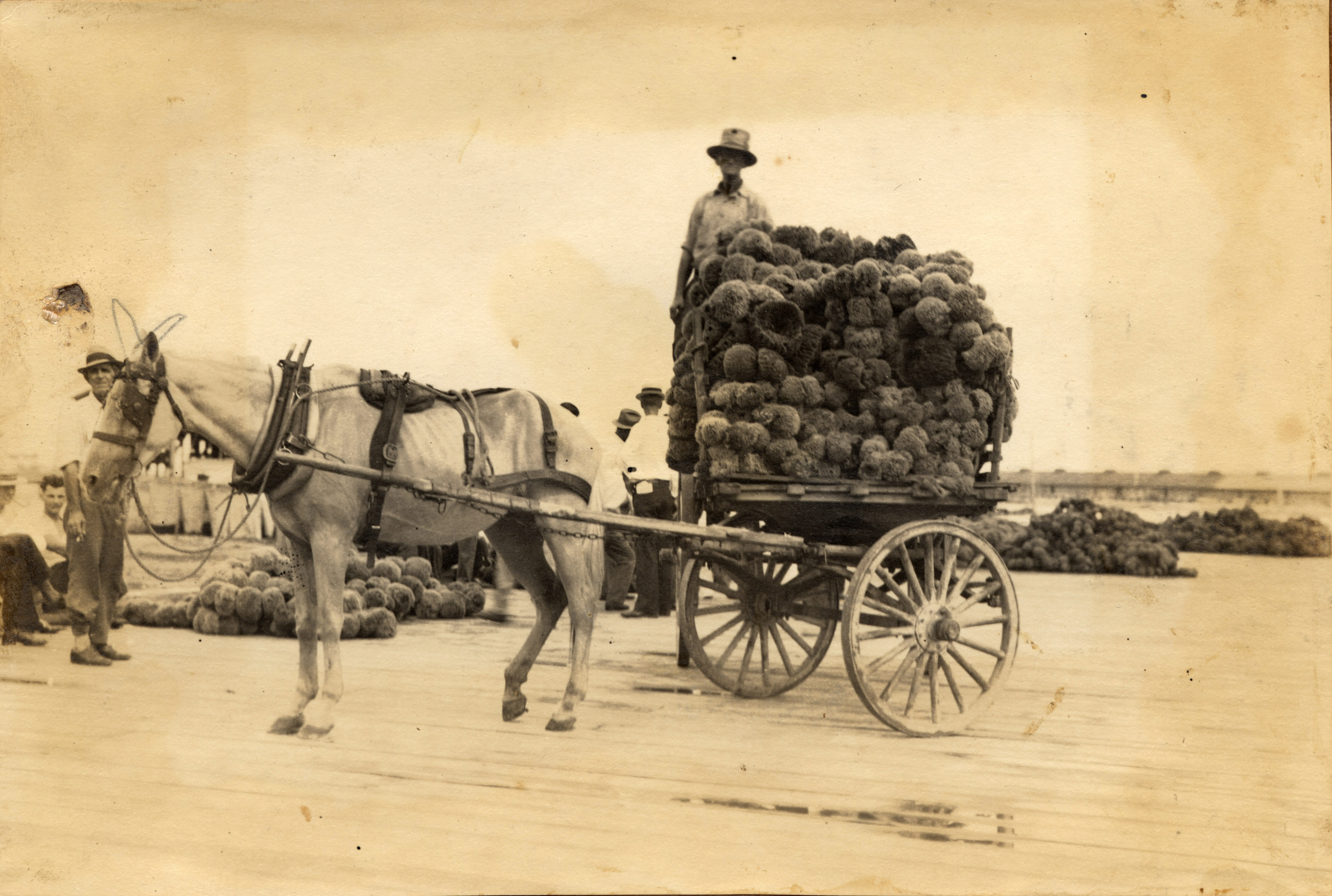
A horse cart loaded with sponges in Key West

In 1935, the Labor Day Hurricane destroyed much of the Overseas Railway and caused substantial loss of life, including approximately 400 World War I veterans who had been working on federal infrastructure projects in the Middle Keys. The Florida East Coast Railway was unable to fund repairs, and the U.S. government later rebuilt the route as an automobile highway. Completed in 1938, this road was constructed atop sections of the former railway and became part of U.S. Route 1, known as the Overseas Highway. President Franklin D. Roosevelt visited the road in 1939. During World War II, over 14,000 ships passed through the island's harbor. The local population increased significantly at times due to the presence of military personnel, laborers, and tourists. Beginning in 1946, President Harry S. Truman established a working vacation residence in Key West, known as the Harry S. Truman Little White House, where he spent a total of 175 days during his presidency.

In 1948, Key West was affected by two hurricanes in quick succession—the September 1948 Florida hurricane and the 1948 Miami hurricane. Prior to the Cuban Revolution of 1959, transportation between Key West and Havana included regular ferry and air services. During the early 1960s, President John F. Kennedy frequently referenced Key West's proximity to Cuba in public speeches, and he visited the island shortly after the Cuban Missile Crisis.

In 1982, the city briefly declared symbolic independence as the "Conch Republic" in response to a United States Border Patrol blockade at the junction of U.S. Route 1 and the mainland in Florida City. The resulting traffic delays significantly disrupted tourism. The protest, while symbolic, remains a part of local culture, and the Conch Republic Independence Celebration is held annually on April 23.

== Geography ==
Key West is an island located at 24°33′55″N 81°46′33″W in the Straits of Florida. The island is about 4 miles (6 km) long and 1 mile (2 km) wide, with a total land area of 4.2 square miles (10.9 km^{2}; 2,688.0 acres). The average elevation above sea level is about 8 feet (2.4 m) and the maximum elevation is about 18 feet (5.5 m), within a 1-acre (0.40-hectare) area known as Solares Hill.

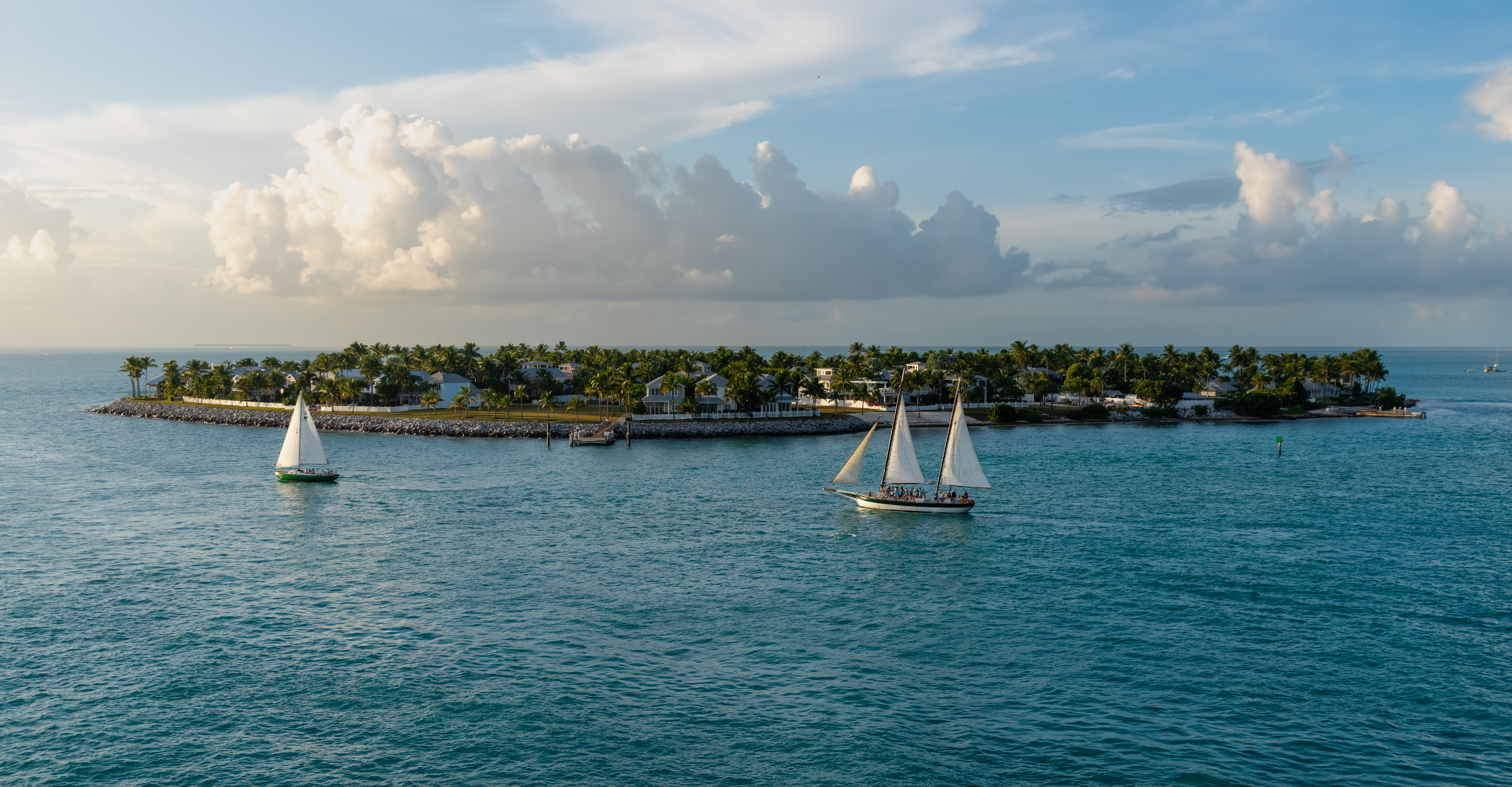
Sunset Key, roughly 500 yards (460 m) off the coast of Key West island.

The city of Key West is the southernmost city in the contiguous United States, and the island is the westernmost island connected by highway in the Florida Keys. The city boundaries include the island of Key West and several nearby islands, as well as the section of Stock Island north of U.S. Route 1, on the adjacent key to the east. The total land area of the city is 5.6 square miles (15 km^{2}), with an additional 1.6 square miles (4.1 km^{2}) of surrounding water within the city limits. Sigsbee Park—originally known as Dredgers Key—and Fleming Key, both located to the north, and Sunset Key located to the west are all included in the city boundaries. Both Fleming Key and Sigsbee Park are part of Naval Air Station Key West and are inaccessible to the general public. In the late 1950s, many of the large salt ponds on the eastern side of the island were filled in. The new section on the eastern side is called New Town, which contains shopping centers, retail malls, residential areas, schools, ball parks, and Key West International Airport.

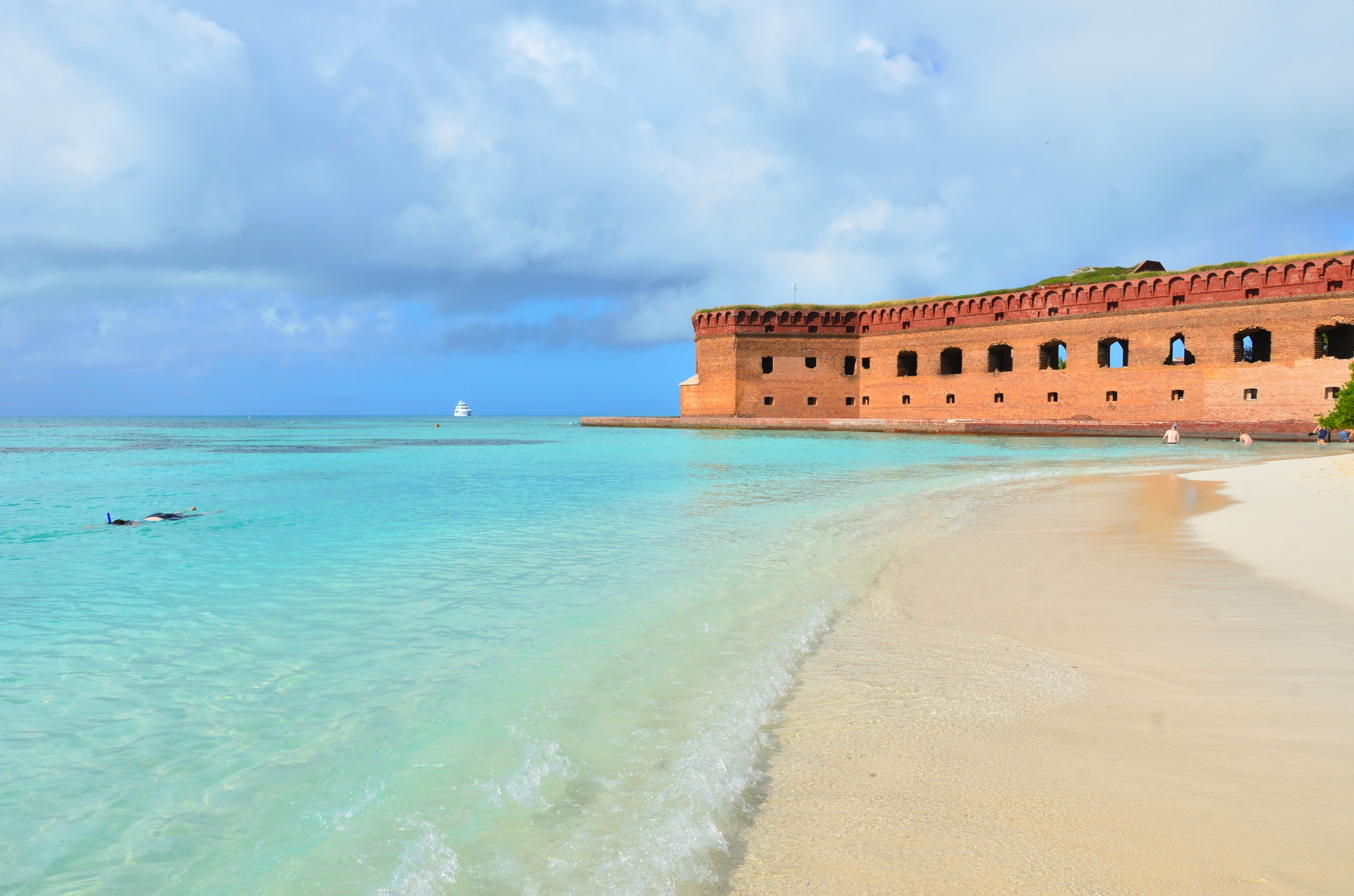
Fort Jefferson, a coastal masonry fort located on the Garden Key of the Florida Keys within nowadays Dry Tortugas National Park.

Key West and most of the rest of the Florida Keys are on the dividing line between the Atlantic Ocean and the Gulf of Mexico. The two bodies have different currents, with the calmer and warmer Gulf of Mexico being characterized by great clumps of seagrass. The shallow passage known as Hawk Channel lies directly south of the island and is conducive to the exchange of Gulf waters to the Atlantic via tidal currents. The area where the two bodies merge between Key West and Cuba is called the Straits of Florida. The warmest ocean waters anywhere on the United States mainland are found in the Florida Keys in winter, with sea surface temperatures averaging in the 75–77 °F (24–25 °C) range in December through February.

Duval Street is the main street in Key West and is 1.1 miles (1.8 km) in length in its 14-block-long crossing from the Gulf of Mexico to the Straits of Florida and the Atlantic Ocean. Key West is closer to Havana (about 106 miles or 171 kilometers by air or sea) than it is to Miami (130 miles or 210 kilometers by air or 165 miles or 266 kilometers by road). Key West is the usual endpoint for marathon swims from Cuba, including Diana Nyad's 2013 swim and Susie Maroney's 1997 swim from within a shark cage.

=== Notable places ===
==== Old Town ====
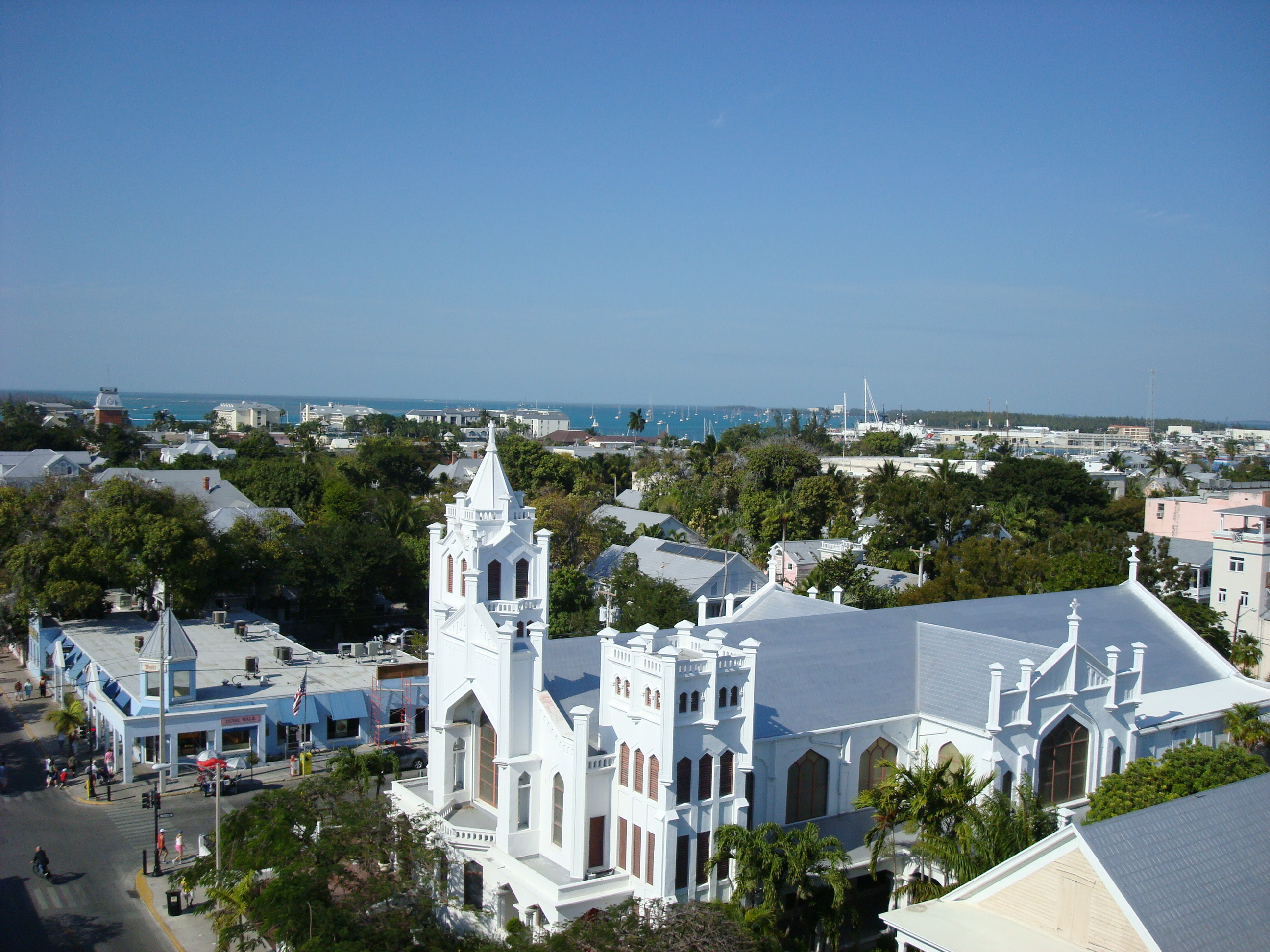
St. Paul's Episcopal Church

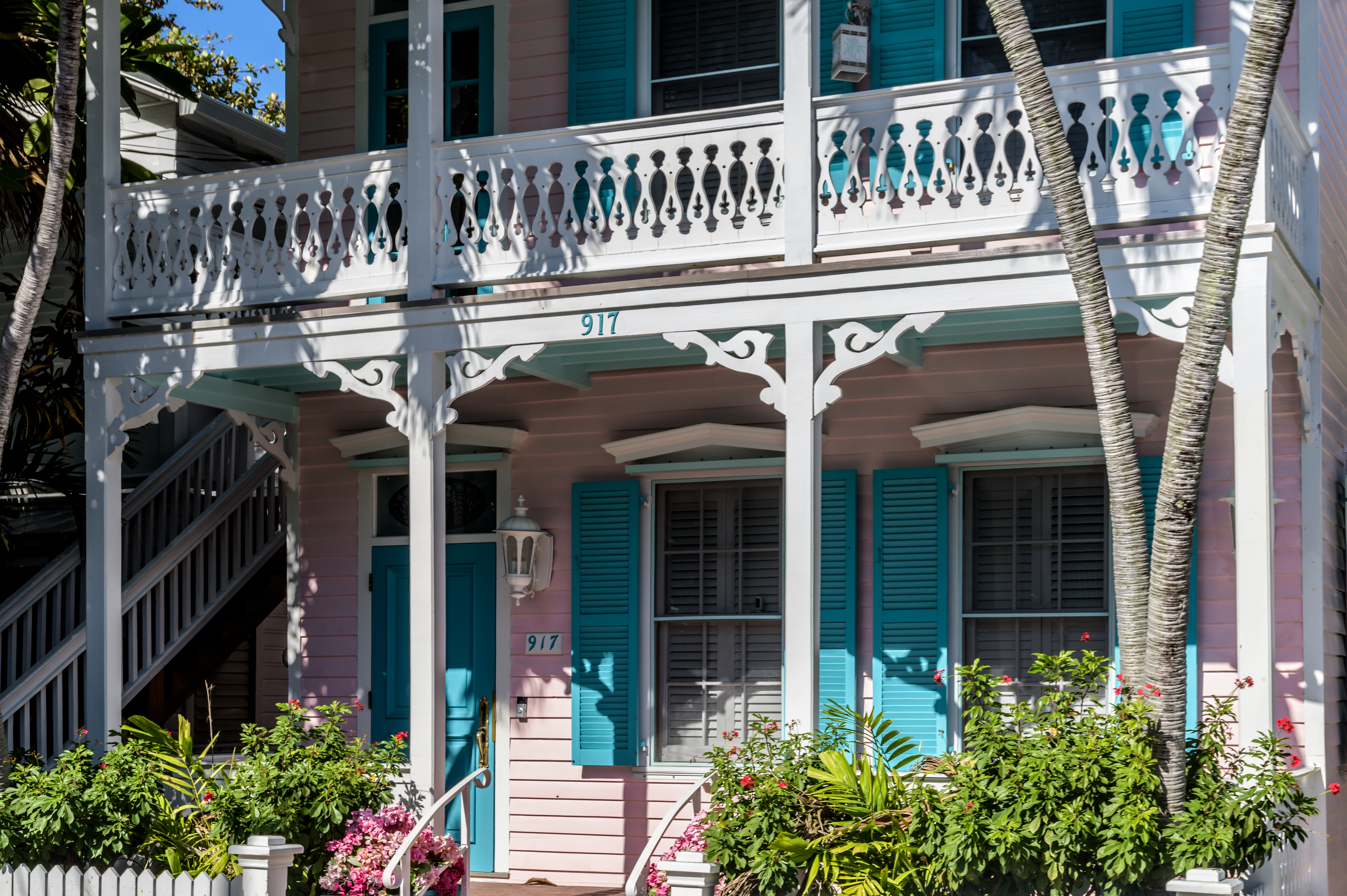
Exterior characteristics of Key West's local architectural style

The earliest Key West neighborhoods, on the western part of the island, are broadly known as Old Town. The Key West Historic District includes the major tourist destinations of the island, including Mallory Square, Duval Street, the Truman Annex, and Fort Zachary Taylor. Old Town is where the classic bungalows and guest mansions are found. Bahama Village, southwest of Whitehead Street, features houses, churches, and sites related to its Afro-Bahamian history. The Meadows, lying northeast of the White Street Gallery District, is exclusively residential.

Many of the structures in Old Town date from 1886 to 1912. The basic features that distinguish the local architecture include wood-frame construction of one- to two-and-a-half-story structures set on foundation piers about three feet (one meter) above the ground. Exterior characteristics of the buildings are peaked metal roofs, horizontal wood siding, gingerbread trim, pastel shades of paint, side-hinged louvered shutters, covered porches (or balconies, galleries, or verandas) along the fronts of the structures, and wood lattice screens covering the area elevated by the piers.

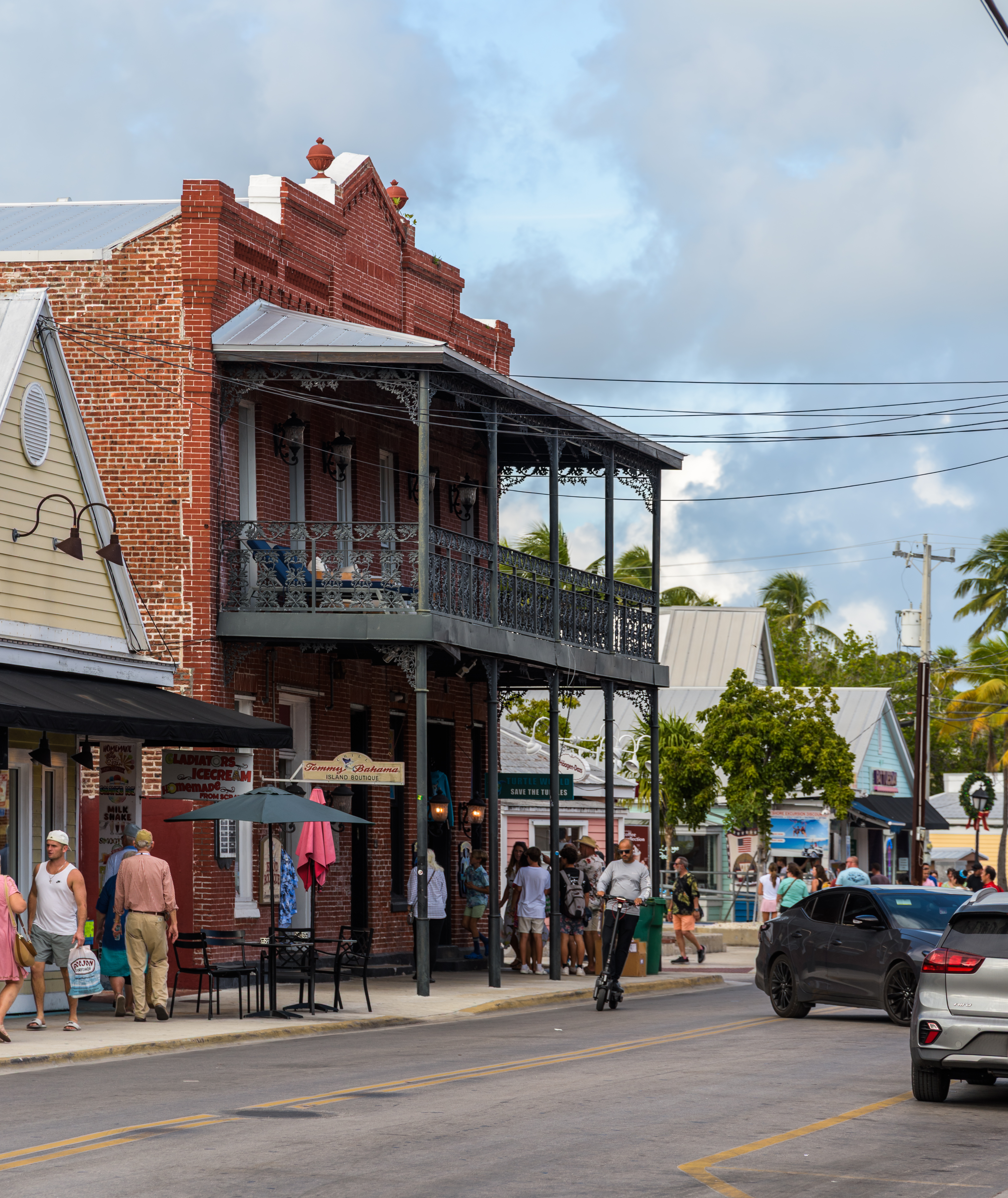
The Harbor House, Front Street

Some antebellum structures survive, including the Oldest (or Cussans-Watlington) House (1829–1836) and the John Huling Geiger House (1846–1849), now preserved as the Audubon House and Tropical Gardens. Fortifications such as Fort Zachary Taylor, the East Martello Tower, and the West Martello Tower, helped ensure that Key West would remain in Union control throughout the Civil War. Another landmark built by the federal government is the Key West Lighthouse, now a museum.

Two of the most notable buildings in Old Town, occupied by prominent 20th-century residents, are the Ernest Hemingway House, where the writer lived from 1931 to 1939, and the Harry S. Truman Little White House, where the president spent 175 days of his time in office. Additionally, the residences of some historical Key West families are recognized on the National Register of Historic Places as important landmarks of history and culture, including the Porter House on Caroline Street and the Gato House on Virginia Street.

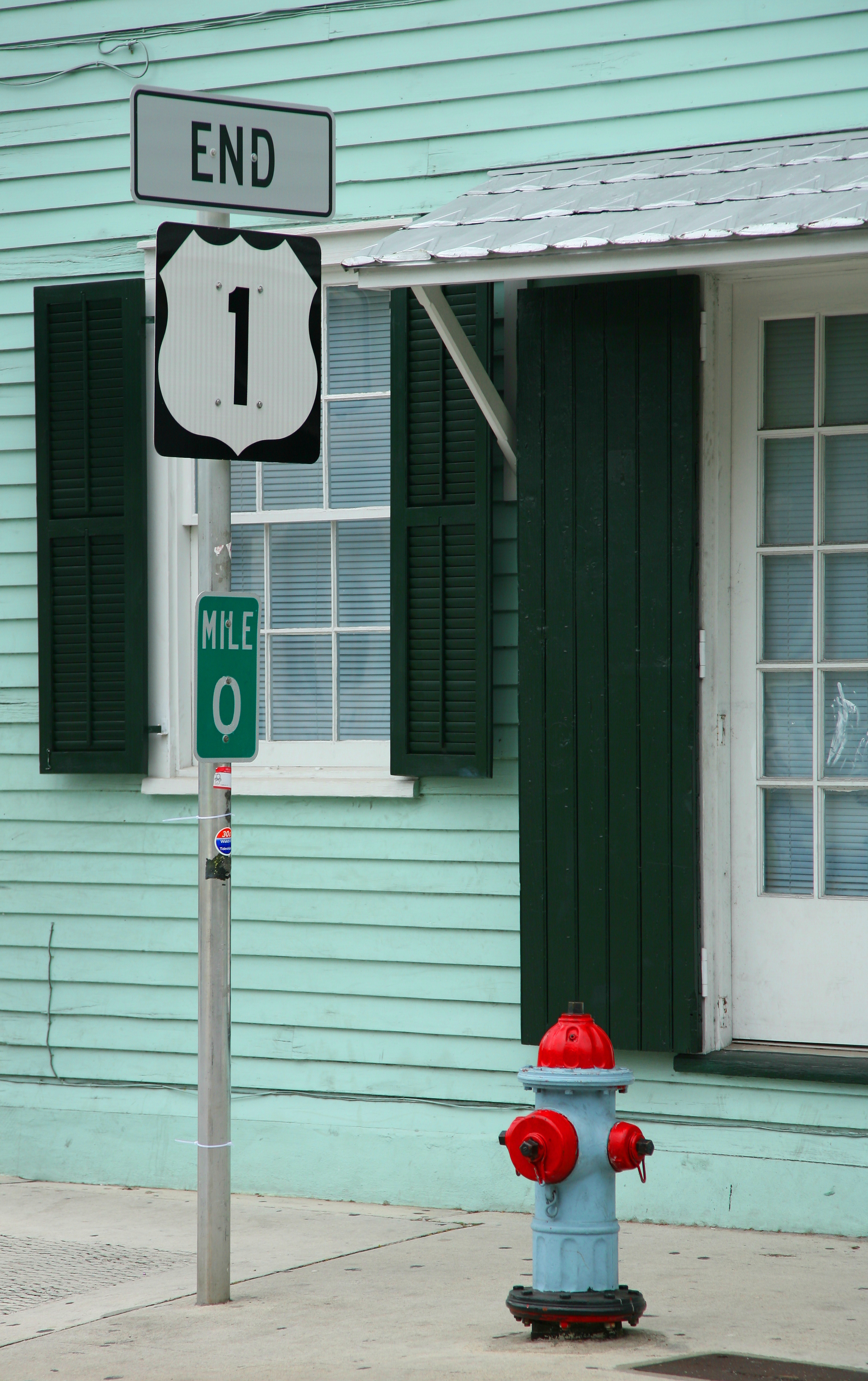
End of US Highway 1

Several historical residences of the Curry family remain extant, including the Benjamin Curry House, built by the brother of Florida's first millionaire, William Curry, as well as the Southernmost House and the Fogarty Mansion, built by the children of William Curry—his daughter Florida and son Charles, respectively. In addition to architecture, Old Town includes the Key West Cemetery, founded in 1847, containing above-ground tombs, notable epitaphs, and a plot where some of the dead from the 1898 explosion of USS Maine are buried.

==== Casa Marina ====
The Casa Marina area takes its name from the Casa Marina Hotel, opened in 1921, the neighborhood's most conspicuous landmark. The Reynolds Street Pier, Higgs Beach, the West Martello Tower, the White Street Pier, and Rest Beach line the waterfront.

==== Southernmost point in the United States ====
One of the most popular attractions on the island is a concrete replica of a buoy at the corner of South and Whitehead Streets that claims to be the southernmost point in the contiguous United States. The point was originally marked with a basic sign. The city of Key West erected the current monument in 1983. The monument was repainted after damage by Hurricane Irma in 2017, and is the most often photographed tourist site in the Florida Keys.

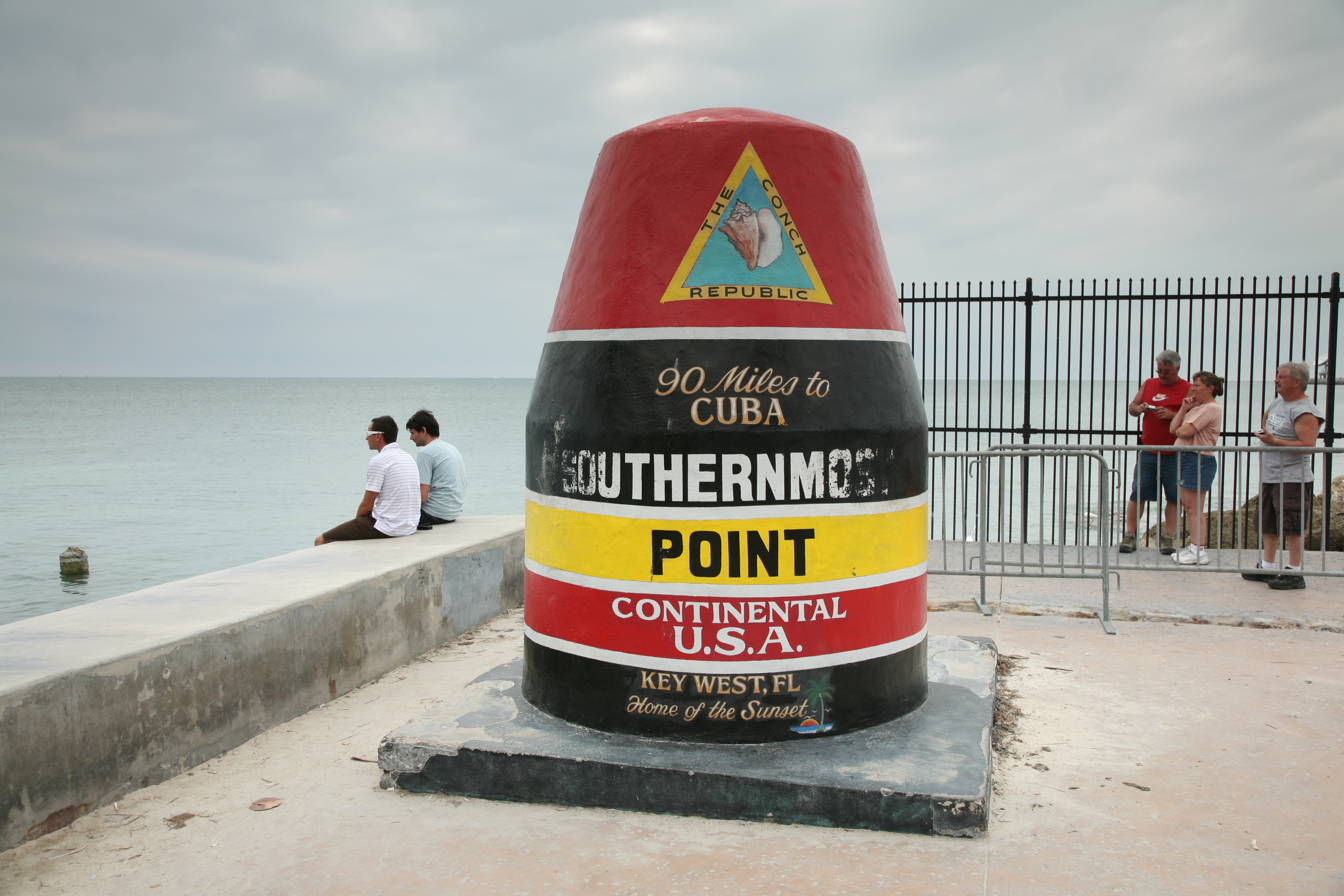
Southernmost Point Buoy

Although the monument is labeled "Southernmost point continental U.S.A.", the actual southernmost point of Key West is Whitehead Spit, which is on the Truman Annex property just west of the buoy. The spit has no marker since it is on U.S. Navy land that cannot be entered by civilian tourists. The private property directly to the east of the buoy, and the beach areas of Truman Annex and Fort Zachary Taylor Historic State Park, also lie farther south than the buoy. The southernmost point of the contiguous United States is Ballast Key, a privately owned island just south and west of Key West. The southernmost location that the public can visit is the beach at Fort Zachary Taylor park.

The monument states "90 Miles to Cuba", although Key West and Cuba are actually about 95 statute miles (153 kilometers; 83 nautical miles) apart at their closest points. Note that the distance from the monument to Havana is, however, about 90 nautical miles (104 statute miles; 167 kilometers).

==== Key West Library ====
The first public library was officially established in 1853, which was housed in the then-Masonic Temple on Simonston Street, near where the federal courthouse is today. At the time, the first library president was James Lock, with the librarian being William Delaney. At the time, the library collected held 1,200 volumes for residents to access.

In 1919, a hurricane destroyed the library. Key West residents moved the library to various locations across the island. The county took over and finally found a permanent location. The library's new location was found in 1959. It was built on Fleming Street, where it is still found today.

===== "Spoonbill" =====
In 1961, the Monroe County Library System sponsored a bookmobile, "Spoonbill", to service the entire Keys. By 1962, "Spoonbill" was making stops in ten different Keys, over one hundred miles (160 km), from Key Largo in the North to Key West in the South. Mrs. Barbara Banning was the driver-librarian, driving over 25,000 miles (40,000 km) in the first year and a half, circulating more than 28,000 titles.

On Mondays, the "Spoonbill" would be loaded with books in Key West and Banning and her assistant, or volunteer, would drive up to Key Largo, Tavernier, and Islamorada, stopping for an hour in each location; Wednesdays the "Spoonbill" made stops in Marathon, Big Pine, Little Torch, and Summerland.

On Thursdays, the "Spoonbill" would only travel twenty miles (32 km) from home base, making stops in Bay Point, Big Coppitt, and Gulf Rest. At Bay Point there was a popular children's story hour, servicing roughly three hundred school-age children and led by former kindergarten teacher, Mrs. Ernest Hense.

===== Collection =====
The Key West Library has a collection of 70,000 items, including a letter from singer-songwriter Jimmy Buffett. Dated from October 22, 1984, the letter expresses gratitude for the library in giving inspiration for the songs he would eventually write, and for the air conditioning. As of 2022, the Key West Library is a part of the Monroe County Public Library System.

=== Notable residences ===
==== Little White House ====
Several U.S. presidents have visited Key West with the first being Ulysses S. Grant in 1880, followed by Grover Cleveland in 1889, and William Howard Taft in 1912. Taft was the first president to use the first officer's quarters that would later be known as the Little White House. Franklin D. Roosevelt visited the Florida Keys many times, beginning in 1917. Harry S. Truman visited Key West for a total of 175 days on 11 visits during his presidency and visited five times after he left office. His first visit was in 1946. The Little White House and Truman Annex take their names from his frequent and well-documented visits.

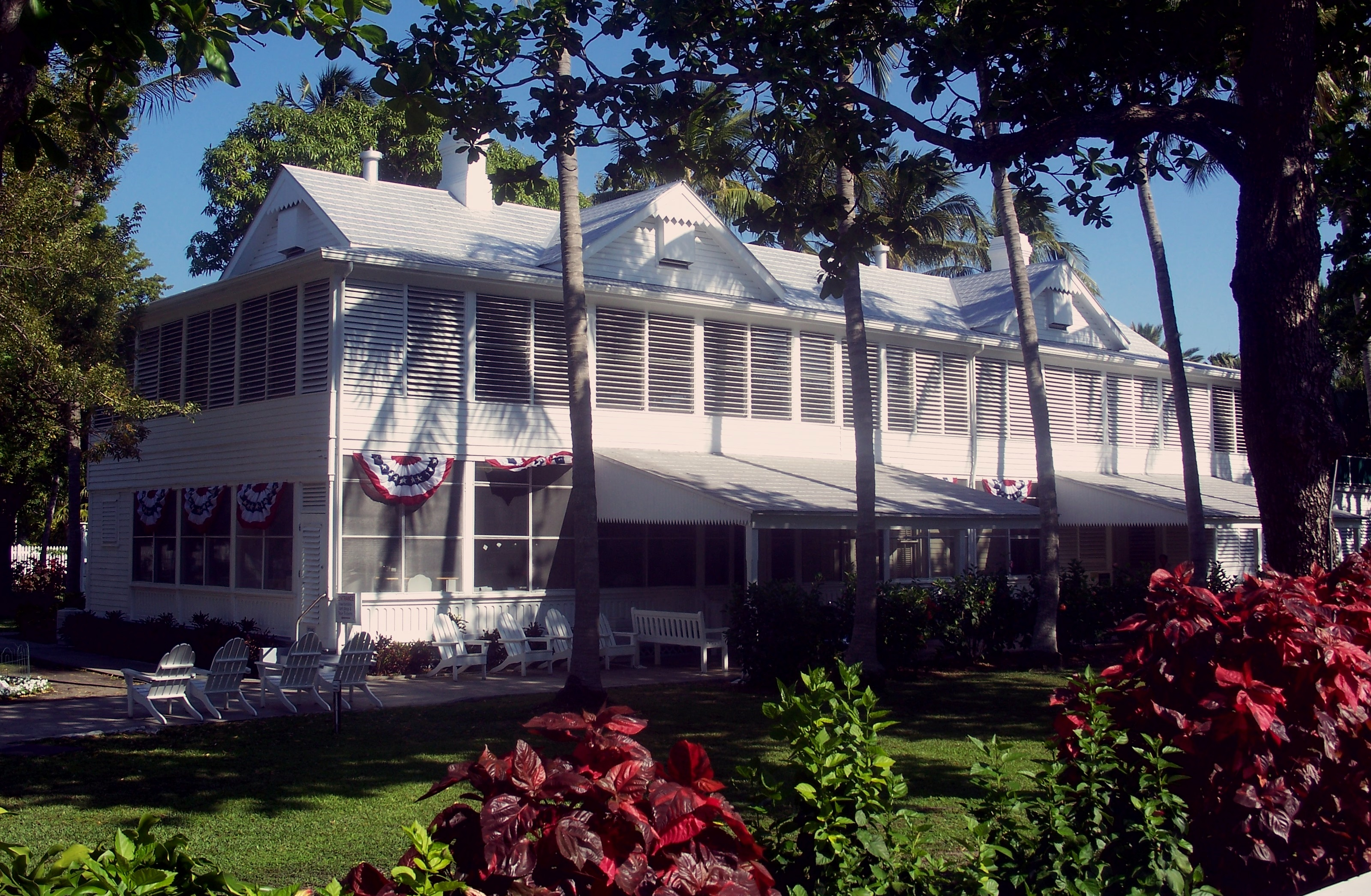
The Little White House

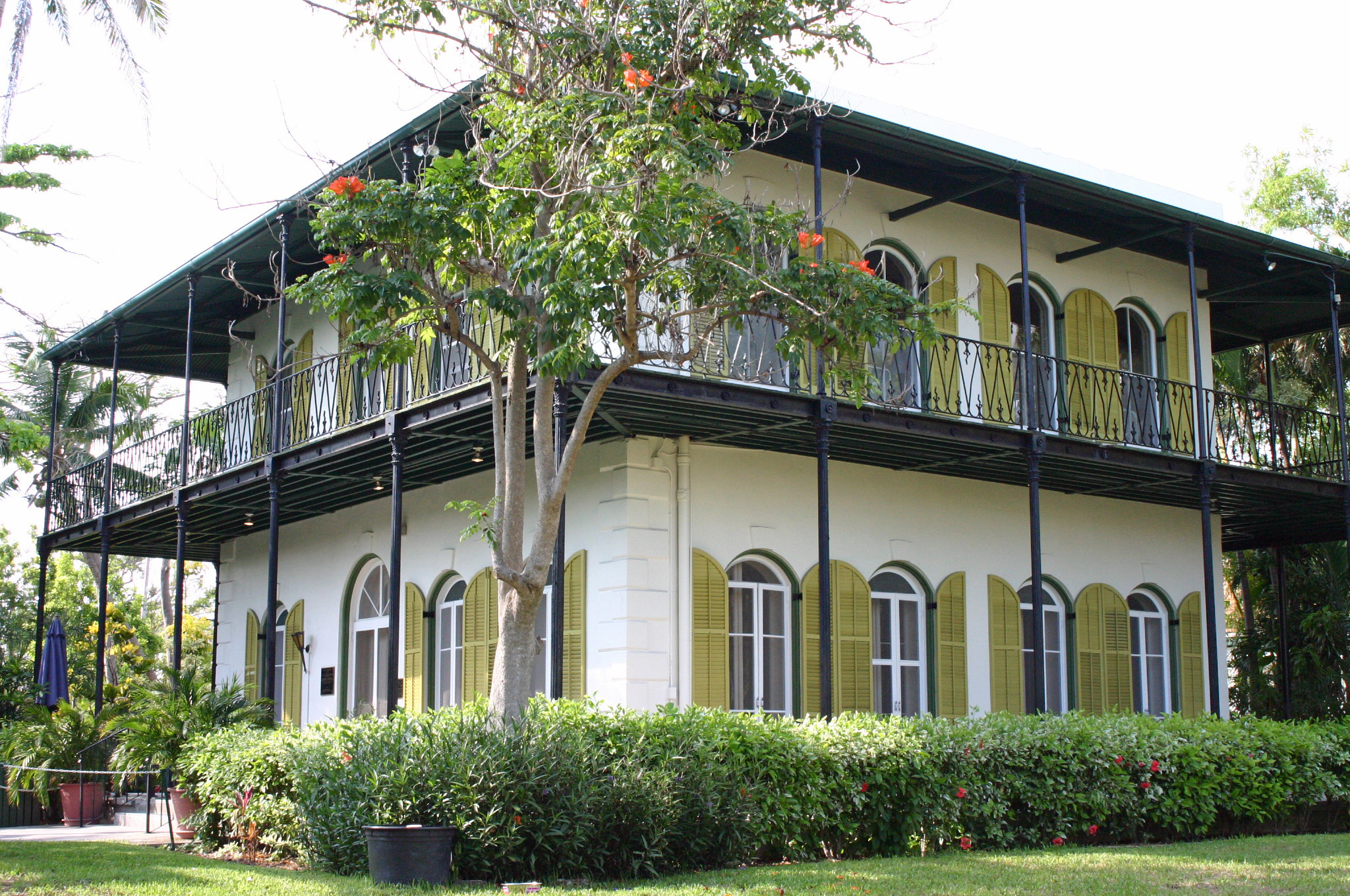
The Ernest Hemingway House

The residence is also known as the Winter White House as Truman stayed there mostly in the winter months, and used it for official business such as the Truman Doctrine. Dwight D. Eisenhower stayed at the Little White House following a heart attack in 1955. John F. Kennedy visited Key West in March 1961, and in November 1962, a month after the resolution of the Cuban Missile Crisis. Jimmy Carter visited the Little White House twice with his family after he had left office, in 1996 and 2007.

==== Ernest Hemingway house ====
Legend has it that Ernest Hemingway wrote part of A Farewell to Arms while living above the showroom of a Key West Ford dealership at 314 Simonton Street while awaiting delivery of a Ford Model A roadster purchased by the uncle of his wife Pauline in 1928. Hardware store owner Charles Thompson introduced him to deep-sea fishing. Among the group who went fishing was Joe Russell (also known as Sloppy Joe). Some scholars believe Russell was the model for Freddy in To Have and Have Not. The group had nicknames for each other, and Hemingway wound up with "Papa". Pauline's rich uncle Gus Pfeiffer bought the 907 Whitehead Street house in 1931 as a wedding present. The Hemingways installed a swimming pool for $20,000 in 1937–38 (equivalent to about $358,278 in 2025). The unexpectedly high cost prompted Hemingway to put a penny in the wet cement of the patio, saying, "Here, take the last penny I've got!" The penny is at the north end of the pool.

During his stay he wrote or worked on Death in the Afternoon, For Whom the Bell Tolls, The Snows of Kilimanjaro, and The Short Happy Life of Francis Macomber. He used Depression-era Key West as one of the locations in To Have and Have Not –his only novel with scenes in the United States.

The six- or seven-toed polydactyl cats descended from Hemingway's original pet "Snowball" still live on the grounds and are cared for at the Hemingway House, despite complaints by the U.S. Department of Agriculture that they are not kept free from visitor contact. The Key West City Commission has exempted the house from a law prohibiting more than four domestic animals per household.

Pauline and Hemingway divorced in 1939; Hemingway only occasionally visited when returning from Havana until his suicide in 1961.

==== Tennessee Williams house ====
Tennessee Williams first became a regular visitor to Key West in 1941 and is said to have written the first draft of A Streetcar Named Desire while staying in 1947 at the La Concha Hotel. He bought a permanent house in 1949 and listed Key West as his primary residence until his death in 1983. In contrast to Hemingway's grand house in Old Town, the Williams home at 1431 Duncan Street in the "unfashionable" New Town neighborhood is a very modest bungalow. The house is privately owned and not open to the public. The Academy Award-winning film version of his play The Rose Tattoo was shot on the island in 1956. The Tennessee Williams Theatre is located on the campus of Florida Keys Community College on Stock Island.

Though Hemingway and Williams lived in Key West at the same time, they reportedly met only once—at Hemingway's home in Cuba, Finca Vigía.

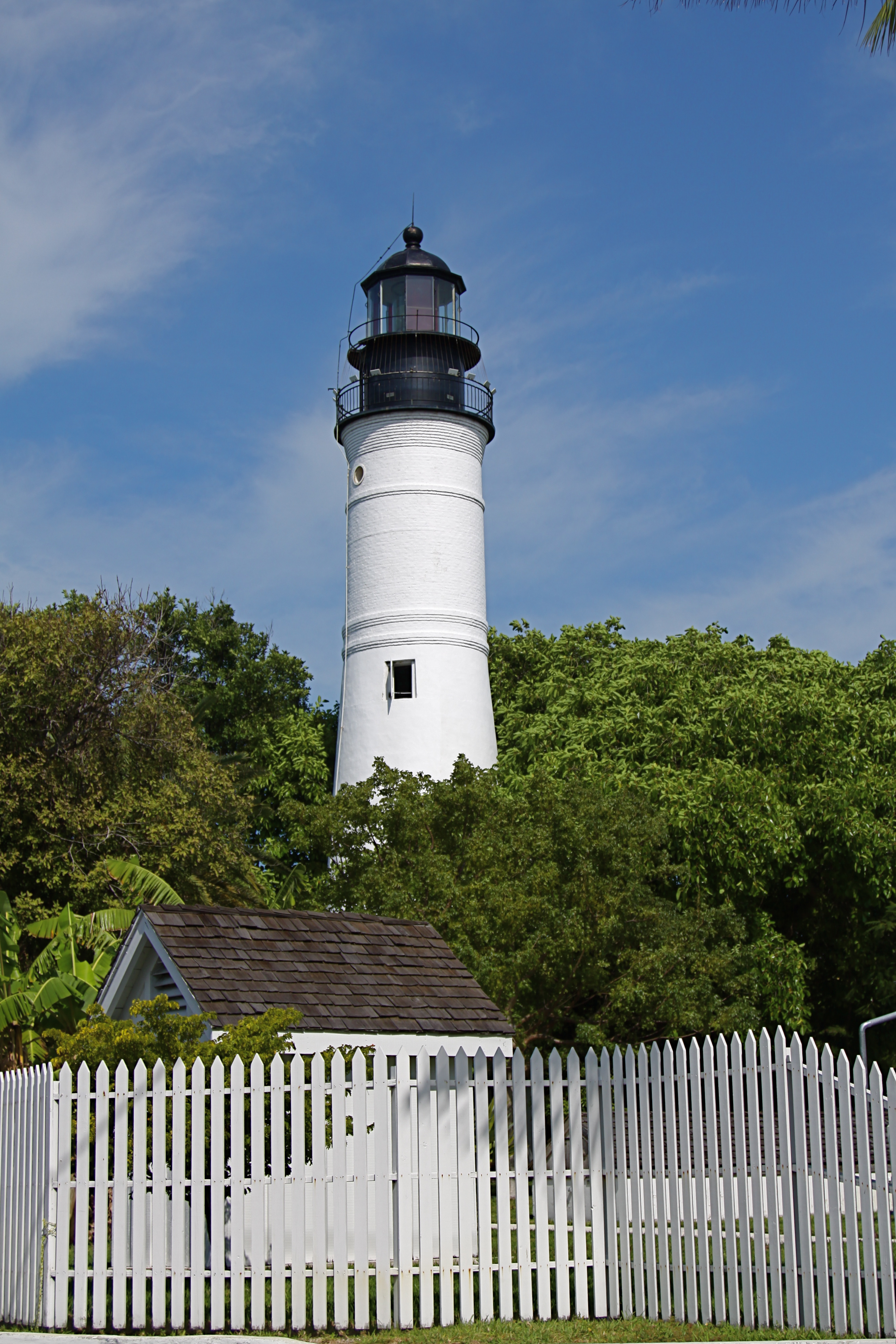
Key West Lighthouse

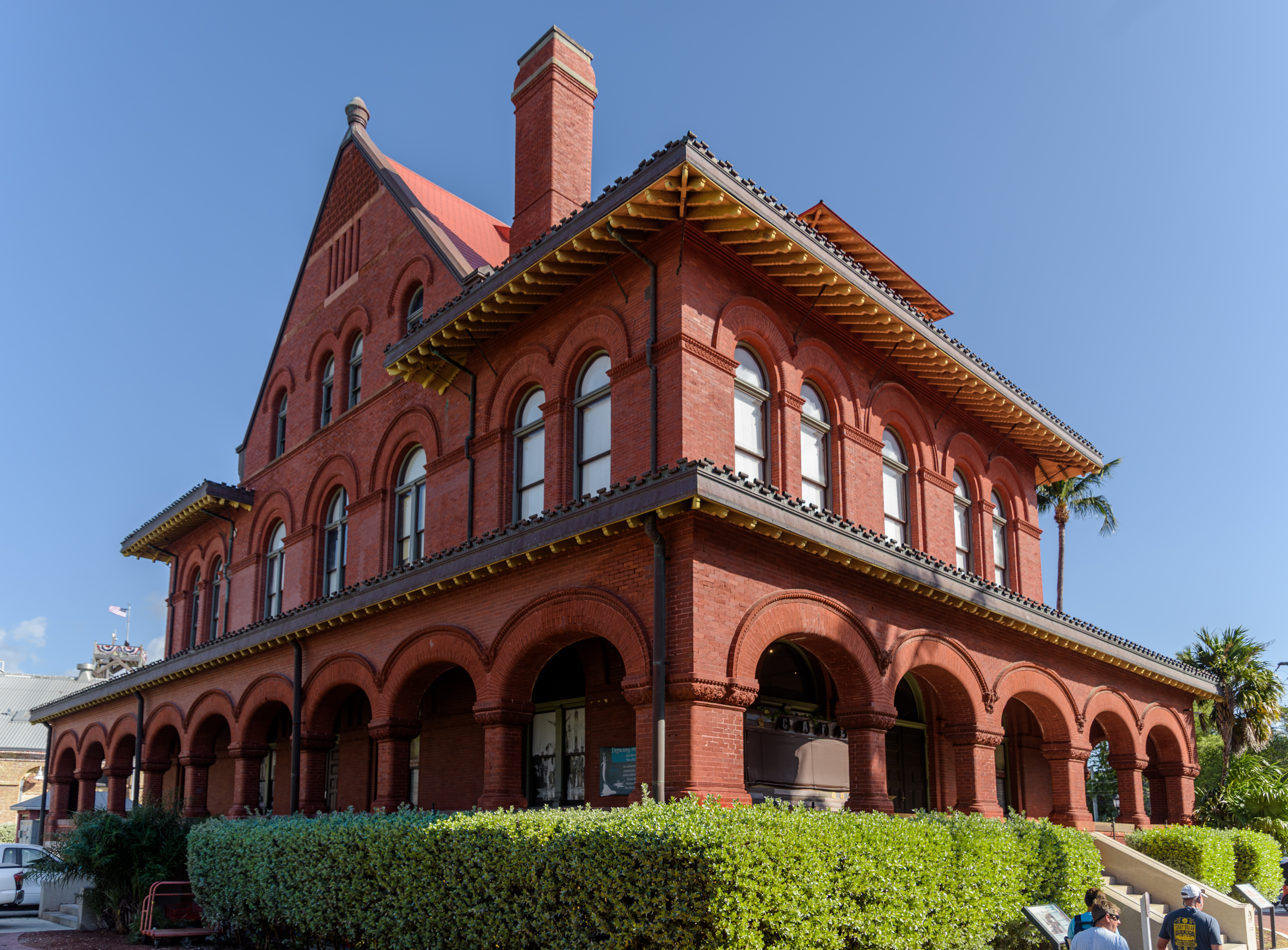
Old Post Office and Customshouse

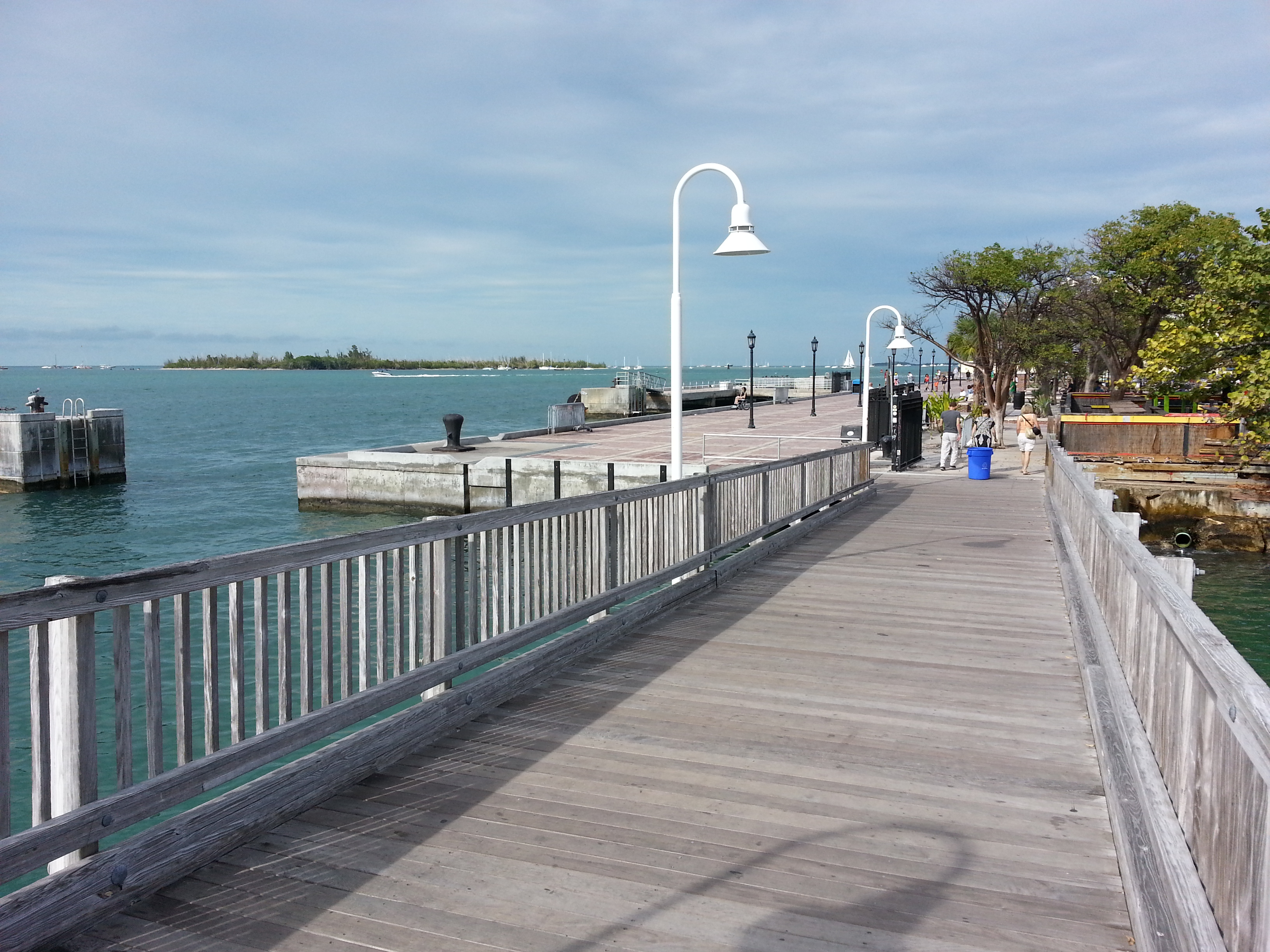
Mallory Square

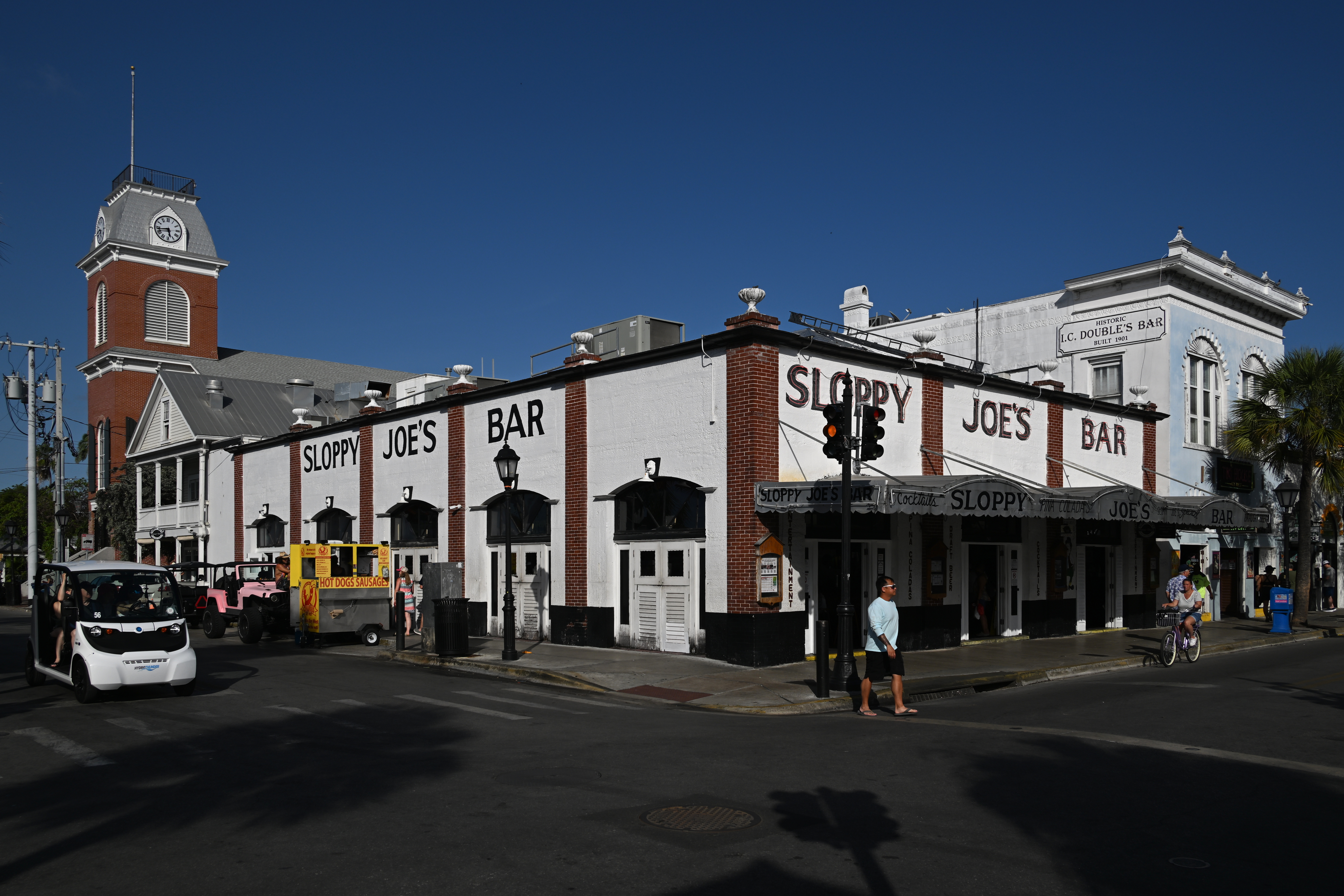
Sloppy Joe's Bar

=== Port of Key West ===
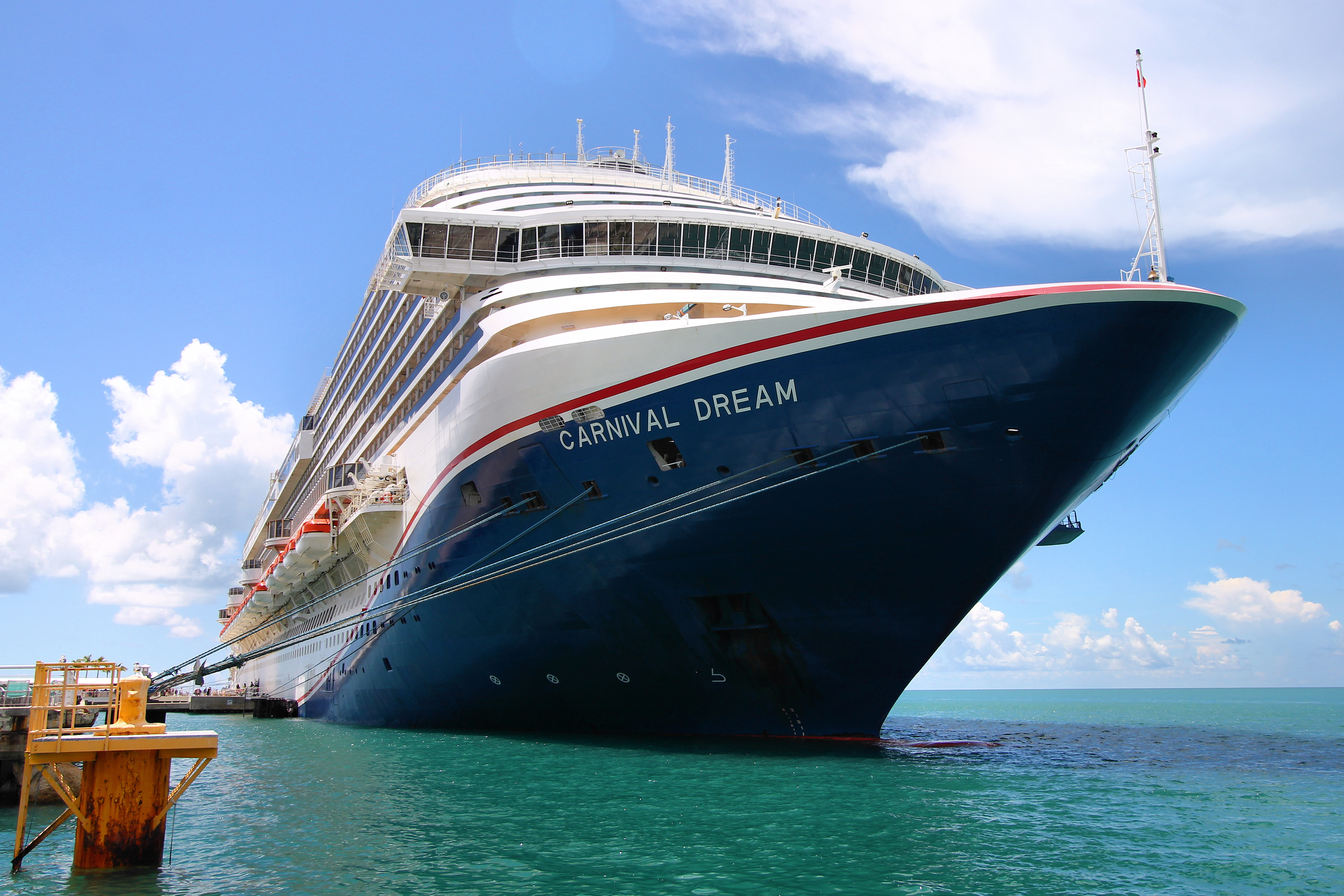
A cruise ship docked at Pier B in Key West

The first cruise ship to adopt the port was the Sunward in 1969. It docked at Pier B, which was owned at that time by the U.S. Navy.

In 1984, the city opened a cruise terminal at Mallory Square. The decision was met with opponents who claimed that it would disrupt the tradition of watching the sunset at Mallory Square.

Today, the Port of Key West includes Key West Bight, Garrison Bight at City Marina, as well as three docks that could be used by cruise ships.

== Climate ==
Key West has a tropical savanna climate (Köppen Aw, similar to many of the Caribbean islands). Like most localities near the edge of the tropics, Key West has a relatively short range in monthly mean temperatures between the coldest month (January) and the hottest month (July), with the annual range of monthly mean temperatures around 15 °F (8.3 °C). The lowest recorded temperature in Key West is 41 °F (5 °C) on January 12, 1886, and January 13, 1981. Key West is located in USDA plant hardiness zone 12a, with an annual mean minimum temperature of 50 °F (10 °C).

Prevailing easterly trade winds and sea breezes suppress the usual summertime heating (while increasing the winter rainfall), with temperatures rarely reaching 95 °F (35 °C). There are 56 days per year with 90 °F (32 °C) or greater highs, with the average window for such readings June 8 through September 24, shorter than almost the entire southeastern U.S. Low temperatures often remain above 80 °F (27 °C), however. The all-time record high temperature is 97 °F (36 °C) on July 19, 1880, and August 29, 1956.

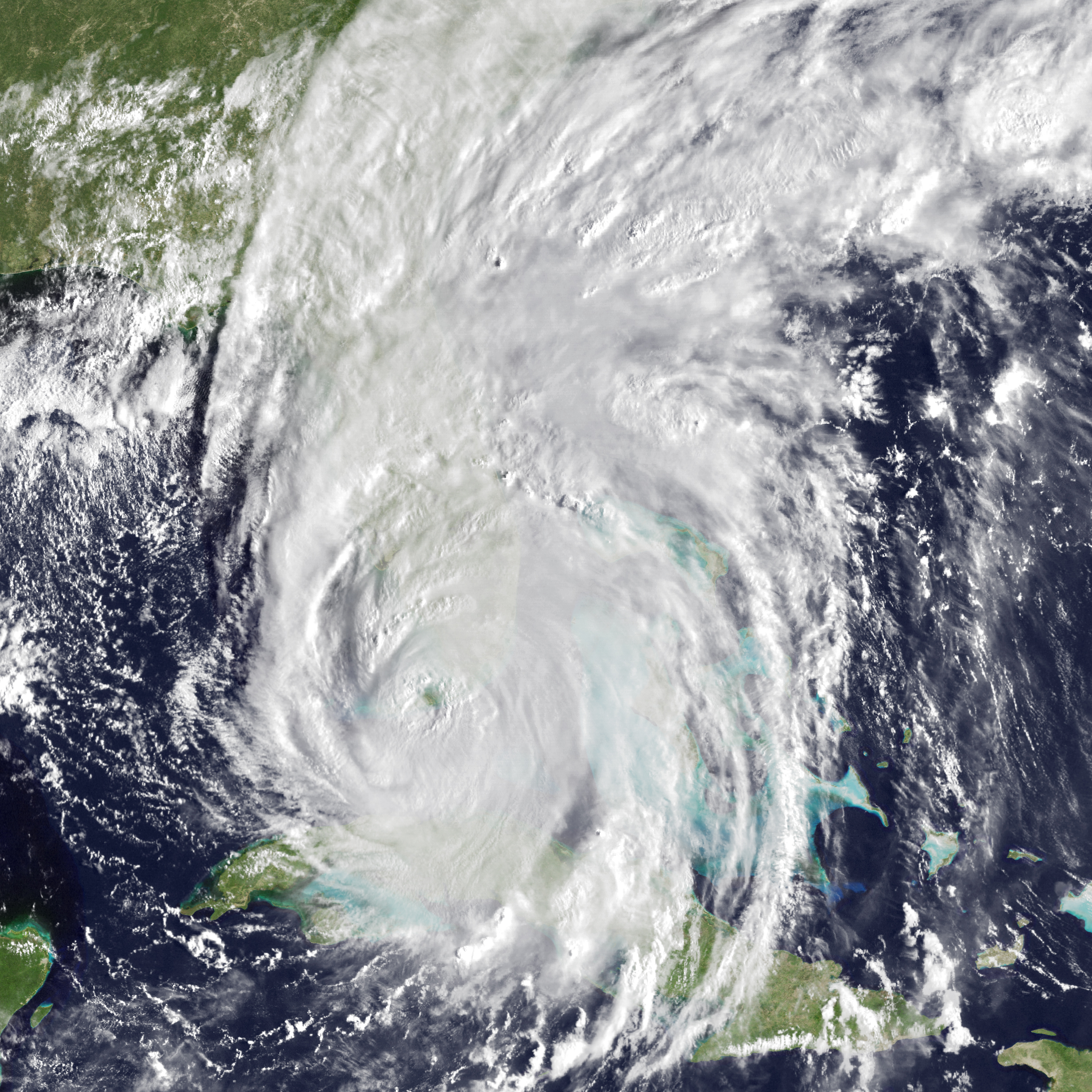
Hurricane Irma crosses over Key West in 2017

=== Wet and dry seasons ===
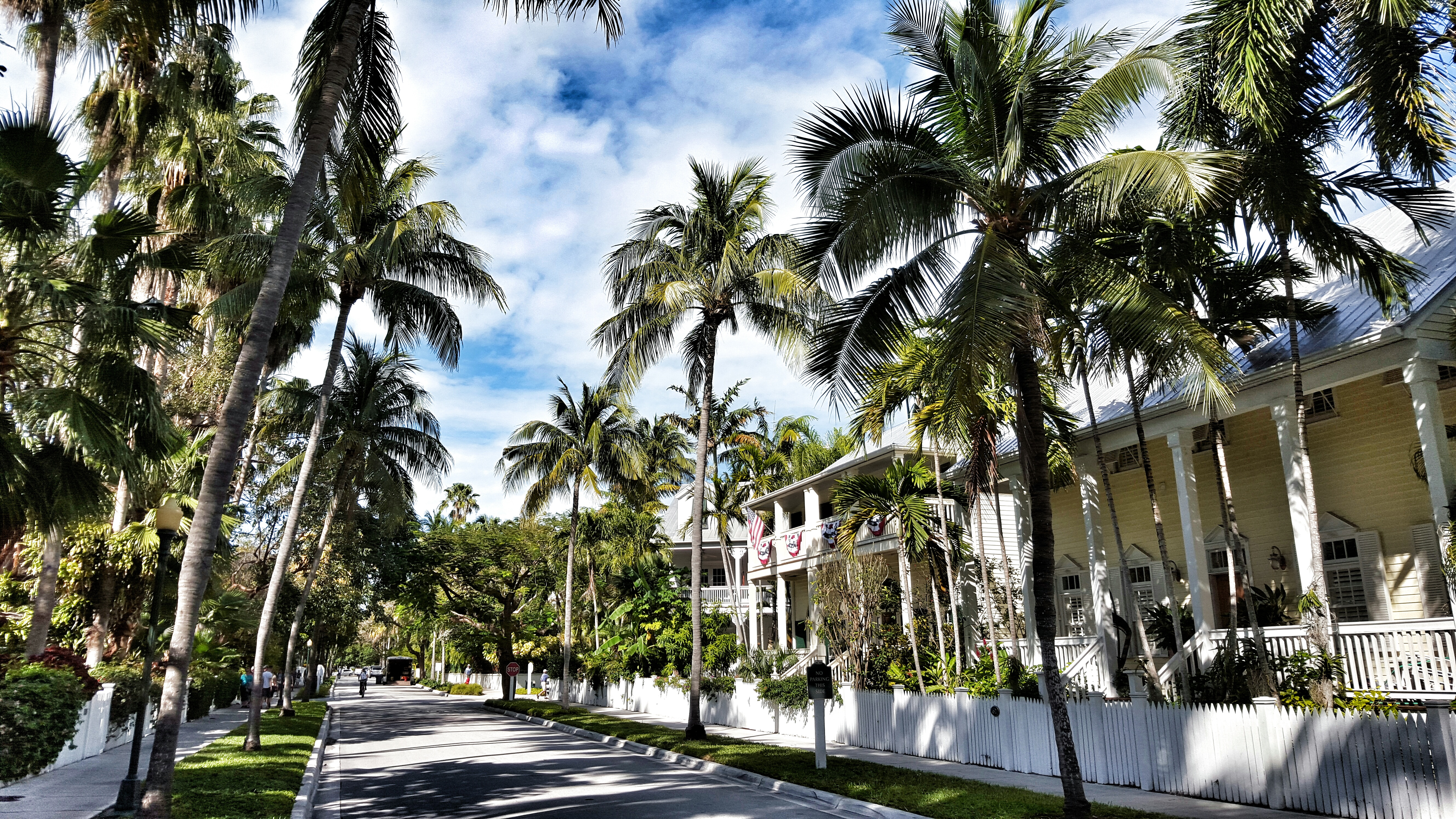
Palm trees along a street in the Truman Annex

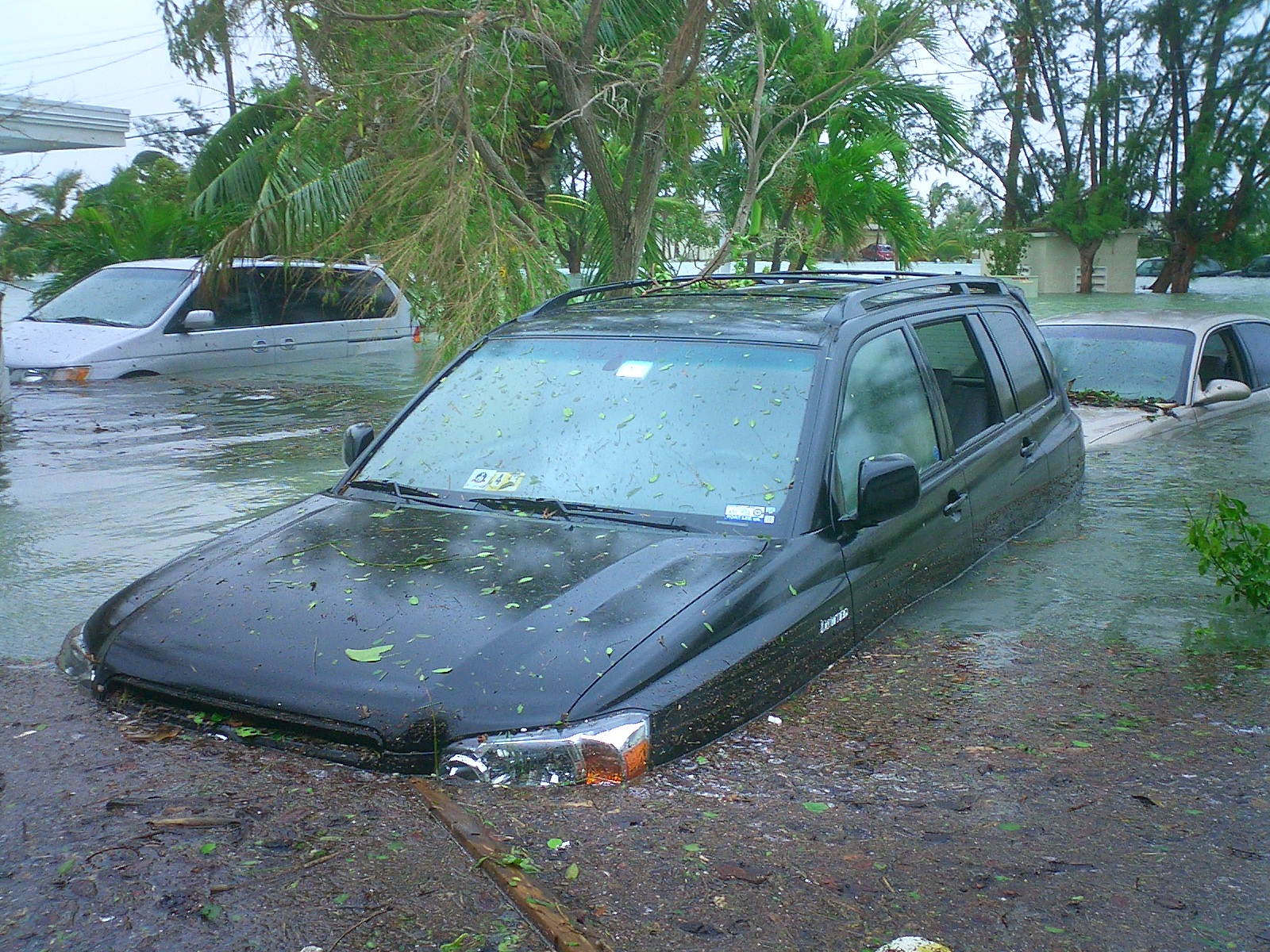
Flooding caused by Hurricane Wilma on Key Haven, island suburb of the City of Key West on Raccoon Key (October 24, 2005)

Like most tropical climates, Key West has a two-season wet and dry climate. The period from November through April is normally sunny and fairly dry, with only 25 percent of the annual rainfall occurring. May through October is normally the wet season. During the wet season some rain falls on most days, often as brief, but heavy tropical downpours, followed by intense sun. Early morning is the favored time for these showers, which is different from mainland Florida, where showers and thunderstorms usually occur in the afternoon.

Easterly (tropical) waves during this season occasionally bring excessive rainfall, while infrequent hurricanes may be accompanied by unusually heavy amounts. On average, rainfall markedly peaks between August and October; the single wettest month in Key West is September, when the threat from tropical weather systems (hurricanes, tropical storms and tropical depressions) is greatest. Key West is the driest city in Florida, averaging just over 40 inches (1,000 mm) of rain per year. This is driven primarily by Key West's relative dryness in May, June and July. In mainland Florida peninsular areas like Orlando, Tampa/St. Petersburg and Fort Myers, June and July average monthly rainfalls typically reach 7 to 10 inches (180 to 250 mm), while Key West has only half such amounts over the same period.

=== Hurricanes ===
Key West, like the rest of the Florida Keys, is vulnerable to hurricanes. The most recent hurricane to impact Key West was Hurricane Irma, which made landfall in the Keys in the morning of September 10, 2017, as a Category 4 storm.

Some locals maintain that Hurricane Wilma on October 24, 2005, was the worst storm in memory. The entire island was told to evacuate and business owners were forced to shut their doors. After the hurricane had passed, the resulting storm surge sent eight feet (two meters) of water inland completely inundating a large portion of the lower Keys. Low-lying areas of Key West and the lower Keys, including major tourist destinations, were under as much as three feet (one meter) of water. Sixty percent of the homes in Key West were flooded. The higher parts of Old Town, such as the Solares Hill and cemetery areas, did not flood, because of their higher elevations of 12 to 18 feet (4 to 5 m). The surge destroyed tens of thousands of cars throughout the lower Keys, and many houses were flooded with one to two feet (thirty to sixty-one centimeters) of sea water. A local newspaper referred to Key West and the lower Keys as a "car graveyard". The peak of the storm surge occurred when the eye of Wilma had already passed over the Naples area, and the sustained winds during the surge were less than 40 mph (64 km/h; 35 kn). The storm destroyed the piers at the clothing-optional Atlantic Shores Motel and breached the shark tank at the Key West Aquarium, freeing its sharks. Damage postponed the island's famous Halloween Fantasy Fest until the following December. MTV's The Real World: Key West was filming during the hurricane and deals with the storm.

In September 2005, NOAA opened its National Weather Service forecast office building on White Street. The building is designed to withstand a Category 5 hurricane and its storm surge. The most intense previous hurricane was Hurricane Georges, a Category 2, in September 1998. The storm damaged many of the houseboats along "Houseboat Row" on South Roosevelt Boulevard near Cow Key channel on the east side of the island.

Climate chart for Key West

Climate data for Key West Int'l, Florida (1991–2020 normals, (Note: Mean monthly maxima and minima (i.e. the highest and lowest temperature readings during an entire month or year) calculated based on data at said location from 1991 to 2020.) extremes 1872−present) (Note: Official records for Key West were kept at the Weather Bureau in downtown from January 1871 to February 1958, and at Key West Int'l since March 1958. For more information, see ThreadEx.)
Month	Jan	Feb	Mar	Apr	May	Jun	Jul	Aug	Sep	Oct	Nov	Dec	Year
Record high °F (°C)	90 (32)	87 (31)	89 (32)	91 (33)	94 (34)	96 (36)	97 (36)	97 (36)	95 (35)	93 (34)	91 (33)	88 (31)	97 (36)
Mean maximum °F (°C)	81.9 (27.7)	82.5 (28.1)	84.1 (28.9)	86.2 (30.1)	88.8 (31.6)	91.0 (32.8)	92.2 (33.4)	92.3 (33.5)	91.5 (33.1)	89.1 (31.7)	85.4 (29.7)	82.9 (28.3)	92.7 (33.7)
Mean daily maximum °F (°C)	75.8 (24.3)	77.4 (25.2)	79.6 (26.4)	82.6 (28.1)	85.9 (29.9)	88.7 (31.5)	90.2 (32.3)	90.6 (32.6)	89.0 (31.7)	85.8 (29.9)	81.0 (27.2)	77.7 (25.4)	83.7 (28.7)
Daily mean °F (°C)	70.6 (21.4)	72.3 (22.4)	74.4 (23.6)	77.9 (25.5)	81.1 (27.3)	84.1 (28.9)	85.4 (29.7)	85.5 (29.7)	84.1 (28.9)	81.3 (27.4)	76.6 (24.8)	73.0 (22.8)	78.9 (26.1)
Mean daily minimum °F (°C)	65.5 (18.6)	67.1 (19.5)	69.3 (20.7)	73.1 (22.8)	76.4 (24.7)	79.4 (26.3)	80.6 (27.0)	80.5 (26.9)	79.2 (26.2)	76.8 (24.9)	72.2 (22.3)	68.3 (20.2)	74.0 (23.3)
Mean minimum °F (°C)	51.8 (11.0)	55.0 (12.8)	58.5 (14.7)	63.6 (17.6)	69.5 (20.8)	73.5 (23.1)	74.5 (23.6)	74.1 (23.4)	74.1 (23.4)	69.3 (20.7)	62.4 (16.9)	56.6 (13.7)	50.1 (10.1)
Record low °F (°C)	41 (5)	44 (7)	47 (8)	48 (9)	63 (17)	65 (18)	68 (20)	68 (20)	64 (18)	59 (15)	49 (9)	44 (7)	41 (5)
Average precipitation inches (mm)	1.83 (46)	1.54 (39)	1.53 (39)	2.07 (53)	3.12 (79)	4.23 (107)	3.63 (92)	5.37 (136)	7.24 (184)	5.67 (144)	2.05 (52)	2.15 (55)	40.44 (1,027)
Average precipitation days (≥ 0.01 in)	6.9	4.9	4.8	4.5	7.5	11.2	11.6	14.6	15.8	12.1	6.3	6.4	106.6
Average relative humidity (%)	76.0	74.3	73.0	70.1	71.8	74.0	72.2	73.4	75.3	75.1	76.0	76.2	74.0
Average dew point °F (°C)	61.3 (16.3)	61.2 (16.2)	63.9 (17.7)	65.8 (18.8)	70.0 (21.1)	73.6 (23.1)	74.3 (23.5)	74.7 (23.7)	74.3 (23.5)	70.9 (21.6)	66.7 (19.3)	63.1 (17.3)	68.3 (20.2)
Mean monthly sunshine hours	249.6	245.4	308.8	324.6	340.3	314.0	325.2	306.6	269.6	254.7	230.9	234.5	3,404.2
Percentage possible sunshine	75	77	83	85	82	77	78	76	73	71	70	71	77
Source: NOAA (relative humidity, dew point and sun 1961−1990)

Climate data for Key West
Month	Jan	Feb	Mar	Apr	May	Jun	Jul	Aug	Sep	Oct	Nov	Dec	Year
Average sea temperature °F (°C)	71.2 (21.8)	71.2 (21.8)	73.2 (22.9)	77.7 (25.4)	80.6 (27.0)	83.3 (28.5)	85.5 (29.7)	86.9 (30.5)	85.5 (29.7)	82.8 (28.2)	78.4 (25.8)	74.5 (23.6)	79.2 (26.2)
Mean daily daylight hours	11.0	11.0	12.0	13.0	13.0	14.0	13.0	13.0	12.0	12.0	11.0	11.0	12.2
Average Ultraviolet index	6	8	10	11	11	11	11	11	10	9	7	6	9.3
Source: Weather Atlas

See or edit raw graph data.

== Demographics ==
Historical population
Census	Pop.	Note	%±
1840	688		—
1850	2,367		244.0%
1860	2,832		19.6%
1870	5,016		77.1%
1880	9,890		97.2%
1890	18,080		82.8%
1900	17,114		−5.3%
1910	19,945		16.5%
1920	18,749		−6.0%
1930	12,831		−31.6%
1940	12,927		0.7%
1950	26,433		104.5%
1960	33,956		28.5%
1970	29,312		−13.7%
1980	24,382		−16.8%
1990	24,832		1.8%
2000	25,478		2.6%
2010	24,649		−3.3%
2020	26,444		7.3%
U.S. Decennial Census

=== 2010 and 2020 census ===
Key West racial composition (Hispanics excluded from racial categories) (NH = Non-Hispanic)
Race	Pop 2010	Pop 2020	% 2010	% 2020
White (NH)	16,286	16,160	66.07%	61.11%
Black or African American (NH)	2,215	2,562	8.99%	9.69%
Native American or Alaska Native (NH)	84	59	0.34%	0.22%
Asian (NH)	386	609	1.57%	2.30%
Pacific Islander or Native Hawaiian (NH)	34	35	0.14%	0.13%
Some other race (NH)	44	186	0.18%	0.70%
Two or more races/Multiracial (NH)	372	904	1.51%	3.42%
Hispanic or Latino (any race)	5,228	5,929	21.21%	22.42%
Total	24,649	26,444		

As of the 2020 United States census, there were 26,444 people, 10,788 households, and 5,701 families residing in the city.

As of the 2010 United States census, there were 24,649 people, 9,388 households, and 4,813 families residing in the city.

Ancestry in Key West (2014–2018)
Ancestral origin:	Percent:
English American (including "American" ancestry)	14%
Cuban American	12.7%
German American	10.1%
Irish American	7.9%
Italian American	6.2%
West Indian Americans (excluding Hispanic groups)	5.7%
African American	4.8%
Mexican American	4.2%
Central American	4%
Polish American	3.7%
Scottish American (including Scots-Irish)	2.8%
Scandinavian Americans (including Icelandic, Finnish, and Baltic)	2.8%
Puerto Rican American	2.7%
Central European (including Hungarian, Slovak, Slovenian, Czech, etc.)	2.3%

=== 2000 census ===
As of the census of 2000, there were 25,478 people, 11,016 households, and 5,463 families residing in the city. The population density is 1,653.3/km^{2} (4,285.0/mi^{2}). There are 13,306 housing units at an average density of 863.4/km^{2} (2,237.9/mi^{2}). The racial makeup of the city was 84.94% White, 9.28% Black or African American, 0.39% Native American, 1.29% Asian, 0.05% Pacific Islander, 1.86% from other races, and 2.18% from two or more races. 16.54% of the population were Hispanic or Latino of any race.

In 2000, there were 10,501 households, out of which 19.9% had children under the age of 18 living with them, 37.7% were married couples living together, 8.2% had a female householder with no husband present, and 50.4% were classified as non-families. Of all households, 31.4% were made up of individuals, and 8.1% had someone living alone who was 65 years of age or older. The average household size was 2.23 and the average family size was 2.84.

In 2000, 16.0% of the population was under the age of 18, 8.4% was from 18 to 24, 37.1% from 25 to 44, 26.7% from 45 to 64, and 11.7% was 65 years of age or older. The median age was 39 years. For every 100 females, there were 122.3 males. For every 100 females age 18 and over, there were 126.0 males.

In 2000, the median income for a household was $43,021, and the median income for those classified as families was $50,895. Males had a median income of $30,967 versus $25,407 for females. The per capita income for the city was $26,316. About 5.8% of families and 10.2% of the population were below the poverty line, including 11.5% of those under age 18 and 11.3% of those age 65 or over. The ancestries most reported in 2000 were English (12.4%), German (12.2%), Irish (11.3%), Italian (6.8%), American (6.0%) and French (3.6%).

The number of families (as defined by the US census bureau) declined dramatically in the last four decades of the 20th century. In 1960, there were 13,340 families in Key West, with 42.1% of households having children living in them. By 2000, the population had dwindled to 5,463 families, with only 19.9% of households having children living in them.

As of 2000, 76.66% spoke only English at home, while Spanish was spoken by 17.32%, 1.06% spoke Italian, 1.02% spoke French, and German was spoken as a by 0.94% of the population. In total, speakers of other languages spoken besides English made up 25.33% of residents.

=== "Conchs" ===
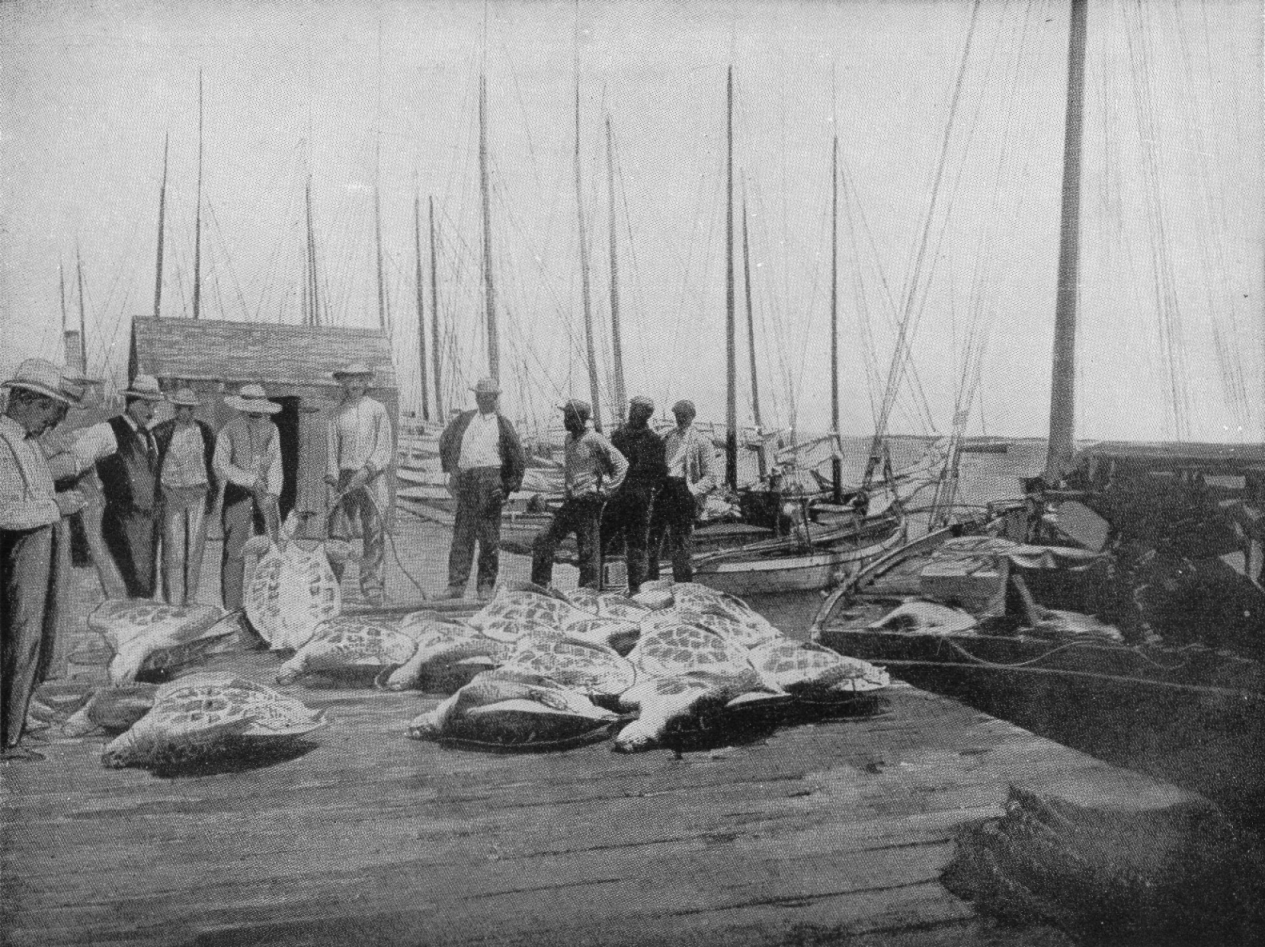
Captured sea turtles in Key West, circa 1900

Many of the early residents of Key West were immigrants from the Bahamas, known as Conchs (pronounced "conks"'), who arrived in increasing numbers after 1830. Many were sons and daughters of Loyalists who fled to the nearest Crown soil during the American Revolution. In the 20th century many residents of Key West started referring to themselves as Conchs, and the term is now generally applied to all residents of Key West. Some residents use the term "Conch" (or, alternatively, "Saltwater Conch") to refer to a person born in Key West, while the term "Freshwater Conch" refers to a resident not born in Key West but who has lived in Key West for seven years or more. The true original meaning of Conch applies only to someone with European ancestry who immigrated from the Bahamas, however. It is said that when a baby was born, the family would put a conch shell on a pole in front of their home.

Many of the black Bahamian immigrants who arrived later lived in Bahama Village, an area of Old Town next to the Truman Annex.

=== Cuban presence ===
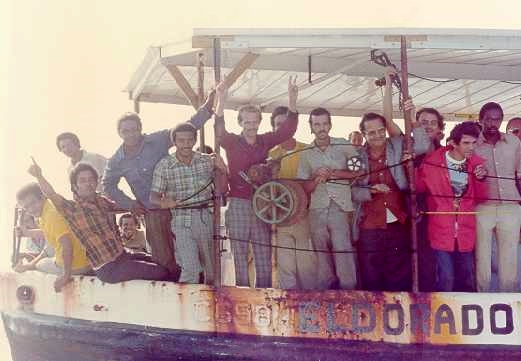
Boat crowded with Cuban refugees arrives in Key West during the 1980 Mariel Boatlift.

Key West is closer to Havana (106 miles or 171 kilometres) than it is to Miami (130 mi; 210 km). In 1890, Key West had a population of nearly 18,800 and was the biggest and richest city in Florida. Half the residents were said to be of Cuban origin, and Key West regularly had Cuban mayors, including the son of Carlos Manuel de Céspedes, father of the Cuban Republic, who was elected mayor in 1876. Cubans were actively involved in reportedly 200 factories in town, producing 100 million cigars annually. José Martí made several visits to seek recruits for Cuban independence starting in 1891 and founded the Cuban Revolutionary Party during his visits to Key West.

Key West received a large number of refugees during the Mariel Boatlift. Refugees continue to come ashore and, on at least one occasion, most notably in April 2003, flew hijacked Cuban Airlines planes into the city's airport.

=== Culture and diversity ===
With a wide variety of cultures, including Conchs, Cuban refugees and British immigrants, Key West is one of the most culturally diverse cities in Florida. The city has become a place where artists, LGBT, and people from all backgrounds and lifestyles feel welcome, reflecting the city's motto of One Human Family. Key West has one of the largest gay pride communities, with gay-oriented hotels, bars, and two annual pride festivals.

== Government and politics ==
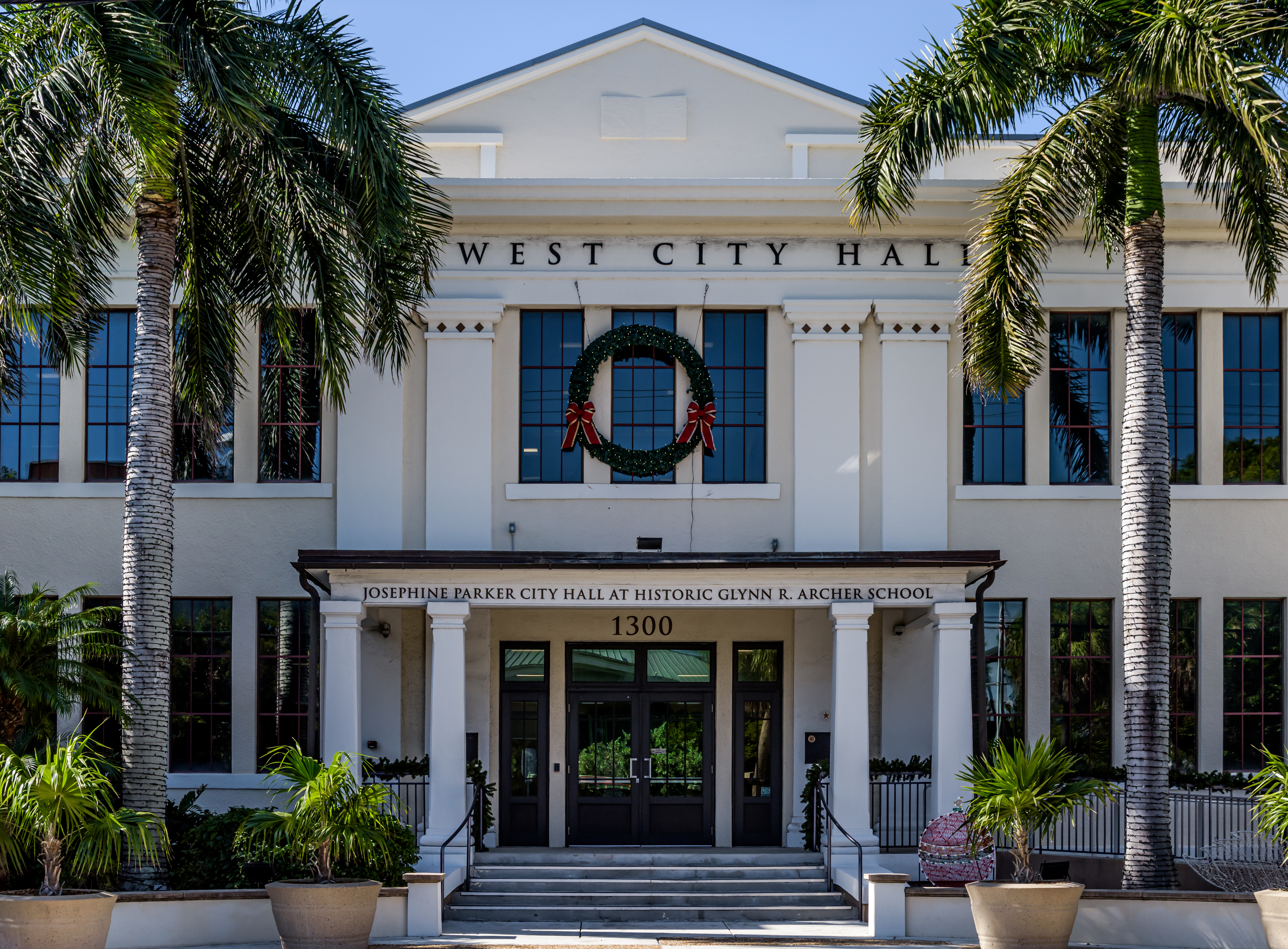
Key West City Hall, 2025

Key West is governed via a mayor-council system. The city council is known as the city commission. It consists of six members each elected from individual districts. The mayor is elected in a citywide vote.

=== Mayors ===
Mayors of Key West have reflected the city's cultural and ethnic heritage. It has had mayors of Cuban ancestry and others that were openly gay. One mayor is famous for having water-skied to Cuba.

== Military presence ==
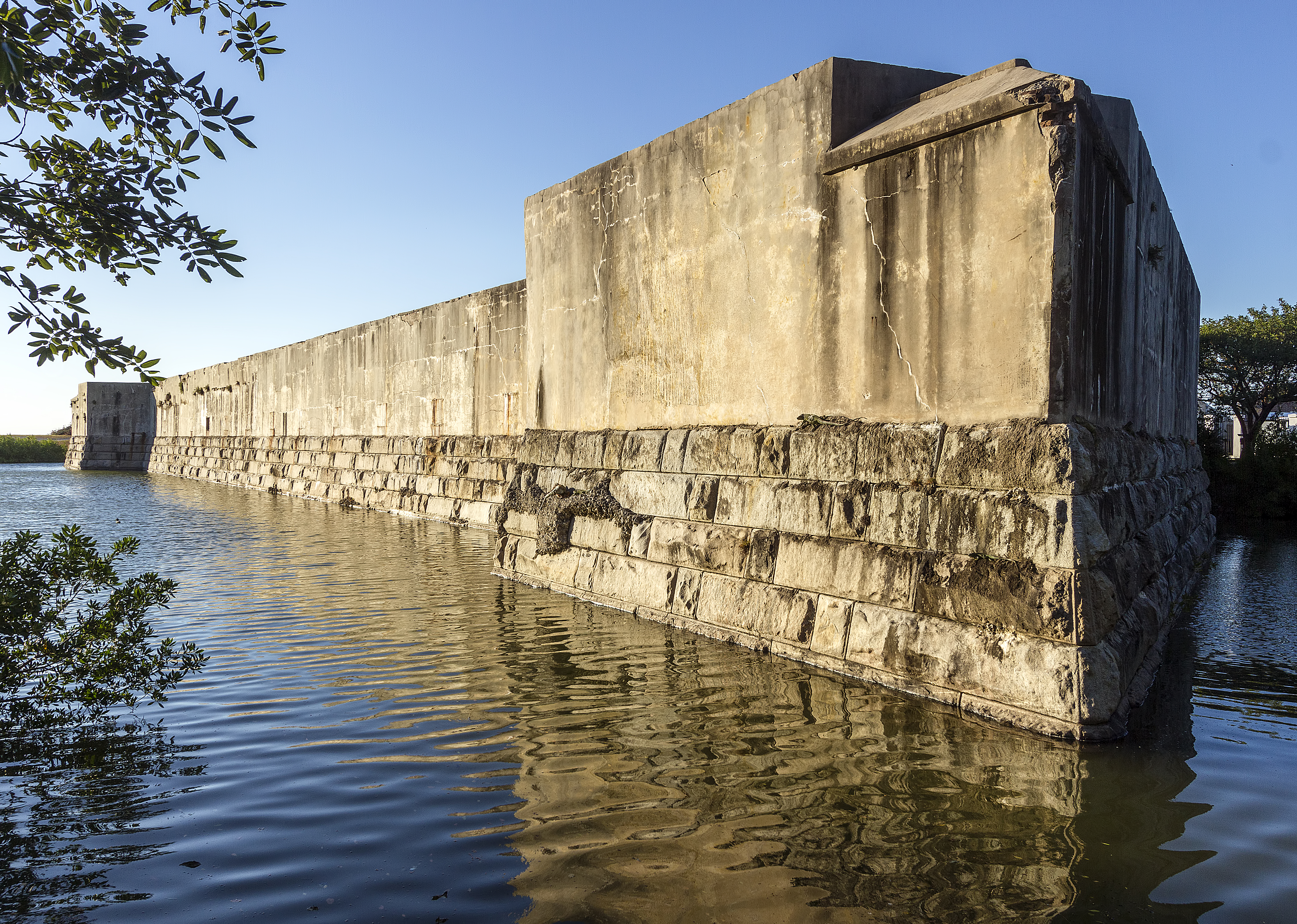
Fort Zachary Taylor in Key West, active during the Civil War, contains the largest collection of Civil War cannons ever discovered at a single location.

NAS Key West, Boca Chica and the Truman Annex have been the home of U.S. ships, submarines, Pegasus-class hydrofoils, Fighter Training Squadrons like the current VFC-111 "Sundowners", and Light Photographic Reconnaissance Squadrons like the former VFP-62 "Fighting Photos" during the Cuban Missile Crisis. NAS Key West is still a training facility for US Naval Aviation personnel.

Key West has had a military presence since 1823, shortly after its purchase by Simonton in 1822. John W. Simonton lobbied the U.S. government to establish a naval base on Key West, both to take advantage of its strategic location and to bring law and order to the Key West town. On March 25, 1822, naval officer Matthew C. Perry sailed the schooner Shark to Key West and planted the U.S. flag claiming the Keys as United States property. In 1823, a naval base was established to protect shipping merchants in the lower keys from pirates that would eventually evolve through the Civil War, the Spanish American War, two world wars, and the Cold War as Naval Station Key West, eventually home to the Fleet Sonar School, Marine Barracks Key West, Submarine Squadron 4, Submarine Squadron 12, Destroyer Squadron 12, and various diesel-powered submarines and surface ships.

NAVSTA Key West was closed in 1974 as part of post-Vietnam War force reductions across the Department of Defense. A portion of the original NAVSTA Key West still remains under Navy control as Naval Air Station Key West-Truman Annex while a portion containing Fort Zachary Taylor was conveyed to the State of Florida as Fort Zachary Taylor State Park. The Truman Little White House has also been preserved as a museum based on its history as a part-time residence of President Harry S. Truman during his presidency. The remainder of the original base was conveyed to civilian control for redevelopment and now comprises The Key West Amphitheater, Truman Waterfront Park, residential redevelopment consisting of both homes and condominiums, and a portion of Mallory Square.

Key West was always an important military post, since it sits at the northern edge of the deepwater channel connecting the Atlantic and the Gulf of Mexico (the southern edge 90 miles [140 km] away is Cuba) via the Florida Straits. Because of this, Key West since the 1820s had been dubbed the "Gibraltar of the West". Fort Taylor was initially built on the island. The Navy added a small base from which USS Maine sailed to its demise in Havana at the beginning of the Spanish–American War which later evolved into NAVSTA Key West.

=== Naval Air Station Key West ===
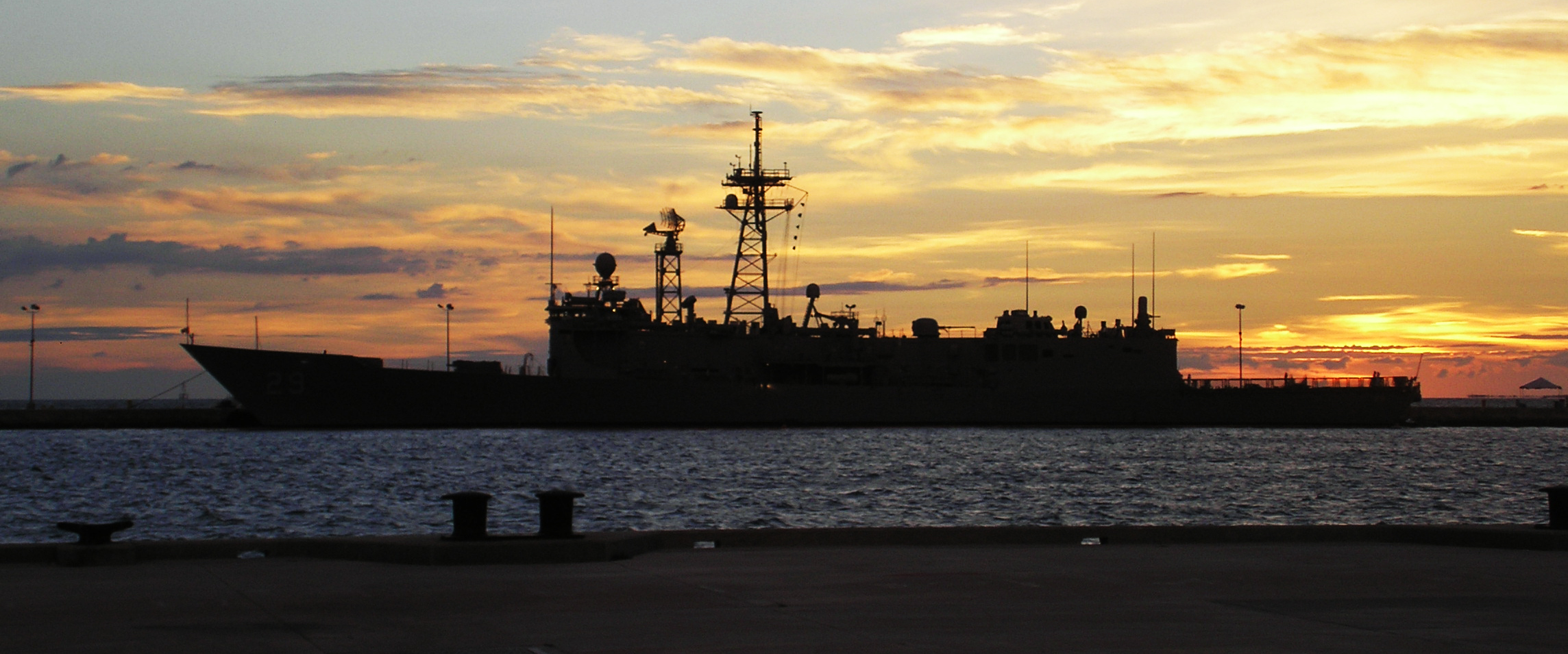
USS Stephen W. Groves (FFG-29) as seen at sunset in Key West on July 22, 2007. This ship is typical of the frigates, destroyers, and smaller military vessels that call at the port. Larger ships, such as aircraft carriers, are prohibited because of their deep draft and the shallowness of the harbor.

At the beginning of World War II the Navy increased its presence from 50 to 3,000 acres (20 to 1,214 hectares), including all of Boca Chica Key's 1,700 acres (690 ha) and the construction of Fleming Key from landfill. The Navy built the first water pipeline extending the length of the Keys, bringing fresh water from the mainland to supply its bases. At its peak 15,000 military personnel and 3,400 civilians were at the base. Included in the base are:

- Naval Air Station Key West – This is the main facility on Boca Chica. The air station's primary purpose is readiness training for carrier-based strike fighter, electronic attack and carrier airborne early warning squadrons of the U.S. Atlantic Fleet and U.S. Pacific Fleet, primarily via the Fleet Fighter Aircrew Readiness Program (FFARP), honing the skills of Naval Aviators and Naval Flight Officers in air combat training prior to overseas deployment. An additional squadron permanently based at NAS Key West, Fighter Composite Squadron 111 (VFC-111), is composed of both active duty and Navy Reserve pilots who fly F-5 Tiger II aircraft as simulated enemy aggressors in Dissimilar Air Combat Training (DACT) for Fleet aircrews, primarily using the offshore Key West Tactical Air Crew Training System (TACTS) Range. Permanent party officer and enlisted personnel assigned to NAS Key West are primarily housed at the Navy's Sigsbee Park housing area eight miles to the west or in private housing on the local economy. In 2006 there were 1,650 active duty personnel; 2,507 family members; 35 Reserve members; and 1,312 civilians listed at the base. In the 1990s the Navy worked out an agreement with the National Park Service to eliminate sonic booms in the vicinity of Fort Jefferson in the Dry Tortugas. Many of the training missions are directed at the Marquesas "Patricia" Target 29 nautical miles (54 km) due west of the base. The target is a grounded ship hulk 306 feet (93 m) in length that is visible only at low tide. Bombs are not actually dropped on the target.
- Truman Annex – The area next to Fort Taylor became a submarine pen and was used for the Fleet Sonar School. President Harry S. Truman was to make the commandant's house his winter White House. The Fort Taylor Annex was later renamed the Truman Annex. This portion has largely been decommissioned, with Fort Zachary Taylor conveyed to the State of Florida as a state park and the remainder turned over to private developers and the city of Key West. There are still a few military and U.S. government offices and facilities there, including the new NOAA Hurricane Forecasting Center and the military headquarters for Joint Interagency Task Force South, an element of U.S. Southern Command. The Navy still owns its piers.
- Trumbo Point Annex – The docking area on what had been the railroad yard for Flagler's Overseas Railroad is now used by the Coast Guard as Coast Guard Sector Key West and Coast Guard Station Key West, to include being the homeport for several Coast Guard cutters. It is also home to the Bachelor Officers Quarters (BOQ) for NAS Key West and contains additional married family military housing.

== Media ==
Key West is part of the Miami-Fort Lauderdale television market. It is served by rebroadcast transmitters in Key West and Marathon that repeat the Miami-Fort Lauderdale stations. Comcast provides cable television service. DirecTV and Dish Network provide Miami-Fort Lauderdale local stations and national channels.

The Key West area has 11 FM radio stations, 4 FM translators, and 2 AM stations. WEOW 92.7 is the home of The Rude Girl & Molly Blue, a popular morning zoo duo; Bill Bravo is the afternoon host. SUN 99.5 has Hoebee and Miss Loretta in the p.m. drive. Island 106.9 FM is the only locally owned, independent FM station in Key West, featuring alternative rock music and community programs.

The Florida Keys Keynoter and the Key West Citizen are published locally and serve Key West and Monroe County. The Southernmost Flyer, a weekly publication printed in conjunction with the Citizen, is produced by the Public Affairs Department of Naval Air Station Key West and serves the local military community. Key West the Newspaper (known locally as The Blue Paper due to its colorful header) is a local weekly investigative newspaper, established in 1994 by Dennis Cooper, taken over in 2013 as a fully digital publication by Arnaud and Naja Girard.

== Education ==
Monroe County School District operates public schools in Key West.

District-operated elementary schools serving the City of Key West include Poinciana Elementary School, which is located on the island of Key West, and Gerald Adams Elementary School, which is located on Stock Island. District-operated middle and high schools include Horace O'Bryant School, a former middle school that now operates as a K–8 school, and the Key West High School. All of Key West is zoned to Horace O'Bryant School for grades 6–8 and to Key West High School for grades 9–12. Sigsbee Charter School is a K–8 school, sanctioned by the District and serving predominantly military dependent children as well as children from the community at large. Admission to Sigsbee Charter School is limited and the waiting list is managed by a lottery system. Key West Montessori Charter School is a district-sanctioned charter school on Key West Island.

The main campus of the College of the Florida Keys (formerly Florida Keys Community College) is located in Key West.

== See also ==
- Conch Republic
- Key West Butterfly and Nature Conservatory
- Key West Tropical Forest & Botanical Garden
- Neighborhoods in Key West, Florida
- Port of Key West
- The Studios of Key West
- Key West Cemetery

== Sources ==
- Caemmerer, Alex (1992). The Houses of Key West. Pineapple Press. ISBN 9781561640096.
- Viele, John (2017). Tales of Yesterday's Florida Keys. Globe Pequot. ISBN 9781561649952.
- Kerstein, Robert (2012). Key West on the Edge: Inventing the Conch Republic. University Press of Florida. ISBN 978-0-8130-4286-2.
- Albritton, Laura; Wilkinson, Jerry (2017). Key West's Duval Street. Images of America. Arcadia Publishing. ISBN 9781439663196. OCLC 1635127
- Maloney, Walter C. (1876). A Sketch of the History of Key West. Newark, New Jersey: Advertiser Printing House. LCCN 01021587.
- Browne, Jefferson Beale (1912). Key West: The Old and the New. St. Augustine, Florida: The Record Company. ISBN 9780722202197.
- Newton, Michael (April 14, 2016). A History of the Ku Klux Klan from 1866. McFarland. ISBN 9781476617190. - Total pages: 316
- Viele, John (1996). The Florida Keys: A History of the Pioneers. Sarasota, Florida: Pineapple Press. ISBN 978-1-56164-101-7.
- Gomez, Andrew (2024). Constructing Cuban America: Race and Identity in Florida's Caribbean South, 1868–1945. Austin, Texas: University of Texas Press. ISBN 978-1-4773-2977-1.
- Ogle, Maureen (2003). Key West: History of an Island of Dreams. Gainesville, Florida: University Press of Florida. ISBN 978-0-8130-2615-2. OCLC 487590196.
- Homan, Lynn M.; Reilly, Thomas (2006). Key West and the Florida Keys. Postcard History. Charleston, South Carolina: Arcadia Publishing. ISBN 978-0-7385-4296-6.
- Weddle, Robert S. (1985). Spanish Sea: The Gulf of Mexico in North American Discovery, 1500–1685. Texas A&M University Press. ISBN 978-0-89096-211-4.
- Wilkinson, Jerry. "History of Key West". keyshistory.org. Historic Florida Keys Foundation.
- Barnett, William C. (Fall 2009). "Inventing the Conch Republic: The Creation of Key West as an Escape from Modern America". Florida Historical Quarterly. 88 (2): 139–172. JSTOR 20700280.
- Boulard, Garry (October 1988). "'State of Emergency': Key West in the Great Depression". Florida Historical Quarterly. 67 (2): 166–183. JSTOR 30147949.
- Levy, Philip (Spring 2011). "'The Most Exotic of Our Cities': Race, Place, Writing, and George Allan England's Key West". Florida Historical Quarterly. 89 (4): 469–499. JSTOR 23035914.
