= Key West Historic District =

Historic district in Florida, United States

- U.S. National Register of Historic Places
- U.S. Historic district
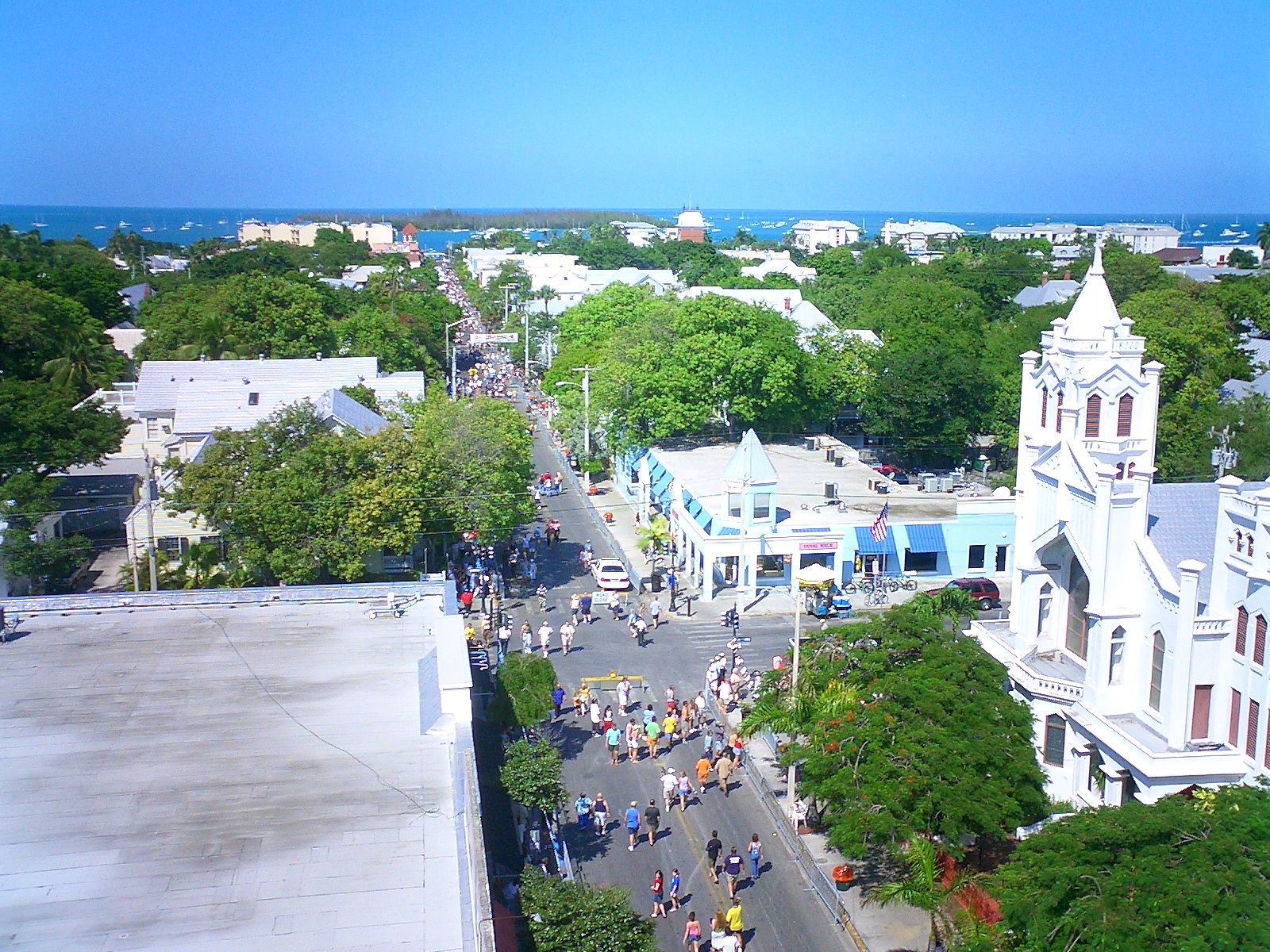
- Overview of part of the Key West Historic District from atop the La Concha

- Location within Florida Location within the United States
- Location: Key West, Florida
- Coordinates: 24.55351°N 81.79526°W
- Area: 4,000 acres (1,600 ha)
- Built: 1822
- NRHP reference No.: 71000245 (original); 83001430 (increase)

Significant dates
- Added to NRHP: March 11, 1971
- Boundary increase: February 24, 1983

The Key West Historic District (also known as Old Town of the City of Key West) is a U.S. historic district (designated as such on March 11, 1971) located in Key West, Florida. It encompasses approximately 4,000 acres (16 km^{2}), bounded by White, Angela, Windsor, Passover, Thomas and Whitehead Streets, and the Gulf of Mexico. It contains 187 historic buildings and one structure.

On February 24, 1983, the district was expanded to 5,400 acres (22 km^{2}), bounded by Emma, Whitehead, White, and South Streets, Mallory Square, and the Atlantic Ocean, to contain 2485 historic buildings and four structures.

Old Town is the name given to the historic district of the island of Key West, Florida. It is roughly the western half of the island. It is also where the central business district and majority of tourist attractions are located.

== Points of interest ==
- Key West Aquarium
- The Armory
- Oldest House Museum and Gardens
- Audubon House and Tropical Gardens
- Basilica of St. Mary Star of the Sea
- Captain Tony's Saloon
- Key West Cemetery
- U.S. Coast Guard Headquarters, Key West Station
- Ernest Hemingway House
- Key West Heritage House Museum and Robert Frost Cottage
- Key West Lighthouse
- Mallory Square
- Mel Fisher Maritime Heritage Museum
- Birthplace of Pan-Am
- Dr. Joseph Y. Porter House
- Fogarty Mansion
- Key West Museum of Art and History
- Old Town Manor
- Key West Shipwreck Museum
- Sloppy Joe's
- Richard Peacon House
- Southernmost House
- Thompson Fish House, Turtle Cannery and Kraals
- Harry S. Truman Little White House
- Western Union (schooner)

== Gallery ==
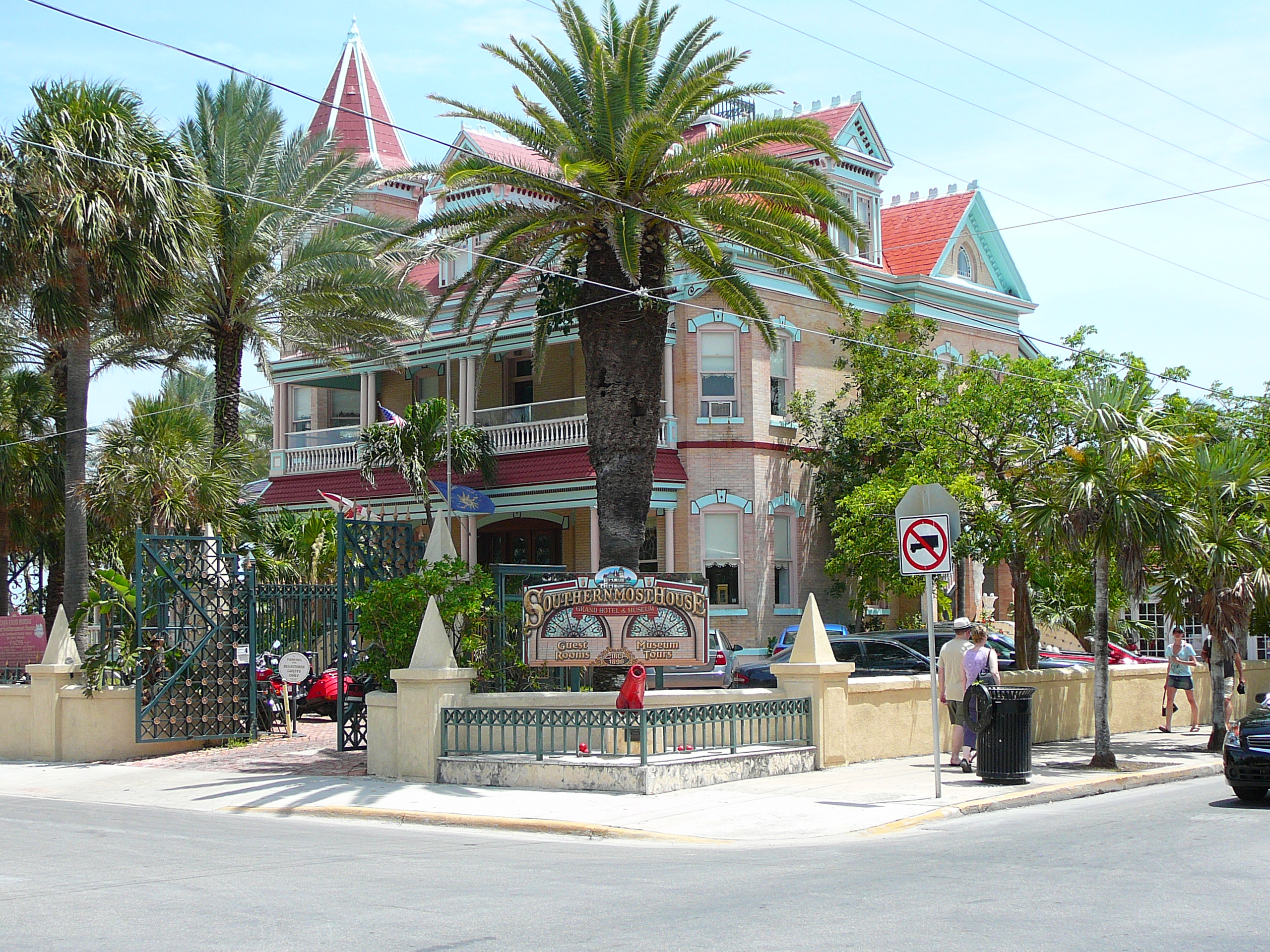
Southernmost House, a Victorian-style mansion in Old Town Key West.

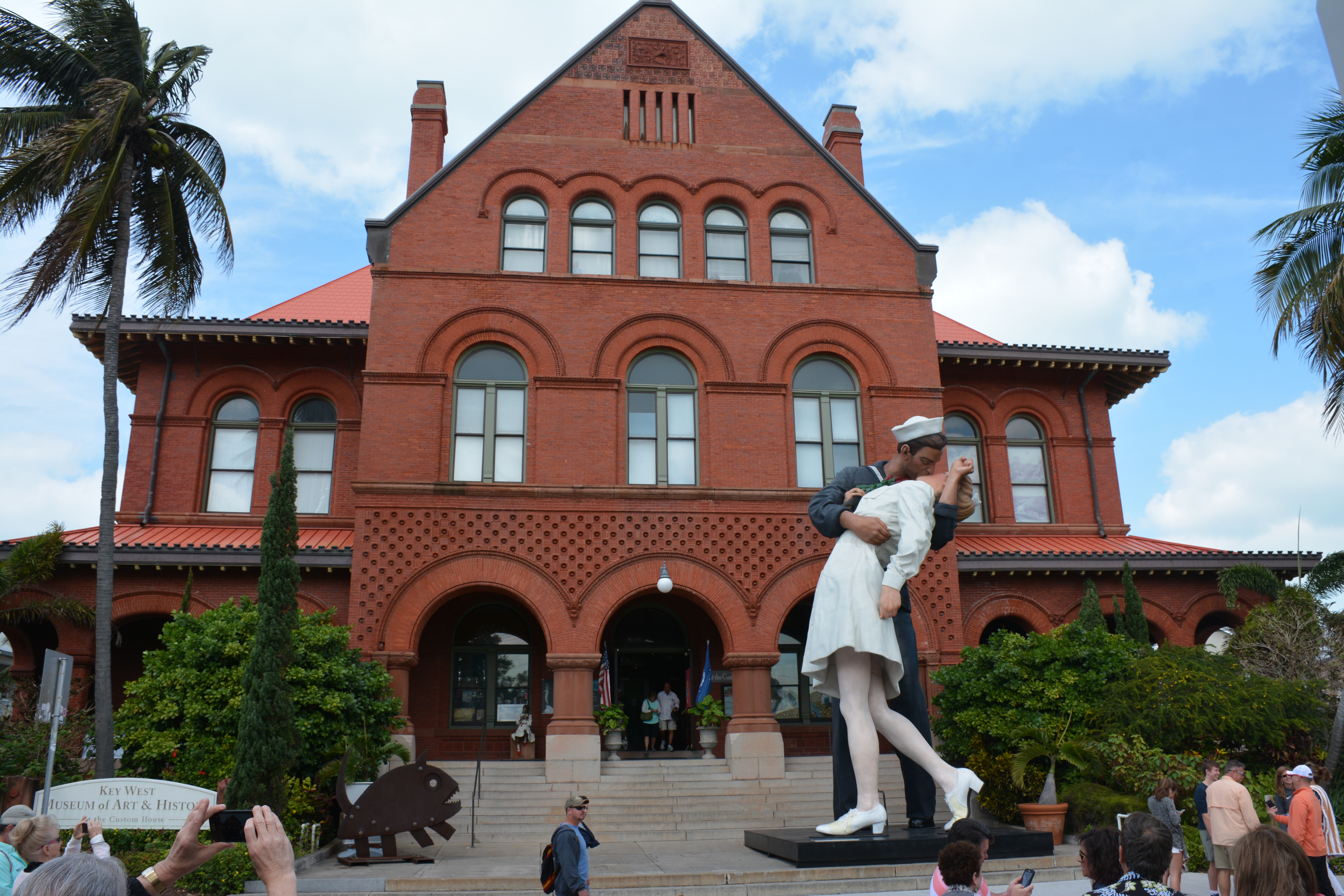
Former Key West Customshouse, now the Museum of Art & History in Old Town Key West.

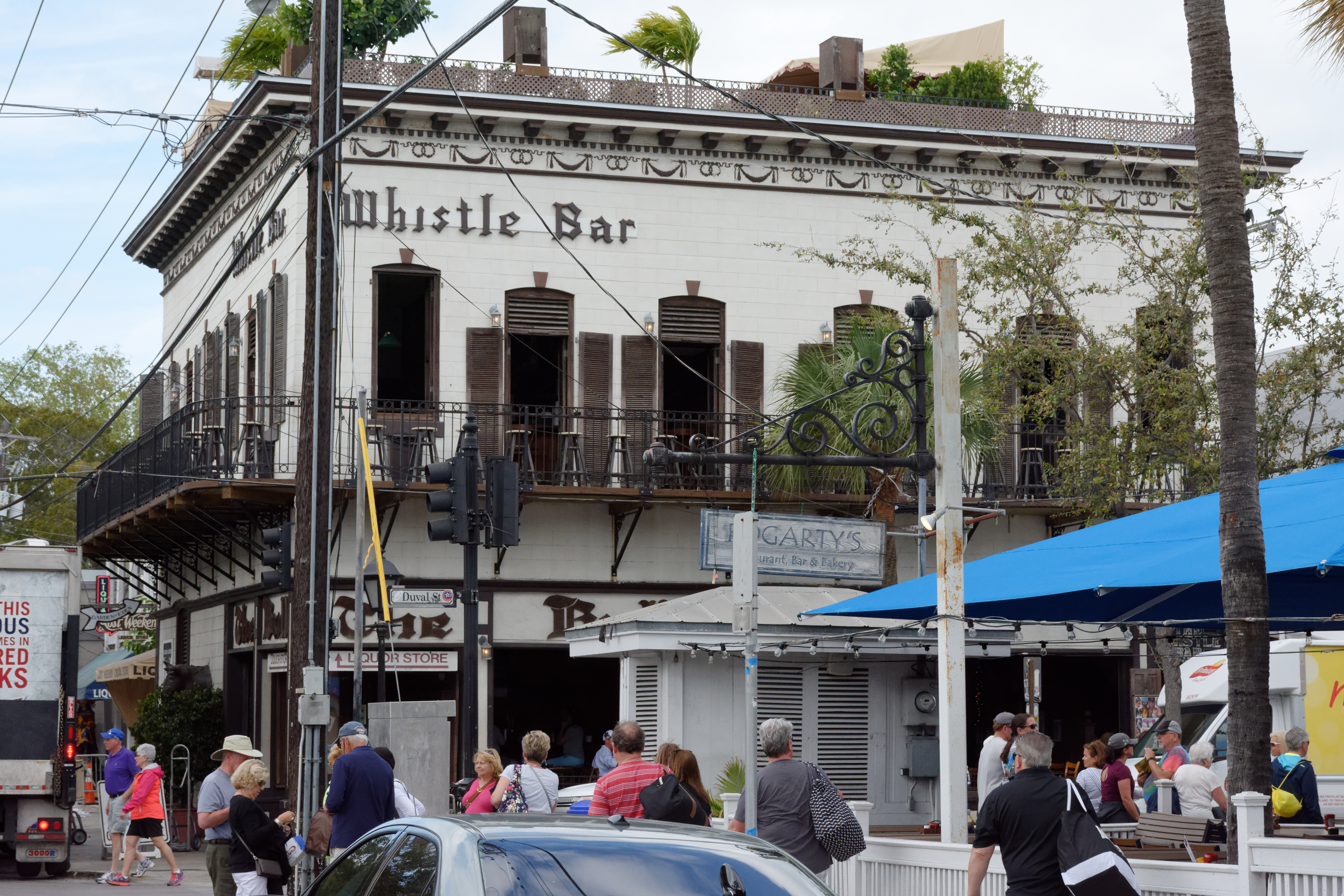
The Bull & Whistle bars, in Old Town Key West.

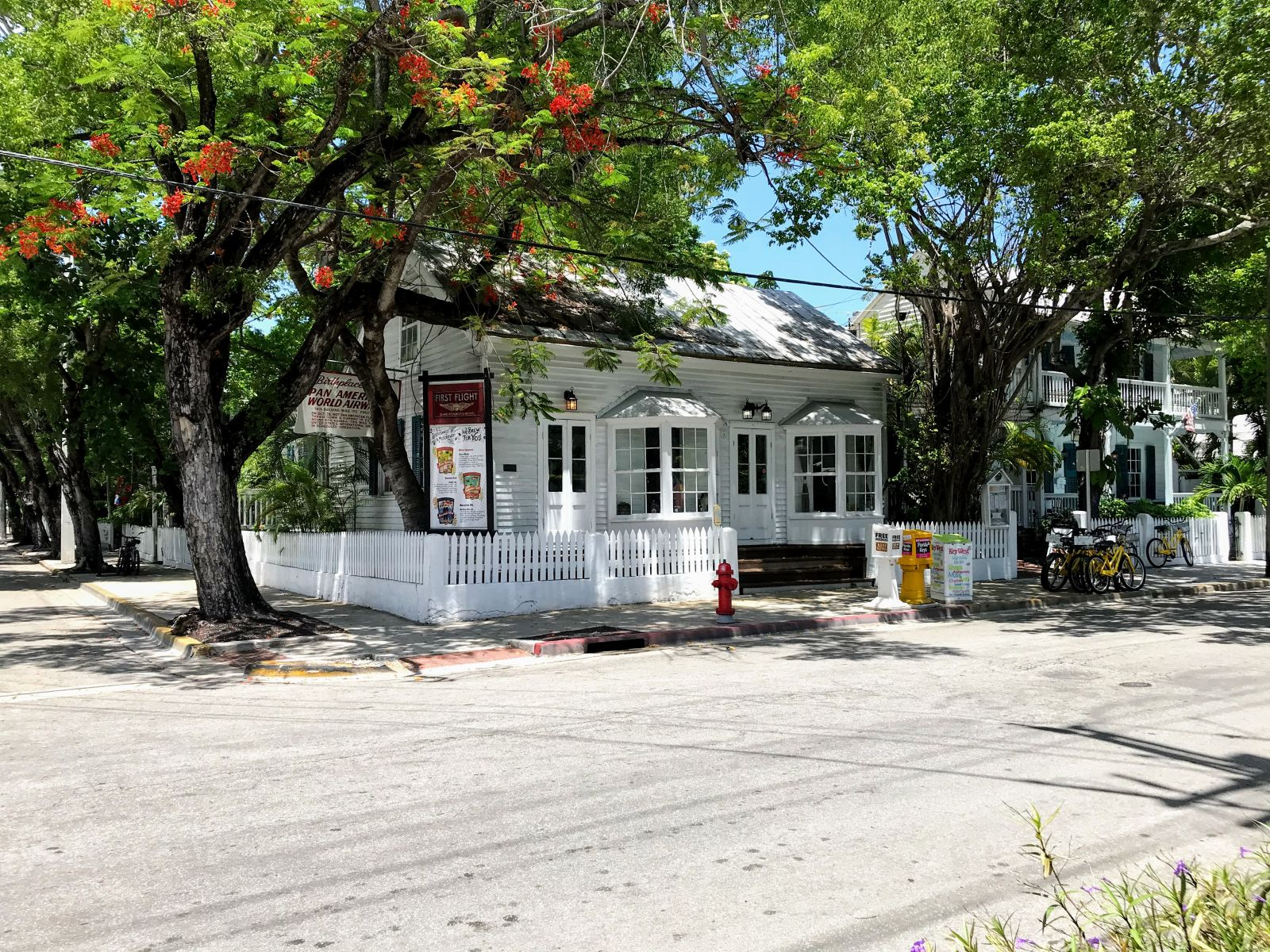
Birthplace of Pan American Airlines in June 2020

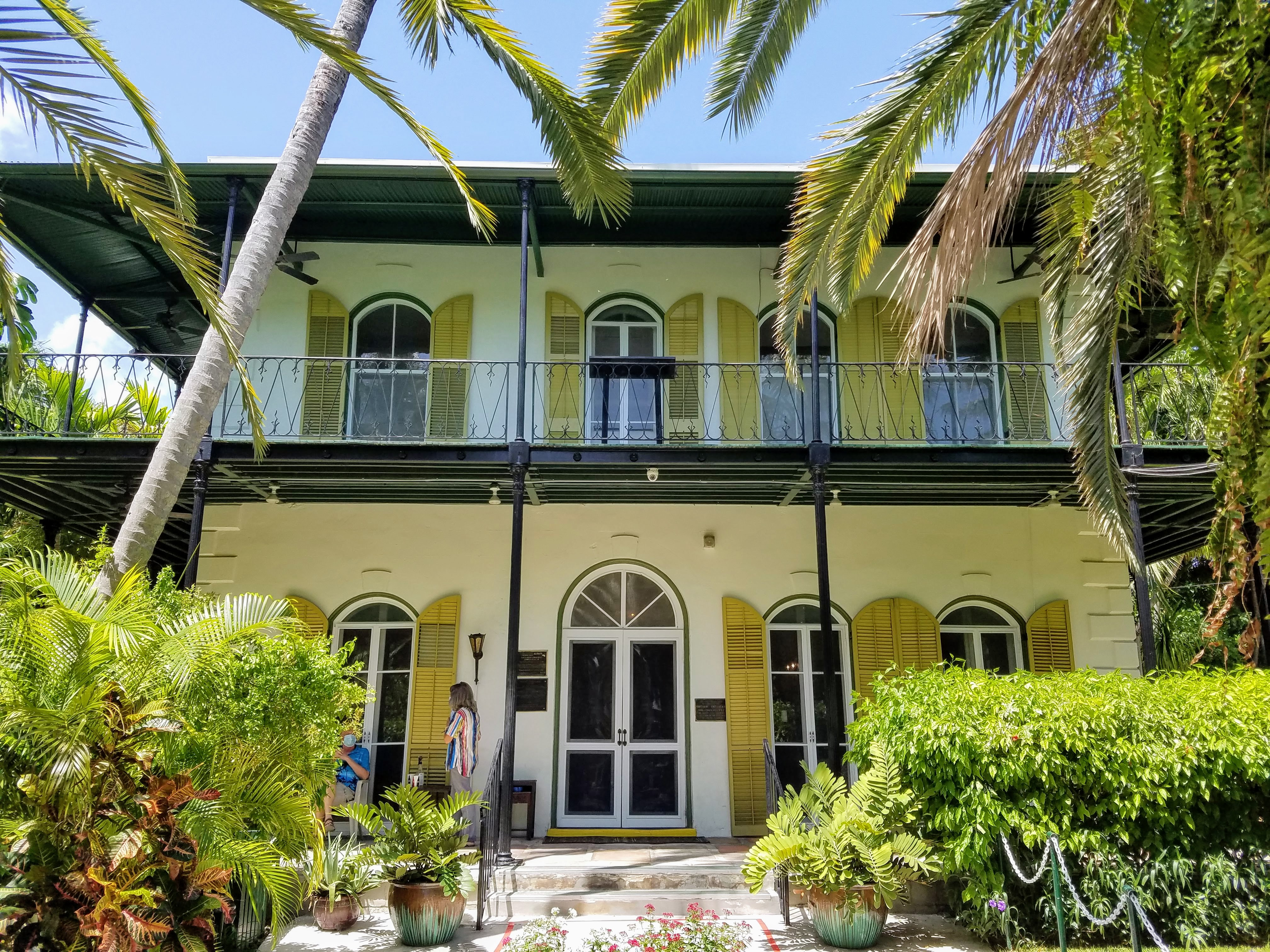
Ernest Hemingway Home in June 2020

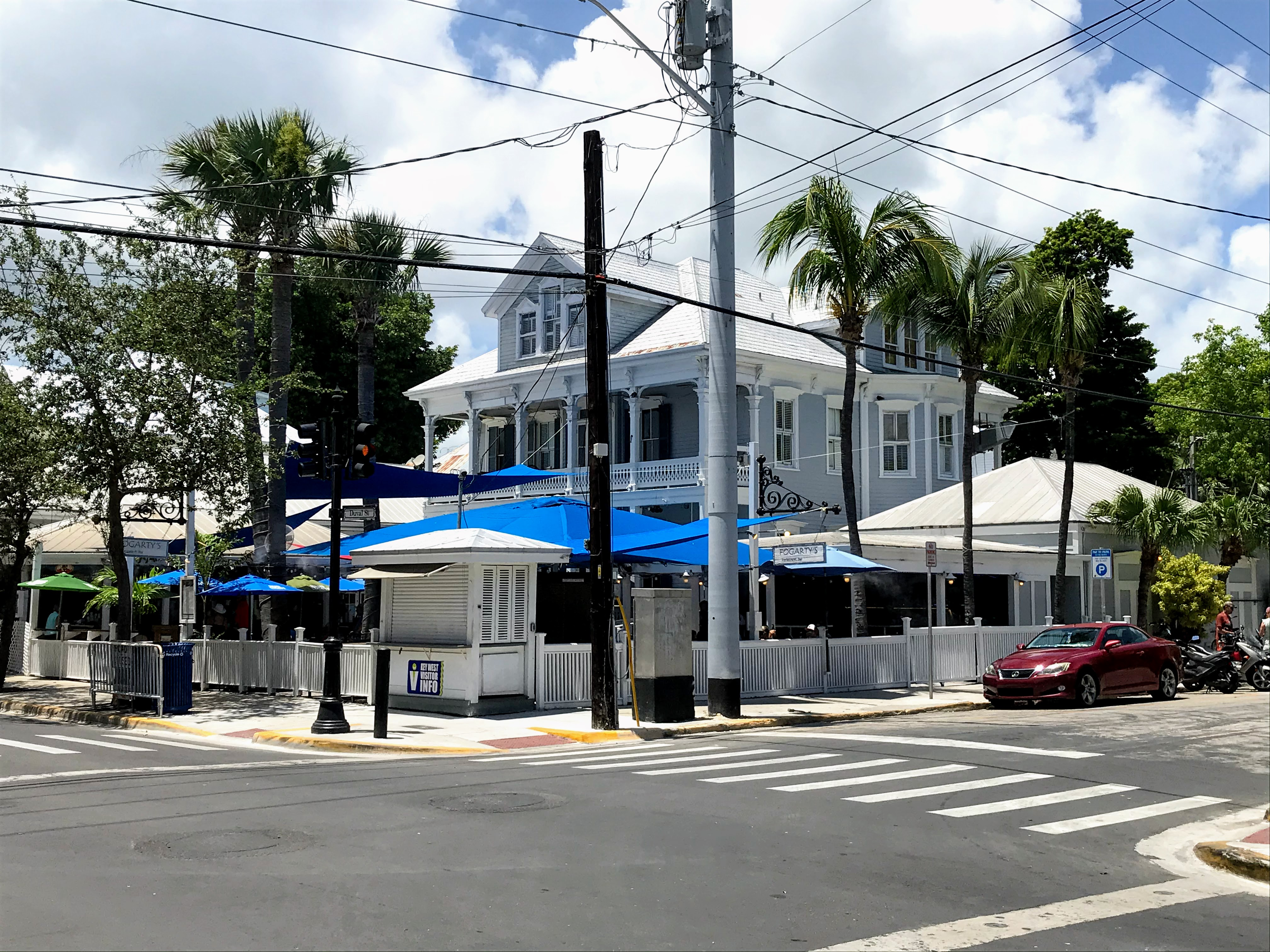
Fogartys Mansion in June 2020

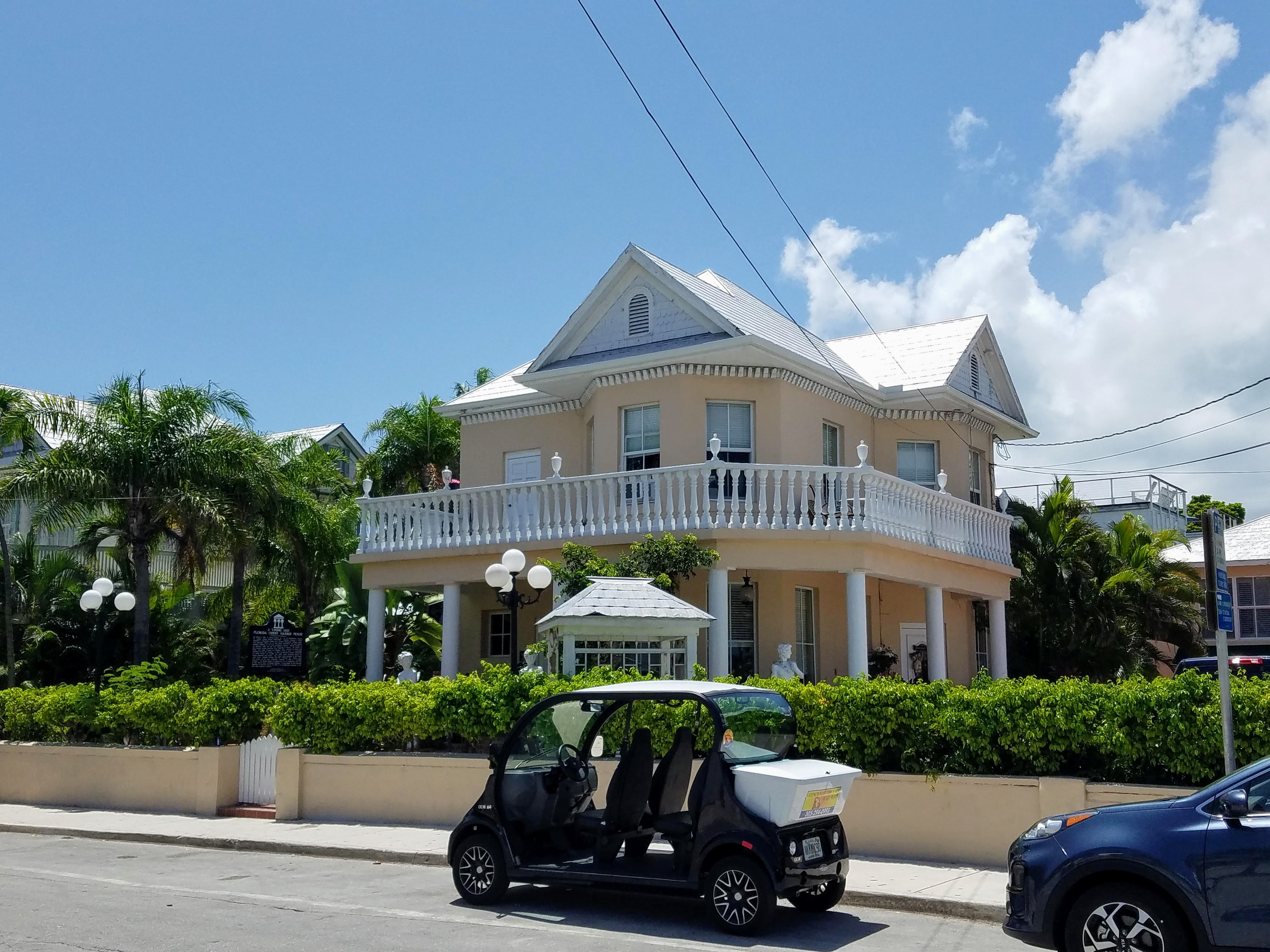
J. Vining and Florida Curry Harris House in June 2020

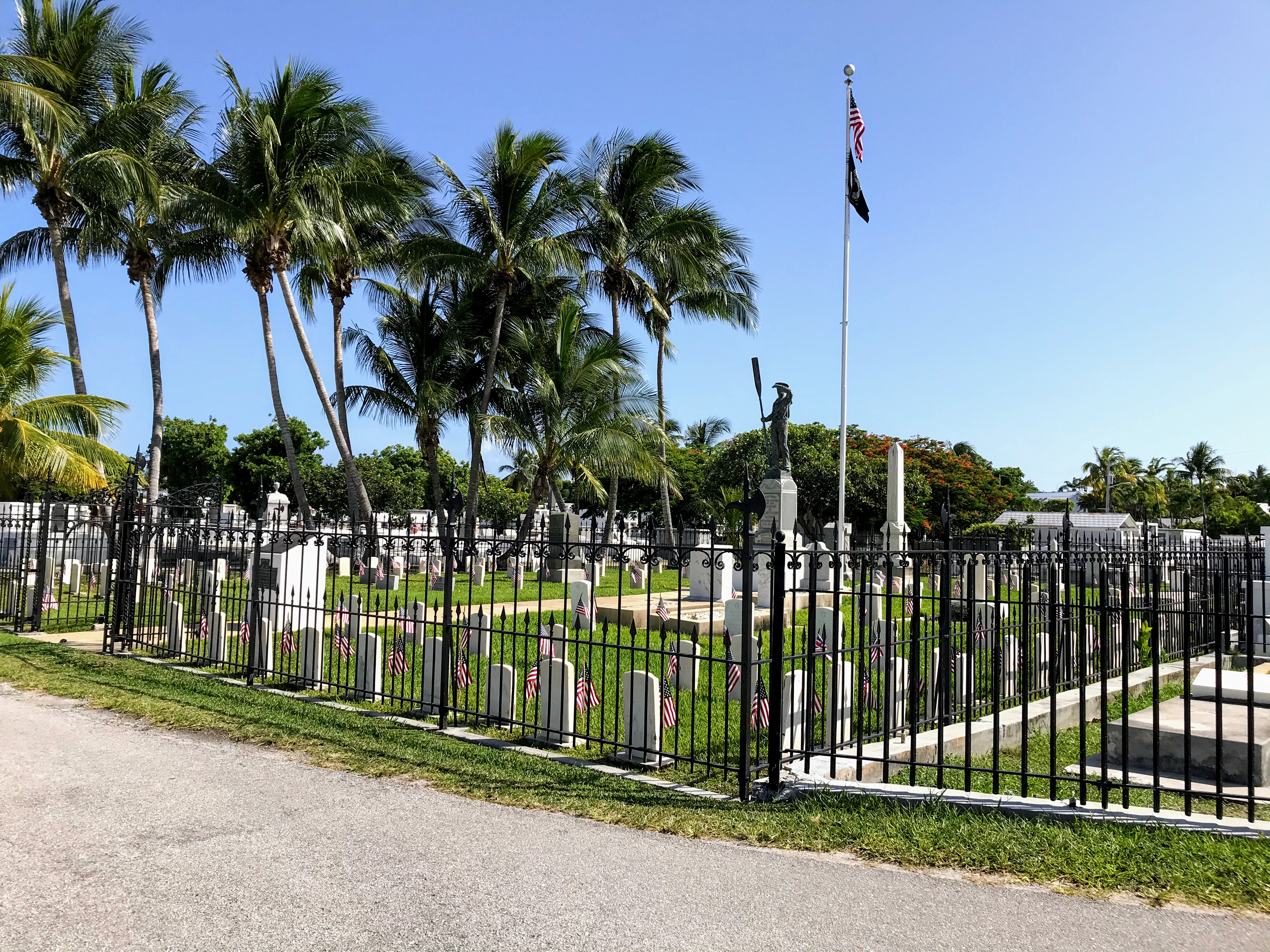
USS Maine Memorial & Graves - June 2020

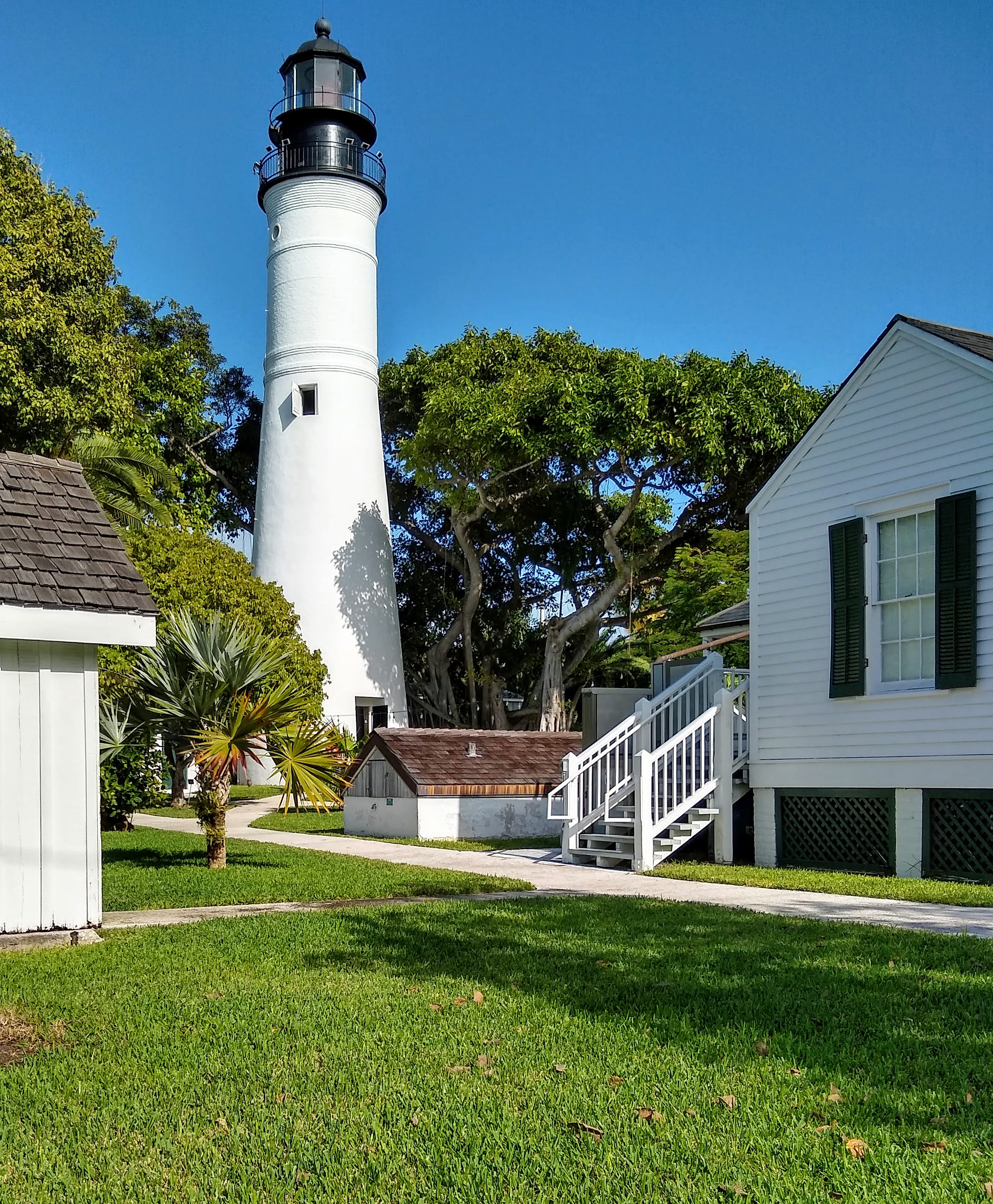
Key West Lighthouse - January 2020

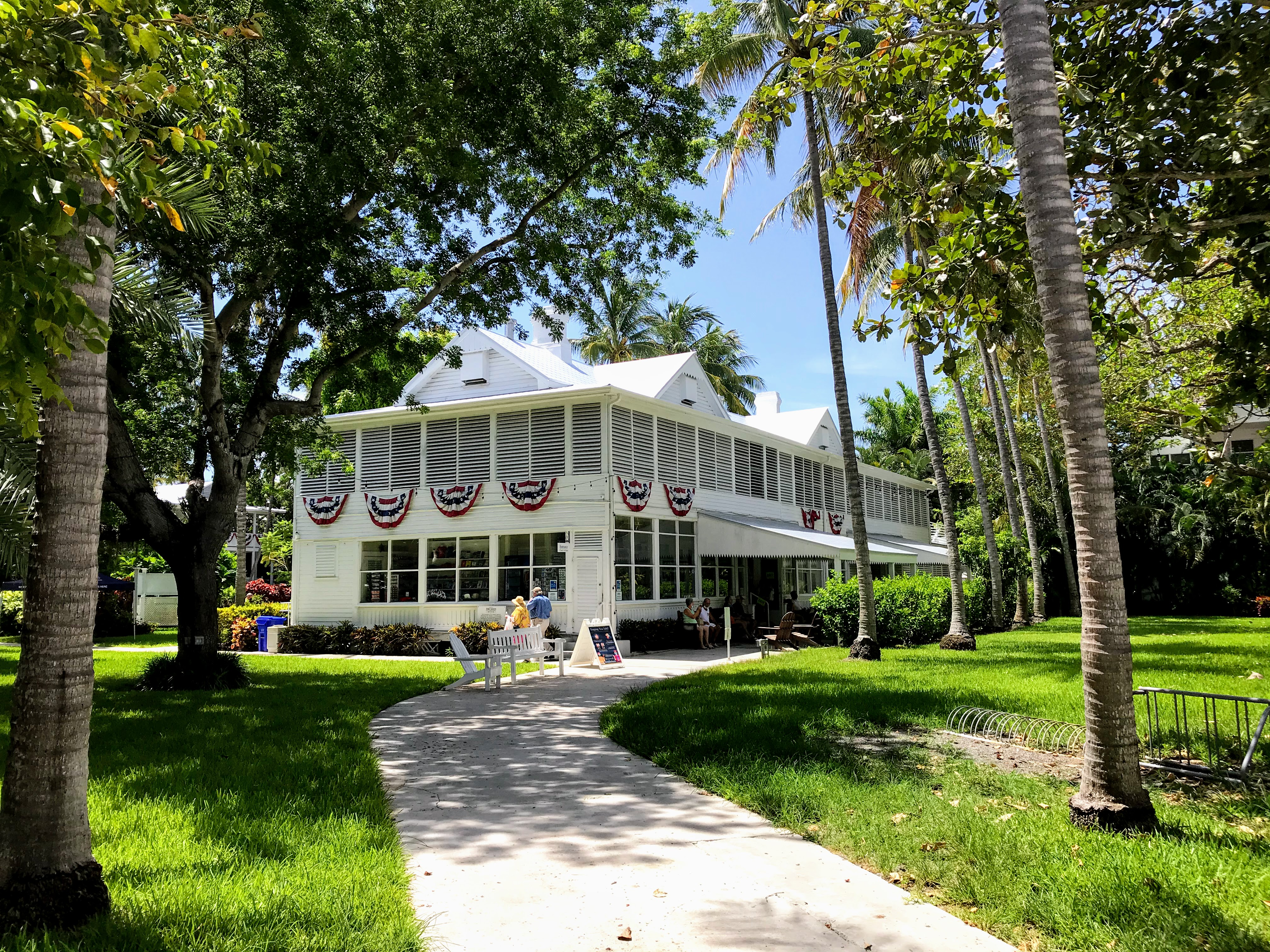
Little White House - June 2020

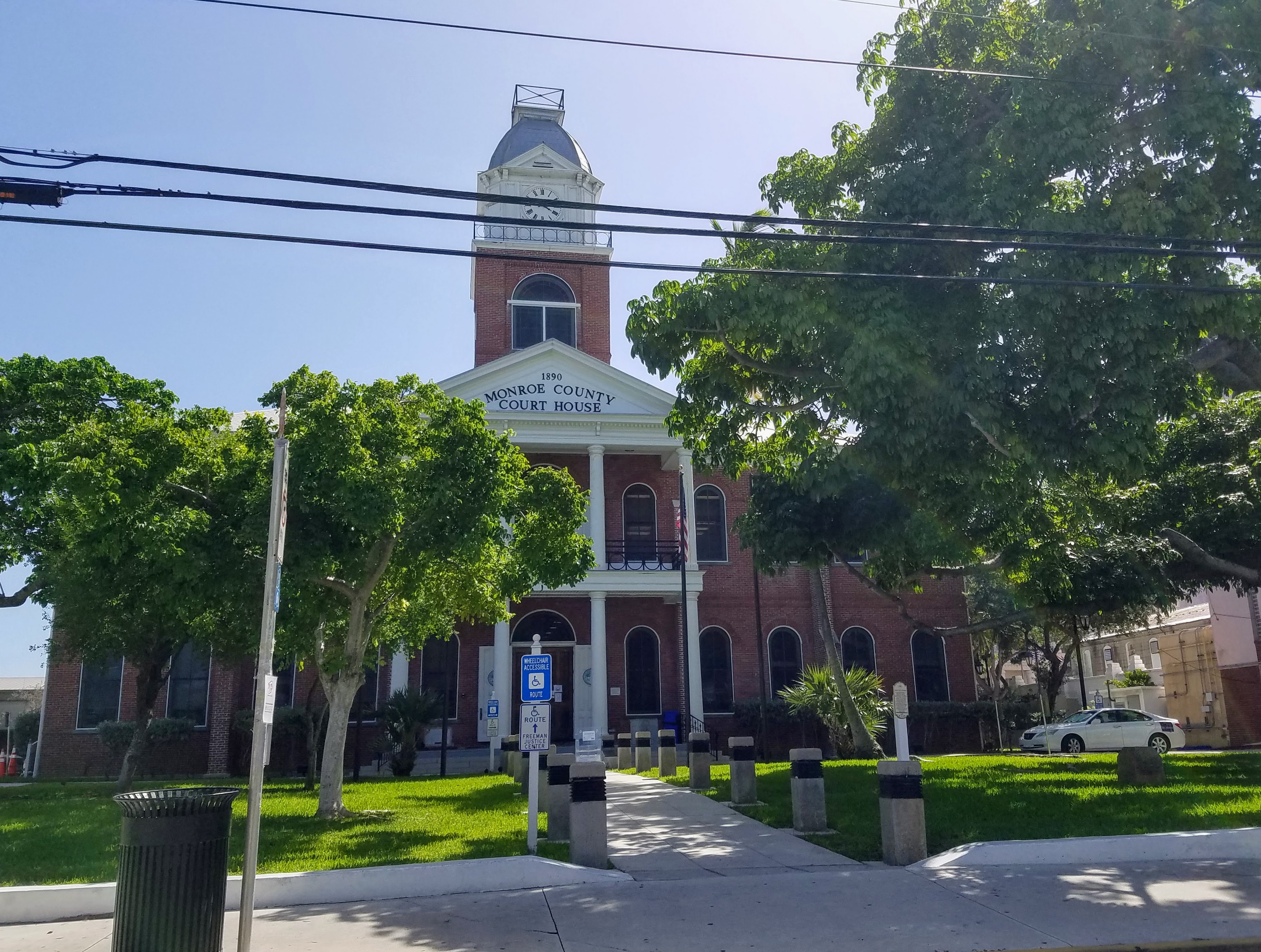
Monroe County Courthouse - June 2020

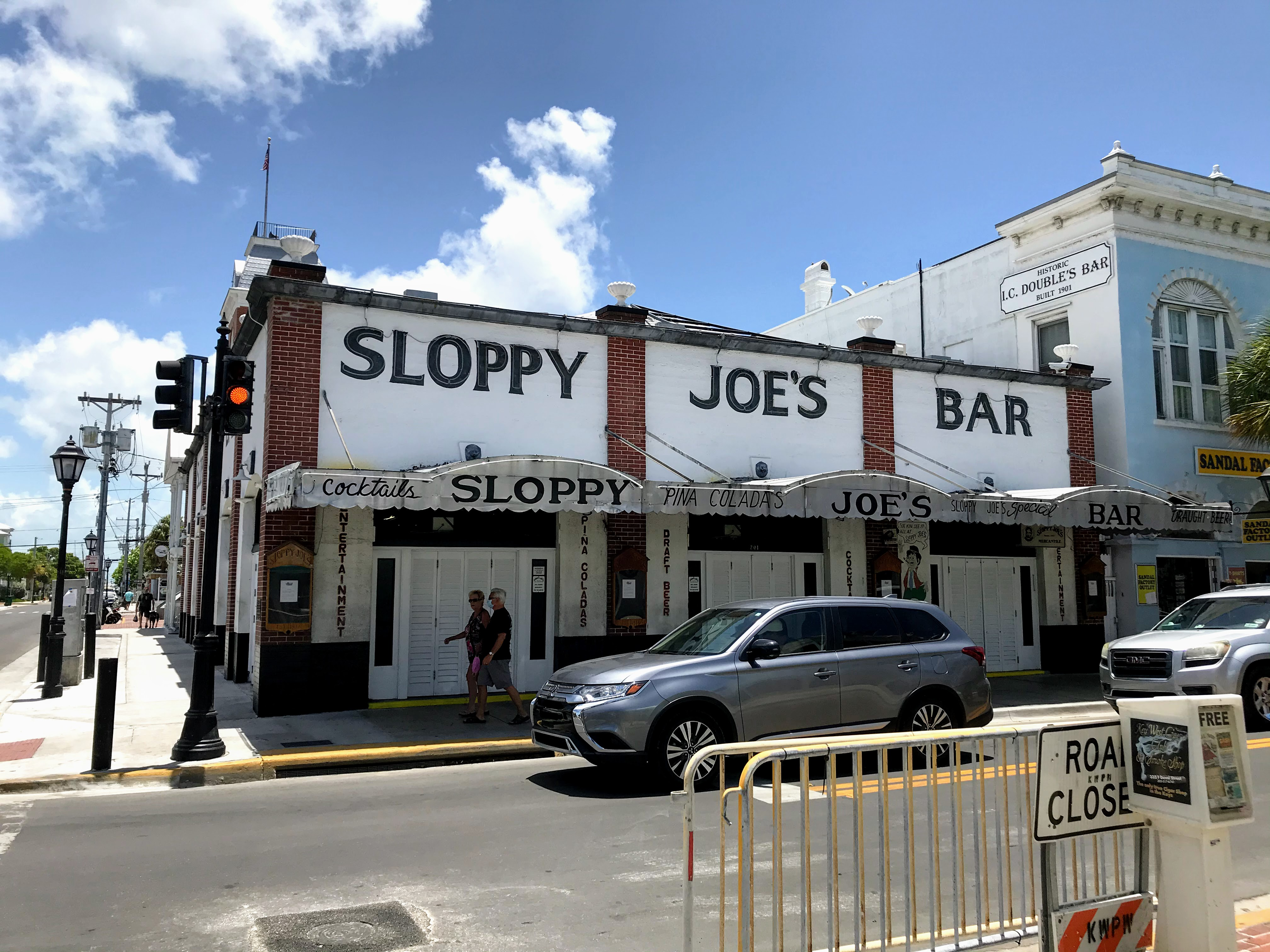
Sloppy Joe's Bar - June 2022
