= U.S. Naval Station (Key West, Florida) =

- US Naval Station
- U.S. National Register of Historic Places
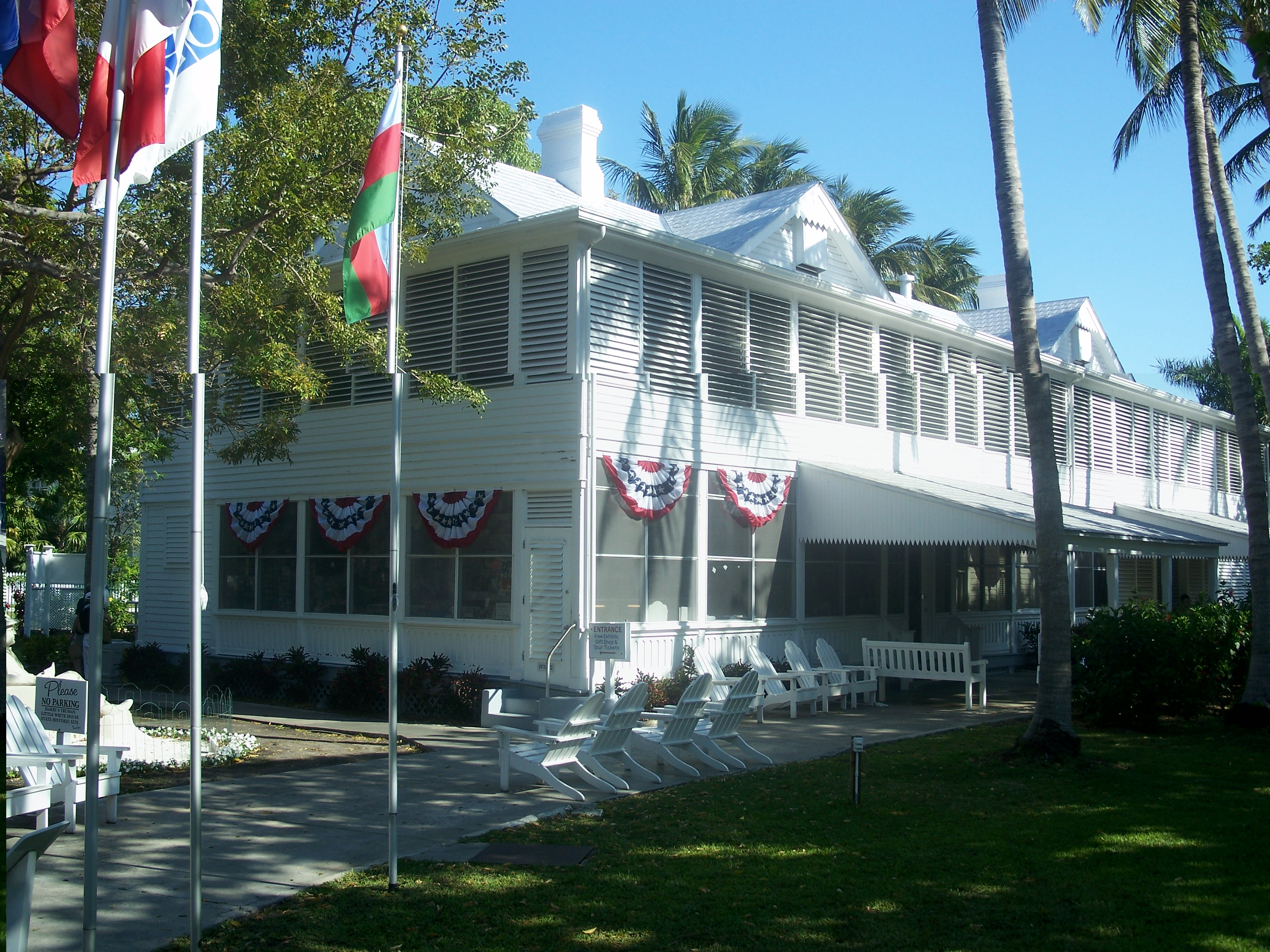
- Little White House, part of the U.S Naval Station

- Location within Florida Location within the United States
- Location: Roughly bounded by Whitehead, Eaton, and Caroline Sts., Key West, Florida
- Coordinates: 24°32′51″N 81°48′37″W
- Area: 12 acres (4.9 ha)
- Built: 1845
- Architectural style: Classical Revival
- NRHP reference No.: 84000915
- Added to NRHP: May 8, 1984

The U.S. Naval Station in Key West, Florida, United States is a historic district that was listed on the National Register of Historic Places in 1984.

It is a 12-acre (4.9 ha) district roughly bounded by Whitehead, Eaton, and Caroline Streets. It included 23 structures built during 1845–1923, one built in 1942, four fresh water cisterns and four elevated storage tanks.

The Naval Station included an area known as the Truman Annex, an area including officer's quarters and the "Little White House" where President Harry S Truman occasionally vacationed.

== Gallery ==
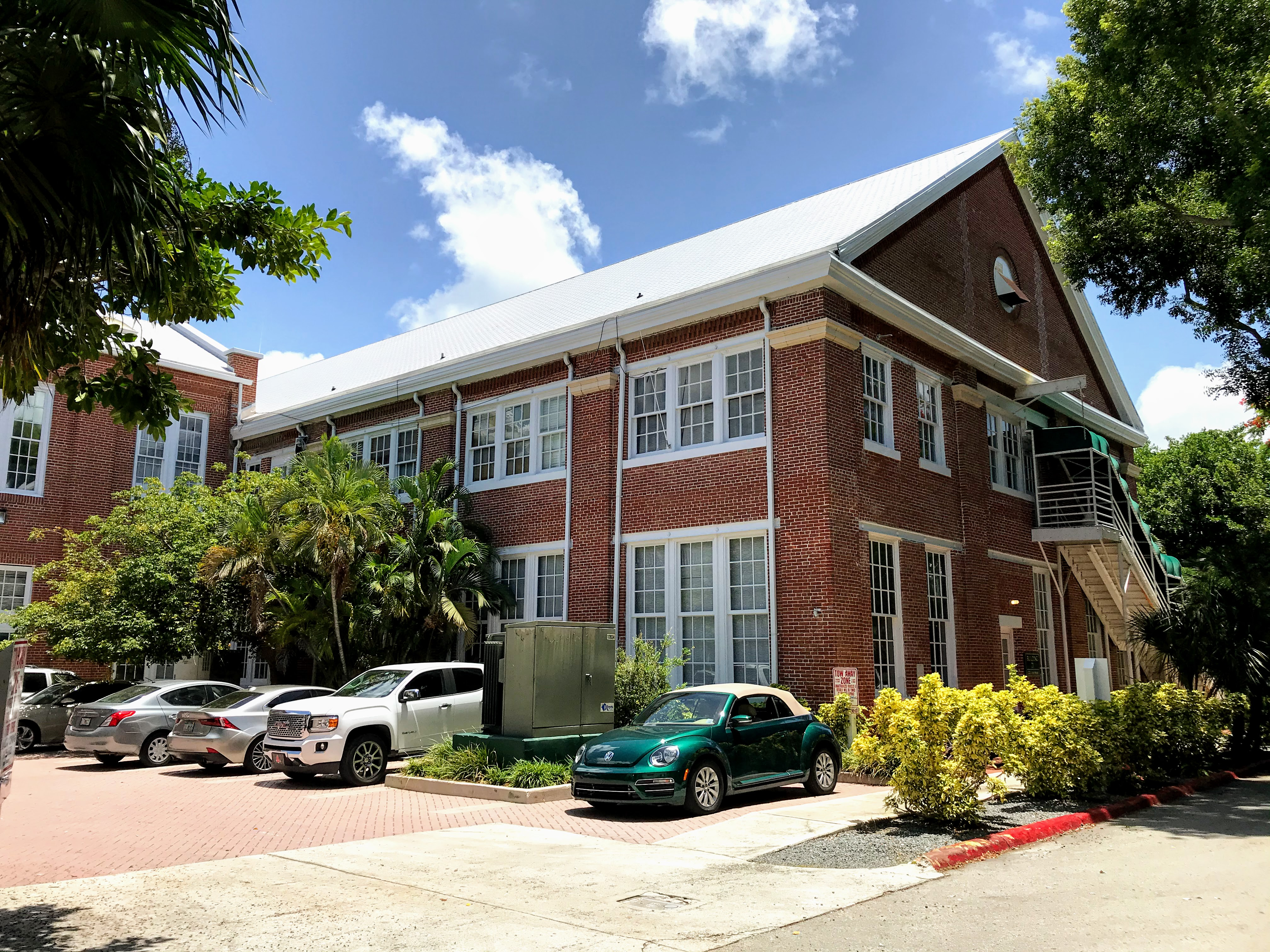
Building 21 - June 2020

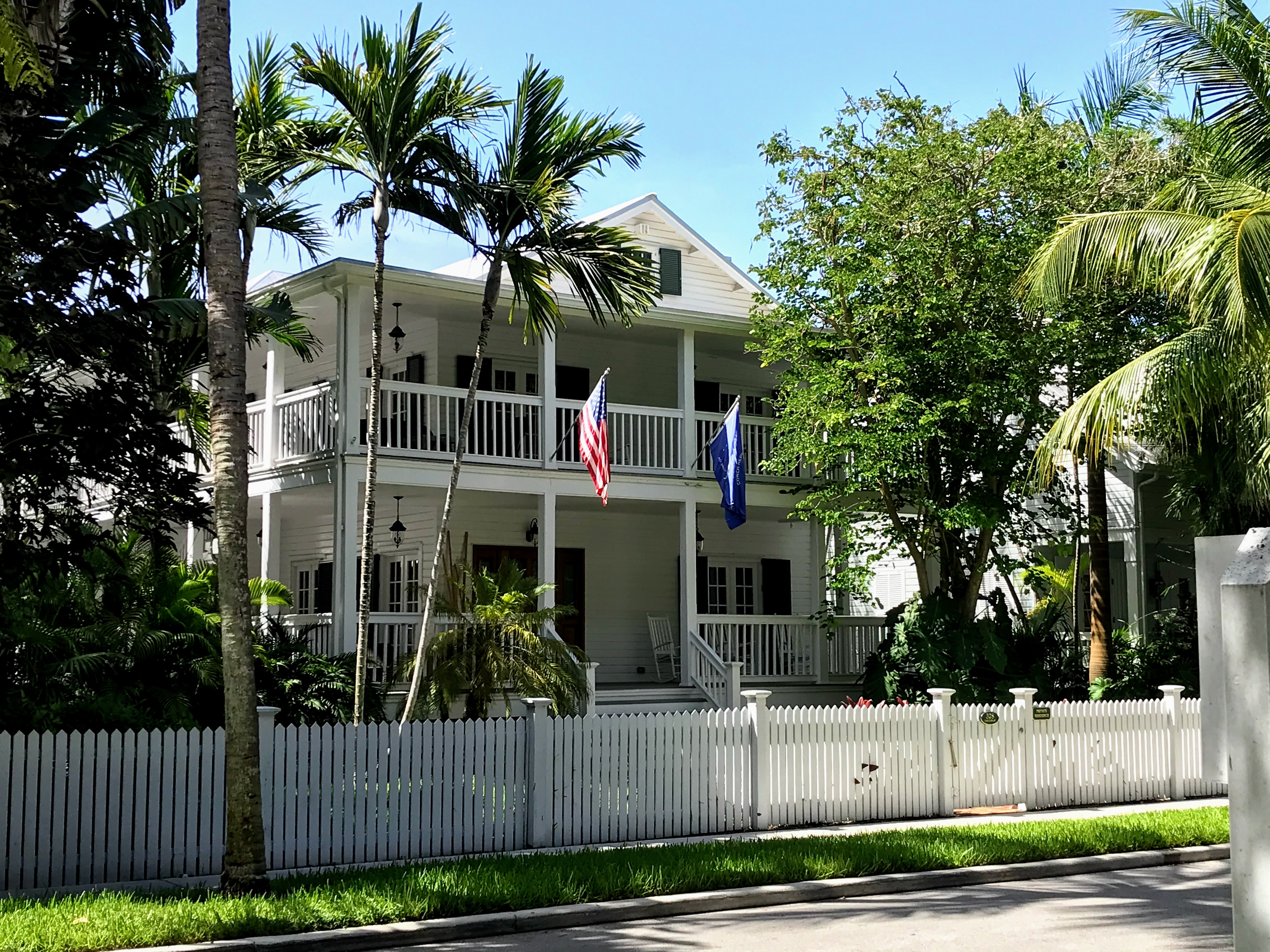
Caroline Street Residence - June 2020
