= Key West Heritage House Museum and Robert Frost Cottage =

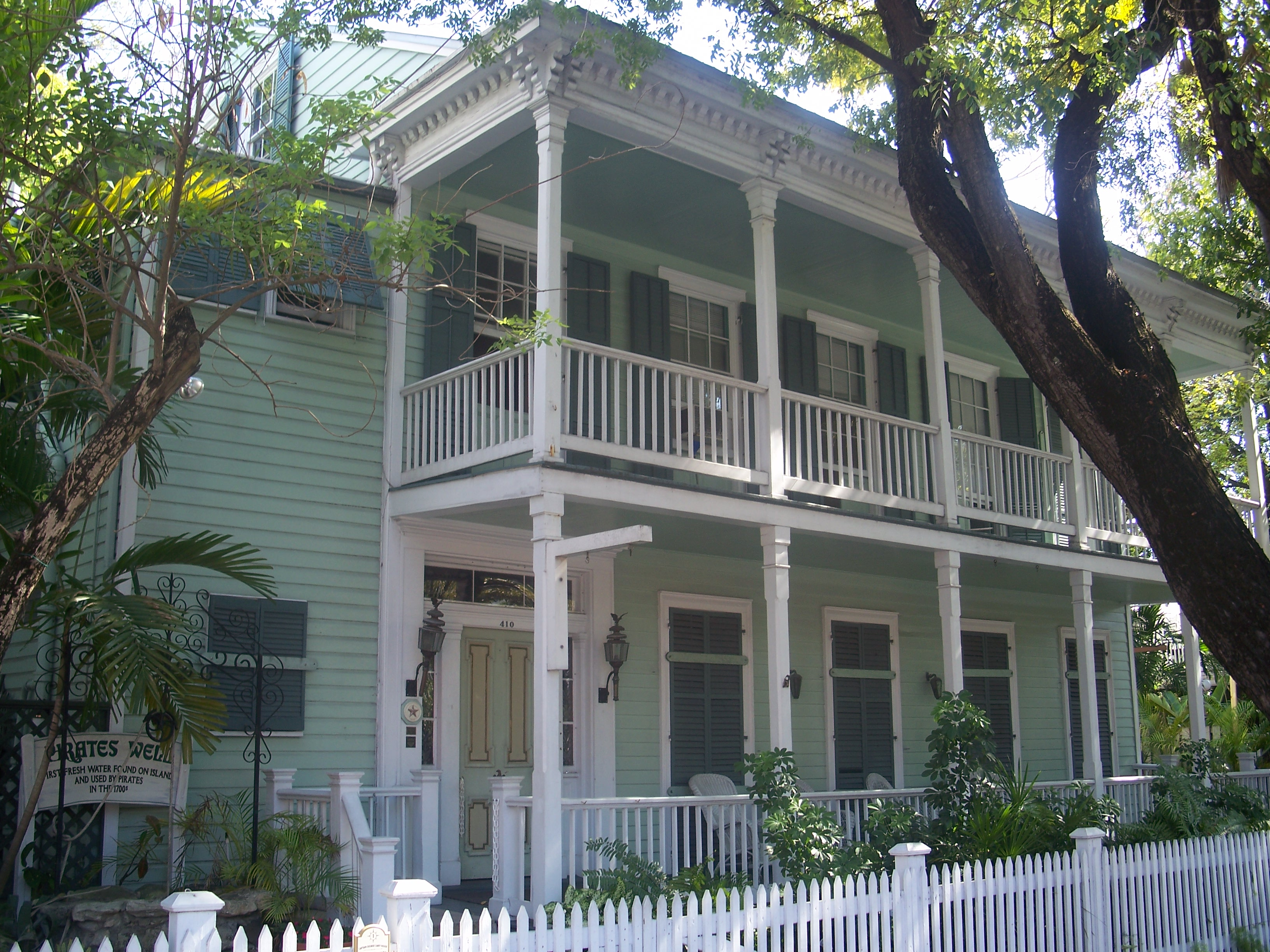

- Location within Florida
- Location: 410 Caroline Street; Key West, Florida
- Coordinates: 24.557502°N 81.805127°W
- Type: Heritage, History
- Website: Key West Heritage House Museum and Robert Frost Cottage

The Key West Heritage House Museum and Robert Frost Cottage, also known as the Jessie Porter's Heritage House Museum and Robert Frost Cottage, was a museum located at 410 Caroline Street, Key West, Florida. The Key West Heritage House, purchased by Jessie Porter in 1934 and opened as a museum in 1995, closed on April 17, 2010.

Once the home of Key West hostess and preservationist Jessie Porter, the Heritage House contains hundreds of mementos from Key West's early days, when shipwreck salvaging made it the richest city per capita in the United States. Visitors learn about the property's role as a gathering place for writers including Thornton Wilder, Tennessee Williams, Elizabeth Bishop and Robert Frost.

Starting in 1945, poet Robert Frost spent 16 consecutive winters in the cottage behind the house, which now bears his name.
