= Basilica of St. Mary Star of the Sea (Key West, Florida) =

Historic church in Florida, United States

- St. Mary Star of the Sea
- U.S. Historic district – Contributing property
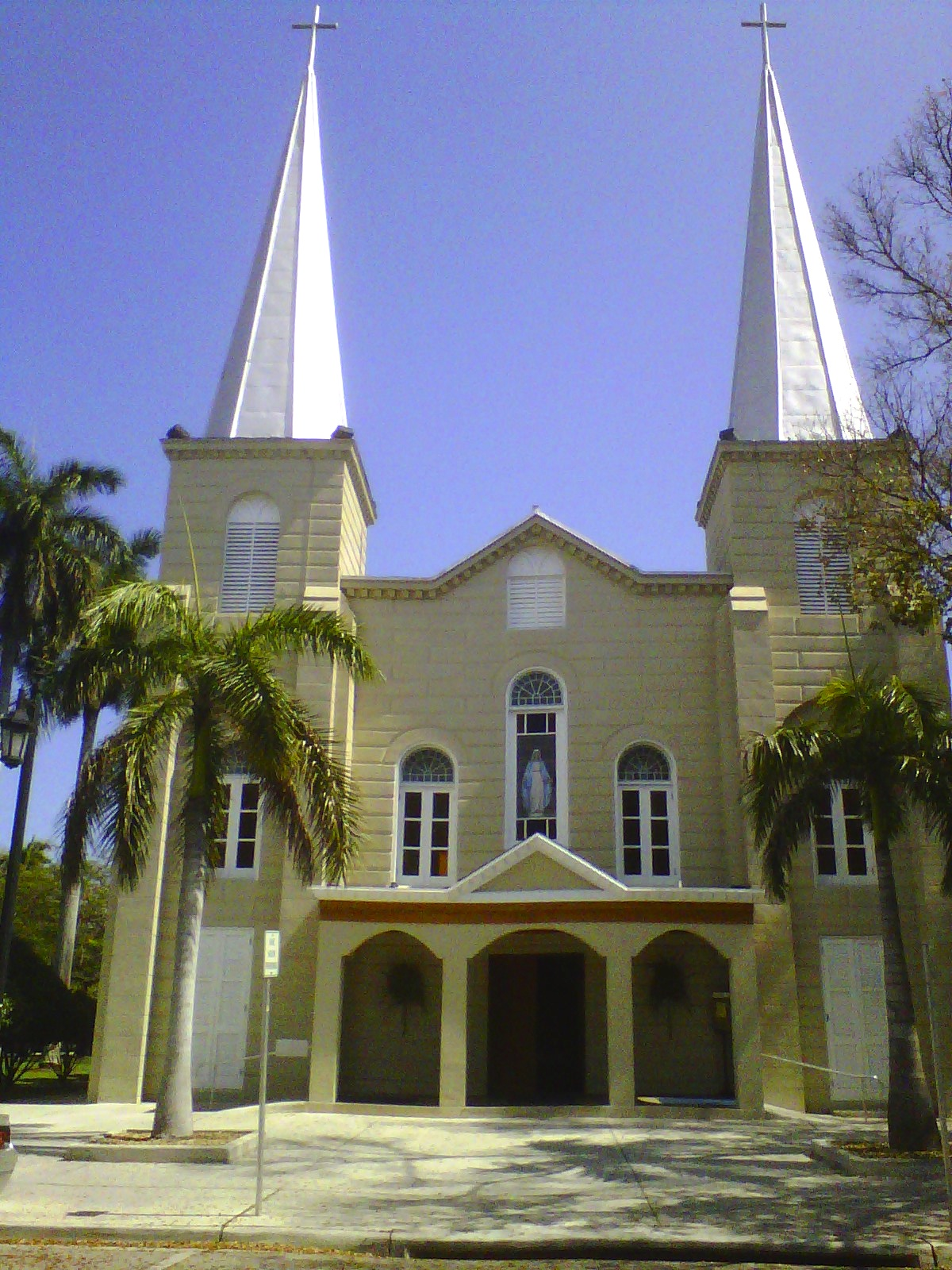

- Location within Florida Location within the United States
- Location: 1010 Windsor Lane; Key West, Florida
- Coordinates: 24°33′11.16″N 81°47′43.67″W
- Built: 1905
- Architectural style: Victorian
- Part of: Key West Historic District (ID71000245)
- Added to NRHP: March 11, 1971

The Basilica of St. Mary Star of the Sea is a Minor Basilica of the Catholic Church located in Key West, Florida, United States. It is one of the oldest Catholic parishes in the state of Florida and the oldest parish in the Archdiocese of Miami. The church is a contributing property in the Key West Historic District on the National Register of Historic Places.

== History ==
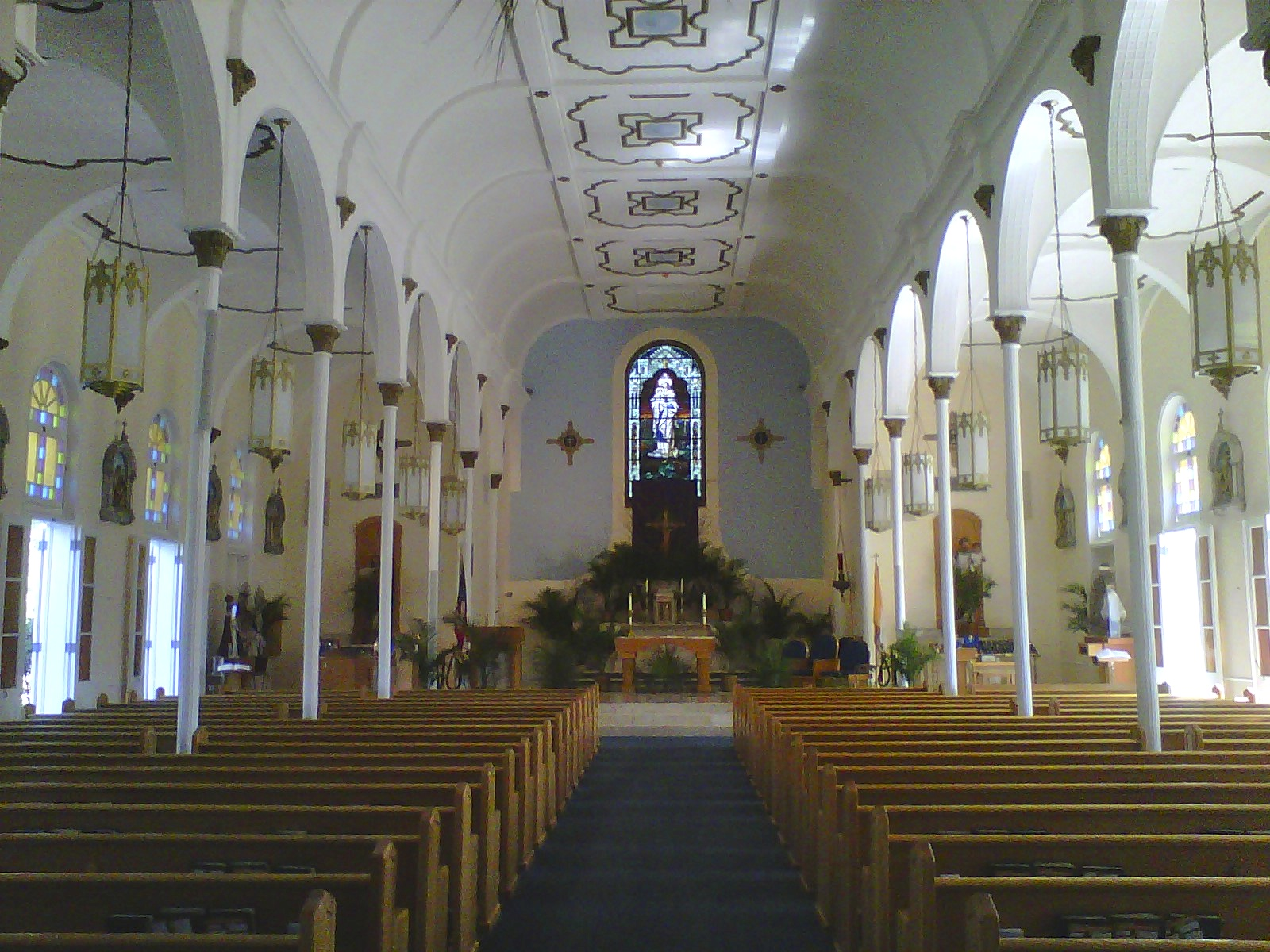
The basilica's interior

The first Catholic presence in the Florida Keys was established on Upper Matecumbe Key by Spanish Jesuits in 1566. The Jesuit superiors in Spain abandoned the Florida missions in 1572 and the missionaries were recalled to Mexico. They attempted to establish a permanent mission on Key West as early as 1724. However, the Native peoples on the Keys were unpredictable and the English raiders from the Carolinas forced the missionaries to return to Cuba in 1727. Two Italian Jesuits from Havana opened a mission chapel on Key West in 1743 for the Native peoples. The Spanish governor ordered them to return to Cuba as well as he could not protect them.

The Rev. John F. Kirby was sent by Bishop Francis X. Gartland of the Diocese of Savannah to Key West in 1851 and established St. Mary Star of the Sea parish in 1851. The first permanent Catholic Church on Key West was dedicated on February 26, 1852, on the corner of Duval and Eaton Streets. It was the fifth Catholic parish established in the state of Florida and the first parish in South Florida. Because of its location between the Gulf of Mexico and the Atlantic Ocean it was placed under the patronage of Our Lady, Star of the Sea. Rev. Anthony B. Friend, S.J. arrived in Key West as pastor on February 15, 1898. He was the first many American Jesuits to serve the parish.

The original church building was destroyed in a fire in 1901. Until a new church could be built, Mass was celebrated in the convent music hall. The present structure was built in 1905. The Jesuits ended their service to the parish after seventy-two years in 1970 and the Rev. Charles Zinn of the Archdiocese of Miami became pastor. St. Mary Star of the Sea Church was added to the National Register of Historic Places in 1971 as a contributing property in the Key West Historic District. The church was raised to a minor basilica by Pope Benedict XVI on February 11, 2012.

Sunday masses are celebrated in English, Spanish and Haitian Creole.

== Architecture ==
The exterior of the church reflects the eclectic period of American Victorian Architecture. It also shows elements of a modified, early Renaissance Revival style. This may be found in the rusticated walls, rounded arches and lunettes that are composed of transitional gothic arches, louvered shutters and colored glass. Many interior elements have both Romanesque and early Renaissance characteristics. Behind the altar is a stained glass window that depicts the church's patroness.

== Education ==
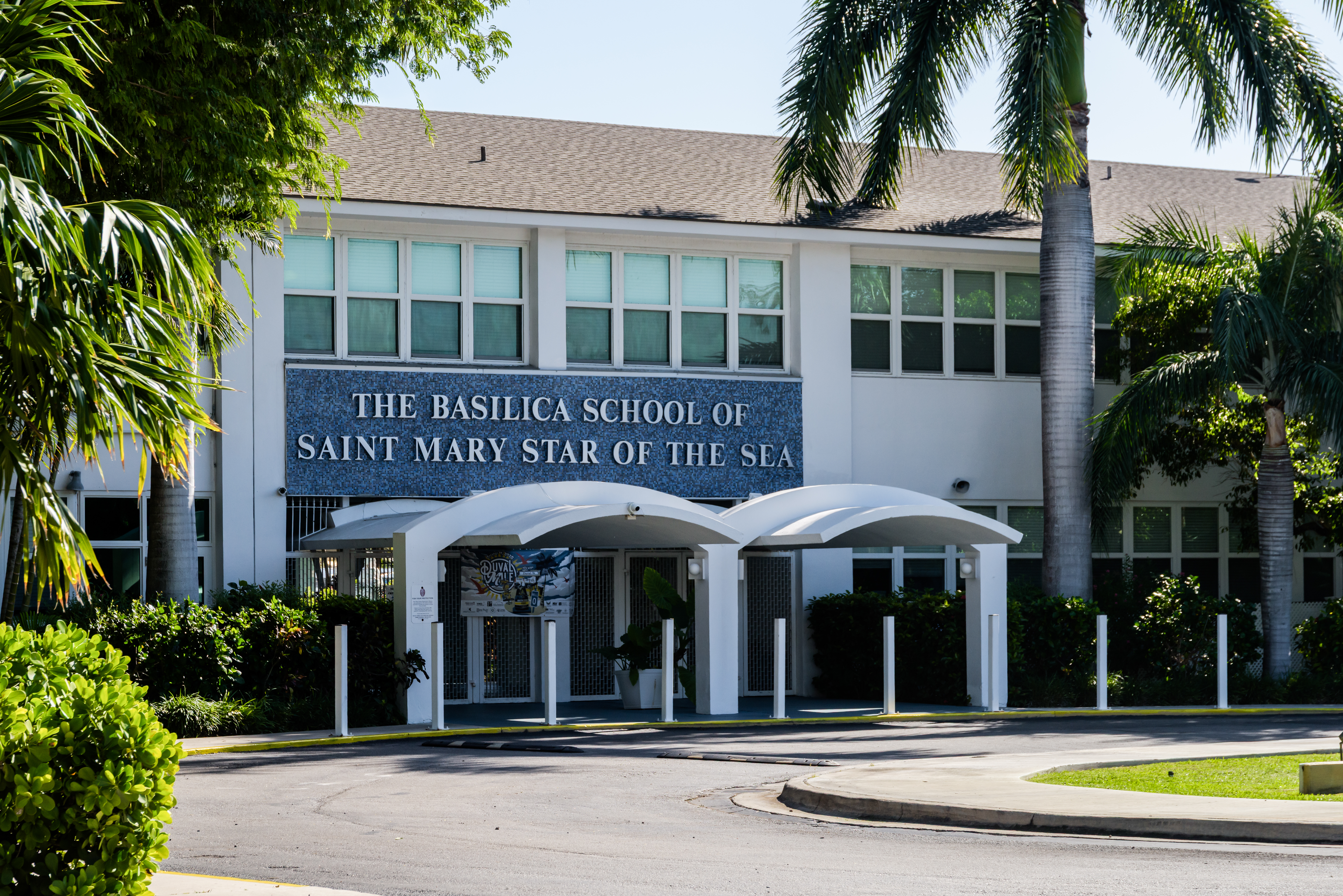
The Basilica School of Saint Mary Star of the Sea in 2025

Five Sisters of the Holy Names of Jesus and Mary from Montreal, Quebec, Canada arrived in 1868 to open a school for girls and to establish a convent. It was the first Catholic School in the state of Florida. The sisters bought the present school property in 1874. The Convent of Mary Immaculate, later known as Mary Immaculate High School, operated from 1886 to 1986, St. Francis Xavier School for blacks operated from 1872 to 1961, a school for Cuban girls operated from 1873 to 1878 and St. Joseph School for boys operated from 1880 to 1961.

The Basilica School of St. Mary Star of the Sea is the present parish school. It was established in 1959 on the site of the former St. Joseph's School, for white male children, and St. Francis Xavier's School, for black children. All the schools were integrated in the 1960s.

In 1983 the Sisters of the Holy Names of Jesus and Mary ended their service in Key West after 115 years.

== Trivia ==
The church appeared in the 1989 James Bond film Licence to Kill.

== See also ==
- Star of the Sea Church (disambiguation)
