= Harry S. Truman Little White House =

Historic place in Florida, U.S.

- Little White House
- U.S. National Register of Historic Places
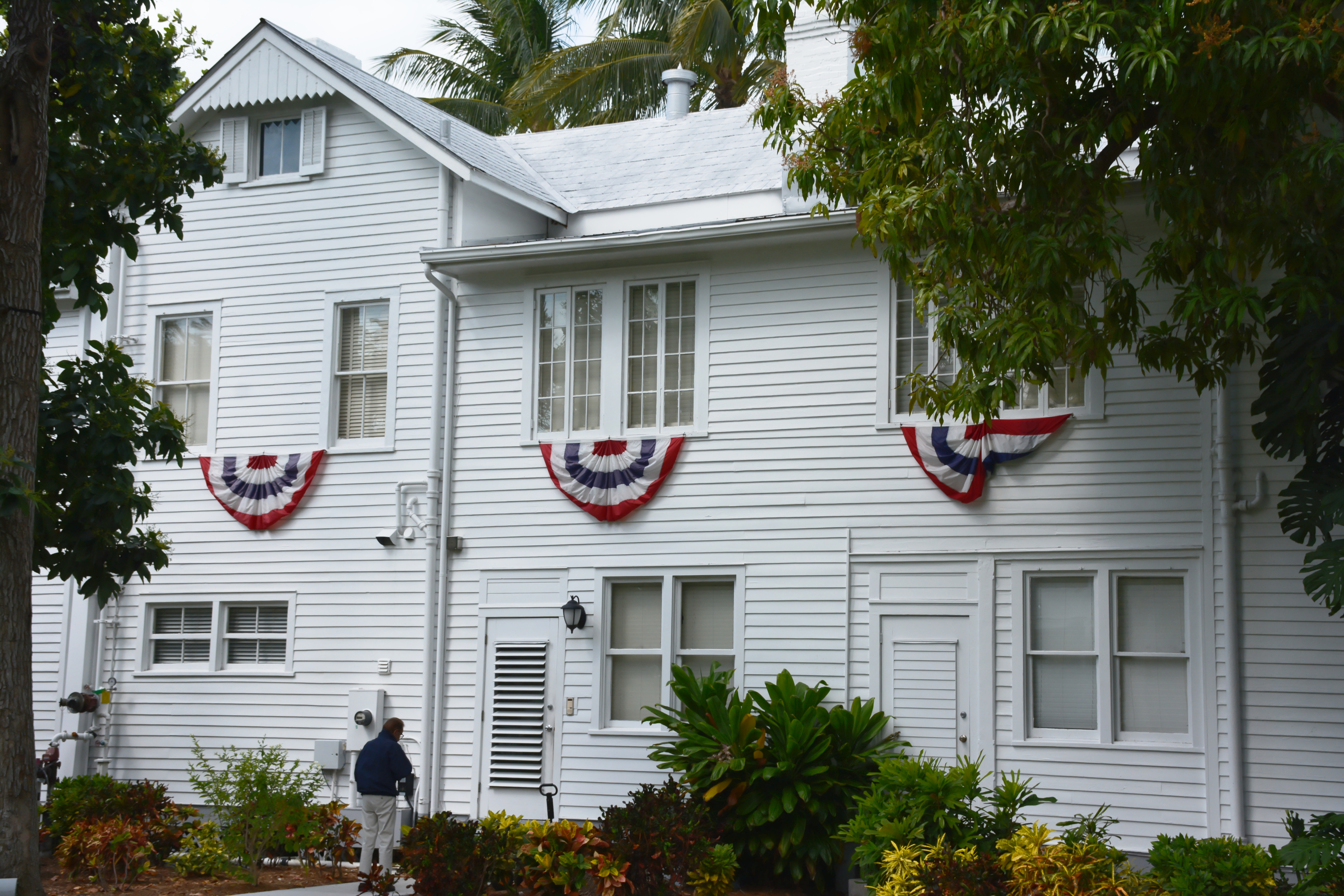

- Location within Florida Location within the United States
- Interactive map showing the Little White House’s location
- Location: Naval Station; Key West, Florida, U.S.
- Coordinates: 24.55627°N 81.8069°W
- Built: 1890
- Architect: Scott, McDermott & Higgs; U.S. Navy
- NRHP reference No.: 74000652
- Added to NRHP: February 12, 1974

The Harry S. Truman Little White House in Key West, Florida, United States, was the winter White House for President Harry S. Truman for 175 days during 11 visits. The house is located in the Truman Annex neighborhood of Old Town, Key West.

== History ==
The house was originally on the waterfront when it was built in 1890 as the first officer's quarters on the U.S. naval station. The house was designed in 1889 by Scott, McDermott & Higgs, a local architectural firm. The wooden duplex contained Quarters A for the base commandant and Quarters B for the paymaster.

In 1911, the building was converted into a single-family dwelling to house the base commandant, and additional land was filled in front of the house. The waterfront view was eventually blocked by a new building at the station.

The first President to visit the site was William Howard Taft in December 1912. He arrived by Flagler's Overseas Railroad and stayed in Key West before sailing to Panama to inspect the canal then under construction. During World War I, Thomas Edison resided in the house while donating his service to the war effort. He perfected 41 underwater weapons during his six-month stay. The house remained command headquarters through World War II.

=== Truman's use ===
In November 1946, President Harry S. Truman had finished 19 months in office, but was physically exhausted. His doctor, Wallace Graham, ordered a warm vacation. Truman arrived in November 1946. As he was leaving, he promised to return whenever he felt the need for rest. His second vacation came in March 1947. This set the pattern for additional visits every November–December and every February–March. Changing technology allowed the President to communicate with multiple political or world leaders at one time and he could summon staff to Key West for a meeting in three hours' flight from Washington. Most importantly, Truman realized that where the President was, the White House was. Documents issued from the Little White House read "The White House, US Naval Station, Key West, Florida." Truman spent 175 days of his presidency at the Little White House.

In 1948, James Forrestal met with the Joint Chiefs of Staff to hammer out the creation of the Department of Defense. This was called the Key West Agreement, named after the place where the basic outline for the document was agreed to at a meeting that took place from March 11 to March 14 on the base at Key West.

During the Truman visits, Cabinet members and foreign officials were regular visitors for fishing trips and poker games. Truman visited Key West shortly after his unexpected 1948 re-election and Division Street was renamed Truman Avenue in his honor.

After Truman left office, he returned to Key West several times and stayed at various other places.

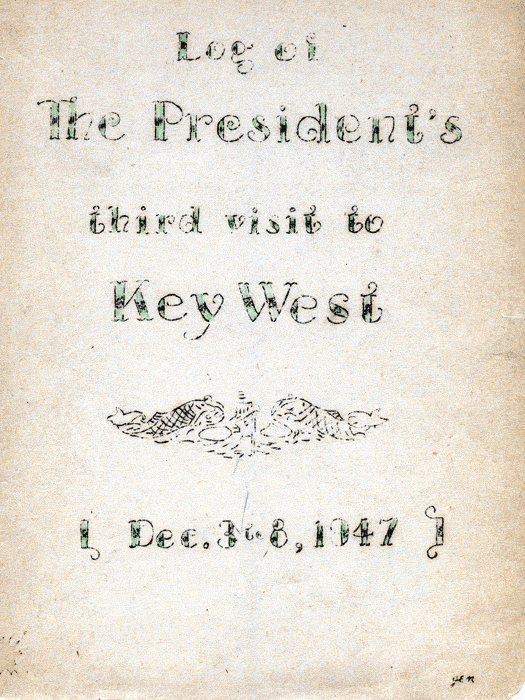
Official log of Harry Truman's December 3–8, 1947 visit to Key West, from the Harry S. Truman Presidential Library and Museum.

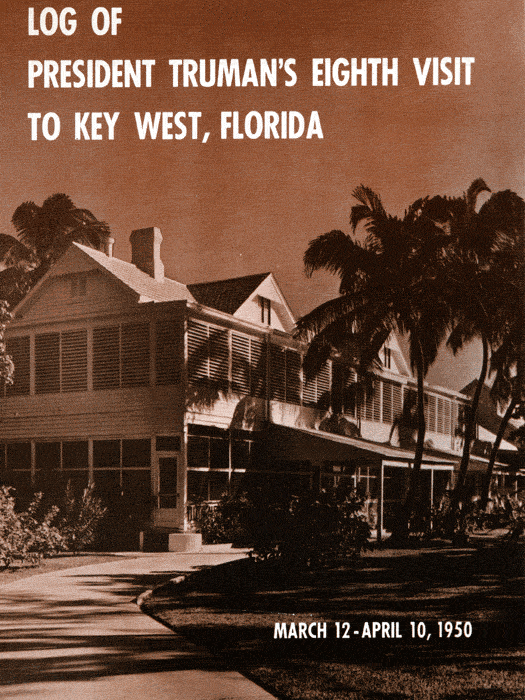
Official log of Harry Truman's March 12 to April 10, 1950 visit to Key West.

=== Post-Truman government use ===
In 1948–1949 General Dwight D. Eisenhower held a series of meetings that resulted in the creation of the Department of Defense. He returned in December 1955 and January 1956 as President to recuperate from a heart attack.

President John F. Kennedy and British Prime Minister Harold Macmillan held a one-day summit here in March 1961. President Kennedy made a second visit in 1962 immediately following the Cuban Missile Crisis.

The house served as the Naval Station’s commanding officer’s quarters until March 1974, when the submarine base was closed due to the Navy's conversion from diesel to nuclear submarines. On February 12 of that year, it was added to the U.S. National Register of Historic Places.

=== Conversion into a museum ===
On January 1, 1987, it was deeded to the State of Florida and is held in trust as a public museum. In 1990 almost a million dollars was spent restoring the house to its 1949 appearance. A 501(c)(3) organization is attempting to further the restoration and hold education conferences each Spring on Truman's impact upon today's society.

In 1991, the house opened as a state historic site & museum. Today regular guided tours take visitors through the site, and one can enter the rooms where the Trumans lived, worked and relaxed. Items such as President Truman's briefcase, books, telephone, and his famous "The Buck Stops Here" sign are still at his desk. (The reverse of the sign says, "I'm From Missouri.")

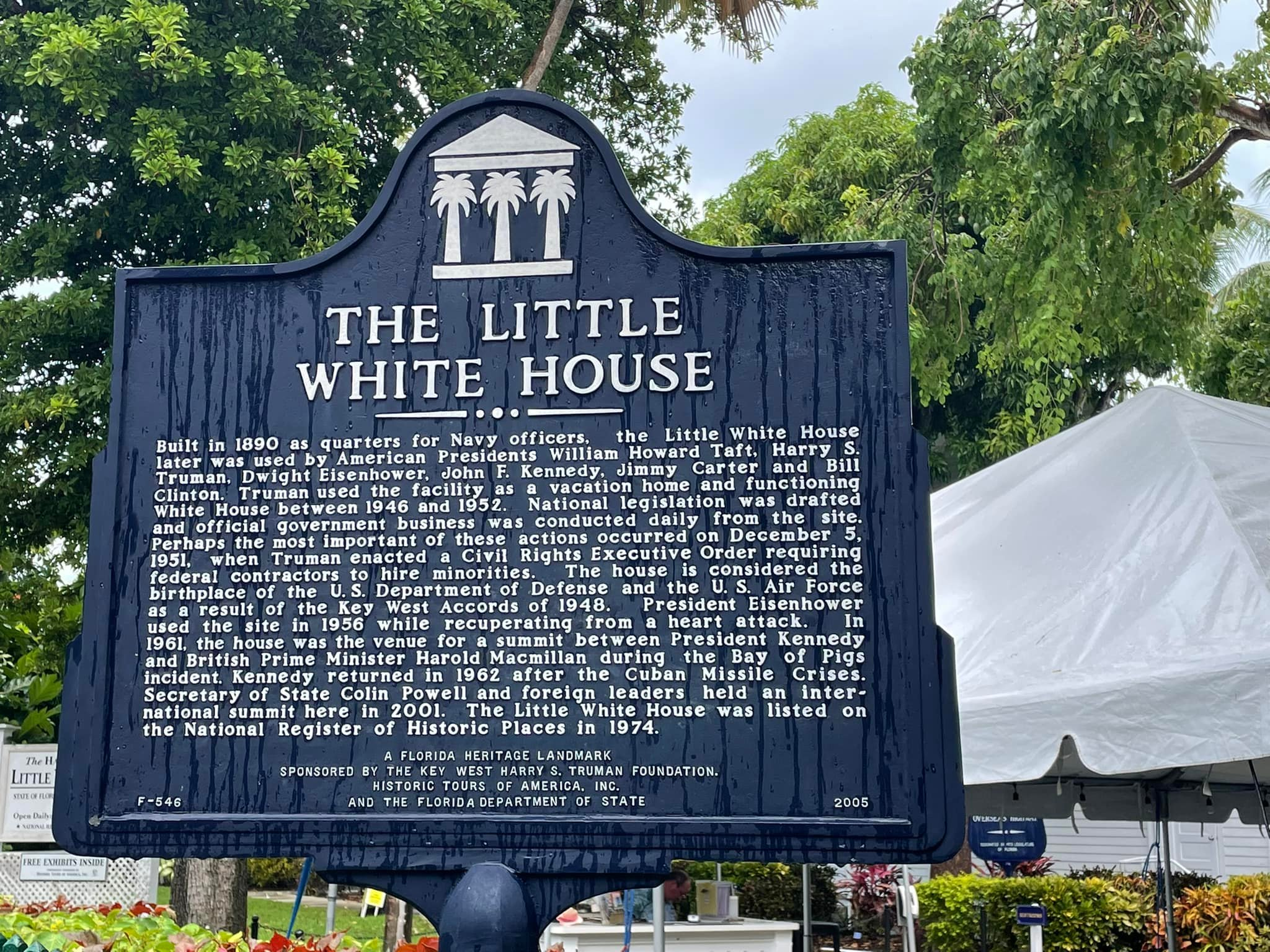
The information sign outside the museum

Former President Jimmy Carter and his family had a reunion here in 1996. In April 2001, Secretary of State Colin Powell opened a week of OSCE peace talks, led by Minsk Group Co-Chairman Carey Cavanaugh between President Robert Kocharyan of Armenia and Heydar Aliyev of Azerbaijan.

In January 2005, former President Bill Clinton and his wife, then Senator Hillary Clinton, spent a weekend relaxing at the house.

The Society of Presidential Descendants meets at the house, on Presidents' Day, for their annual forum.

== See also ==
- List of residences of presidents of the United States
- Mar-a-Lago
