= Richard Peacon House =

- U.S. Historic district – Contributing property
- Location within Florida Location within the United States
- Location: 712 Eaton Street, Key West, Florida,
- Coordinates: 24°33′33.3102″N 81°48′.9432″W
- Built: 1885
- Architectural style: Octagon mode

The Richard Peacon House, also known as the Octagon House, is an historic octagonal house located at 712 Eaton Street (formerly 2nd Avenue) in the Old Town district of Key West, Florida. It was built around 1885 for Richard Peacon (1840-1914), who was the owner of Key West's leading grocery store located at 800 Fleming Street and who later became a founding director of the Island City National Bank.

The Richard Peacon House is one of two extant (surviving) octagon houses in Key West, the other being located about two blocks to the northwest at 620 Dey Street. This may make the Peacon House the southernmost octagon house in the continental United States. In 1980, world-famous fashion designer Calvin Klein bought the house from New York interior designer Angelo Donghia. Klein sold it in 1987. In 2000, it was featured in the book, Key West Gardens and Their Stories.

Richard Peacon was born in Key West on August 21, 1840. His parents came from the Bahamas. In 2006, the Peacon family's Bahamian connection and 712 Eaton Street were mentioned in Preserving Paradise: The Architectural Heritage of the Florida Keys.

The Peacon House is one of many contributing properties in the Key West Historic District. It is also featured on a walking tour of historic Key West and its cemeteries.

== See also ==
- List of octagon houses
