= Old Town Manor =

Coordinates: 24.557320°N 81.803279°W

Old Town Manor, formerly Eaton Lodge, is a Victorian manor house and bed and breakfast inn in Key West, Florida. The building is located at 511 Eaton Street.

== History ==
The "Old Town" neighborhood is located on the west side of the island and is within the Key West Historic District. The district is listed on the National Register of Historic Places (NRHP). The property has served various uses: as a grocery and butcher shop, a residence with a doctor's office, a boardinghouse, and a bed and breakfast inn.

The property was built by Samuel Otis Johnson in 1886 as his grocery and butcher shop. Johnson had a shop adjacent to the house, which was moved to the rear of the property in the early 1900s for garage (carriage house) use. The house was extensively remodeled in 1937 by architect Jack Long, who kept its historic character intact. By then, the property had become the home and office of Dr. Richard William Warren and remained in the family until the death of his widow Genevieve Warren (known as "Miss Gen") in the early 1970s.

Old Town Manor is a three-story Victorian mansion built in the classical Greek Revival style. The main property still boasts the original cypress front door and much original woodwork, including moldings and some flooring. The lobby contains a fireplace and a built-in mahogany bookcase, with a Colonial staircase leading to the hall. The property is also home to the tallest cistern in the Keys, as the island depended on rainwater harvesting.

=== The Warren family ===
In 1911, Genevieve Allen married Dr. William Richard Warren, a Key West native and prominent surgeon and general practitioner. They had two sons (George Allen and William R. Jr.) and one daughter (Leonor). The Warrens bought the property at 511 Eaton Street in 1913.

Born in Key West and educated at the University of Pennsylvania, Dr. Warren practiced general medicine from the house. Its ground-floor front porch is said to have been the waiting room for patients, with interior rooms on site for physical examinations and minor surgeries.

Each story of the main property has a front porch, formerly called "piazzas" by Mrs. Warren. A descendant from one of the island's oldest families, she had a reputation for being an excellent hostess. She often entertained with informal luncheons in the garden and was famous for serving crawfish bisque, which she credited to her cook of 24 years, Maude Ashe.

In what is now the lobby of Old Town Manor, a portrait of Mrs. Warren's grandmother, Mary Nieves Ximenz Browne (of Spanish-Corsican ancestry), once hung above the living room mantel. Her grandparents came to the Keys from Saint Augustine in the early 1820s to be the first lighthouse keepers at Dry Tortugas, a remote set of islands located about 70 miles from Key West.

Mrs. Warren's father, George W. Allen, was president of the First National Bank of Key West and one of Florida's best-known Republicans; he served twice as senator and was nominated for governor in 1896.

According to the 1930 U.S. Census, when his home at 511 Eaton Street had a value of $8,000, William Richard Warren's father was born in Rhode Island, and his mother was born in the Bahamas.

511 Eaton Street boasted one of the first ornamental gardens of the Keys. Genevieve Warren framed her impressive orchid collection with winding red brick pathways and borders around circular planting areas. She had topsoil brought in from Florida's panhandle and utilized the unusual three-story cistern for watering. The thriving garden still contains a fishpond fountain, rare palms more than a century old, a Brazilian jacaranda tree with blue bell-shaped flowers, and two large tamarind trees native to India.

== Recognition and accolades ==
Old Town Manor and its sister property, Rose Lane Villas, are among the Keys' first certified members of the Florida Department of Environmental Protection's Green Lodging Program. Their green practices include purchasing recycled paper products, high-efficiency light bulbs, installing photo sensors for outdoor lighting, using environmentally sound cleaning products, and instituting a towel and linen reuse program.

Old Town Manor is a stop on the popular "Original Ghost Tour" and "Key West Ghosts."
