= Caroline Street (Key West) =

Street in Key West, Florida, USA

Coordinates: 24.558397°N 81.803969°W

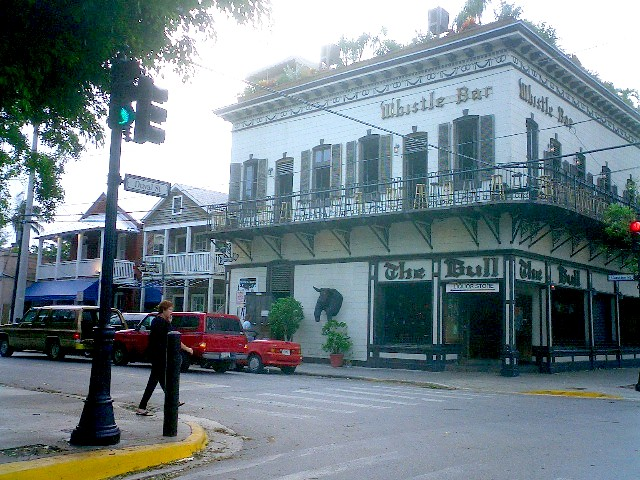
- The Bull and Whistle Bar at the corner of Caroline Street (left) and Duval Street (right)
- Interactive map of Caroline Street
- Maintained by: City of Key West
- Length: 0.5 mi (0.80 km)
- West end: Whitehead Street in Key West
- East end: Grinnell Street in Key West

Caroline Street is an iconic and historically significant local road on the island of Key West, Florida. It extends approximately 0.5 miles (0.80 km) northeastward to Grinnell Street from Whitehead Street at its southwest end. One of the oldest roads on the island, Caroline Street is surrounded by many old houses, inns, and historic landmarks, which are known for their seclusion from the street by dense landscaping. From its mostly residential origins between Whitehead and Elizabeth streets, Caroline becomes more commercial, punctuated by numerous businesses. Situated within the historic "Old Town" district, Caroline Street was part of the original infrastructural layout of the island at the time of its 1829 mapping by William Whitehead. Other than changes to both its termini, the majority of its route has remained unaltered since then. Caroline Street was named for a sibling of Whitehead; his brother, John, became interested in the island after a shipwreck left him stranded in 1819. The street and some of its surrounding area have been subject to long-term improvement and beautification efforts, beginning chiefly in 1996.

== Route description ==
At its southwesternmost point, Caroline Street begins on Whitehead Street at the Presidential Gates to the Truman Annex, the site of a former naval base that opened to the public in 1986. Caroline Street's

terminus on Whitehead is two blocks away from the southern terminus of U.S. Route 1. Between Whitehead and Telegraph Lane just a few hundred feet to the northeast, Caroline is a quiet, shaded street, before its left (northern) side opens up to a strip of businesses and shops. The road reaches its first major junction at Duval Street, yielding a largely commercialized zone; The Bull and Whistle Bar and Fogarty's Restaurant and Flying Monkeys Bar are situated at this intersection. However, upon leaving Duval, Caroline Street returns almost immediately to a chiefly residential road. Homes along this stretch of Caroline are noted for their architectural significance, representing a late-19th century "conch style" that incorporates elements of several more prominent styles, including Victorian and Colonial. Although many of these houses were constructed quickly and cheaply, their builders employed the same techniques that were used at the time to craft boats, lending them resistance to extreme weather. Described as "stately", their lots are heavily landscaped, leaving several secluded.

The only interruption of this residential stretch is a minor junction with one-way Ann Street, which terminates at Caroline with little fanfare. Further northeast, Caroline intersects Simonton Street to a less commercial degree than Duval. Another block of shaded residences follows before an intersection with Elizabeth Street about midway between Caroline's termini. Elizabeth serves as a sort of transition point for Caroline, which becomes lined with small shops as it meets Peacon Lane; Peacon is a one-way street that approaches from the south. As Caroline continues toward the northeast, it crosses William Street and offers an obscured view of the Gulf of Mexico side of the island and vessels at port. Here, the road's "homely marine practicality" becomes evident, according to a Florida travel writer.

Between William and Margaret Street, Caroline passes numerous restaurants and parking for the Key West Bight, which remains visible and can also be accessed by bearing left on Margaret. At the junction of the two roads are several stores and the starting point of the Conch Tour Train. The Key West Bight is recognizable by the large Wyland mural on the entrance of the Key West Waterfront Brewery. The final several hundred feet of Caroline Street are uneventful, limited to the backdrop of a few houses and businesses. Paralleling the Bight, Caroline comes to an end at Grinnell Street, having traveled almost exactly 0.5 miles (0.80 km).

== History and culture ==
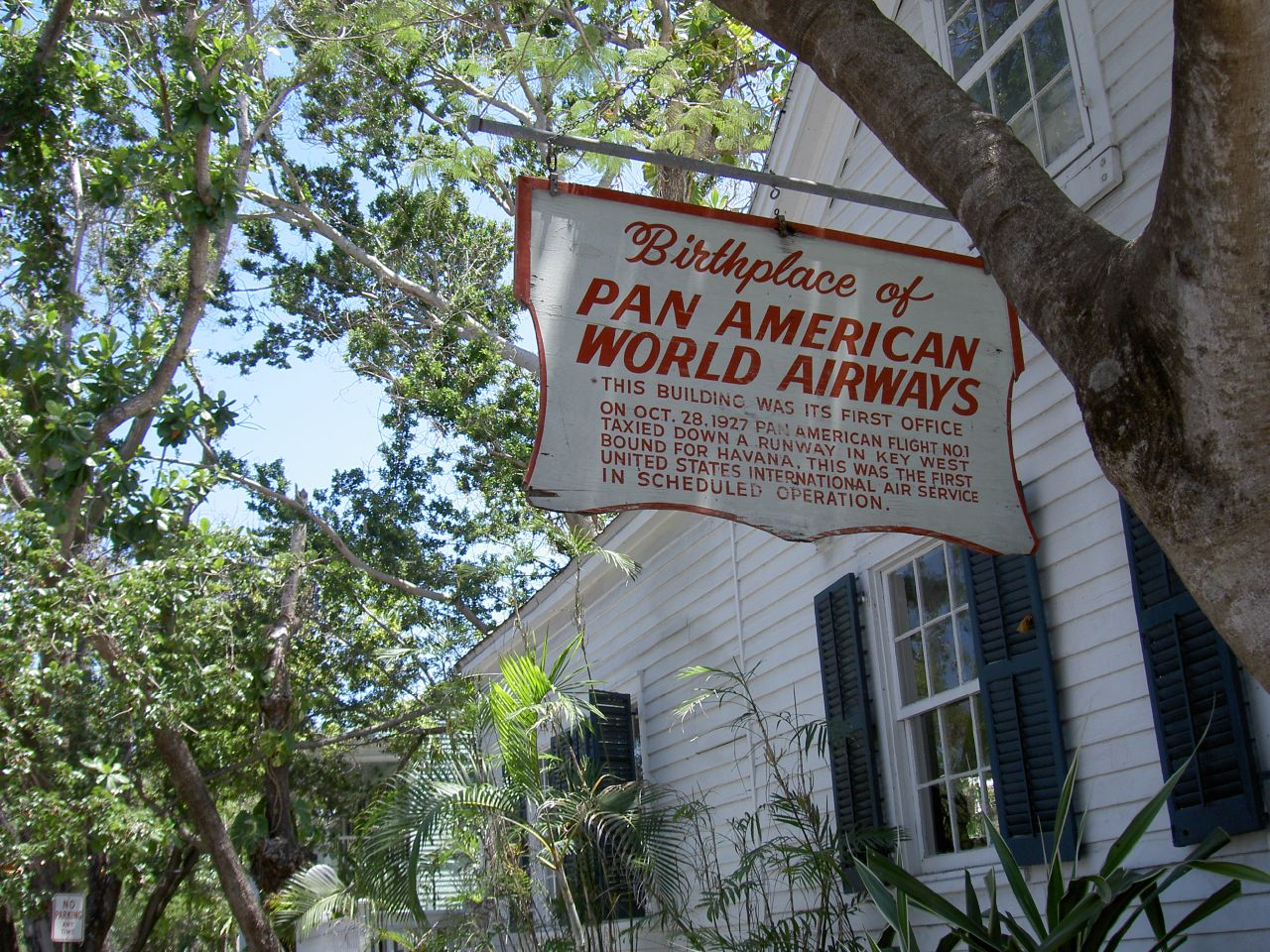
Original office of Pan American World Airways at Caroline and Whitehead

Caroline Street is situated along the northwestern side of the island, in a historic district known as Old Town Key West. Part of the district, roughly defined as the area between Caroline Street and Angela Streets (which run parallel about four blocks apart), harbors many old houses, some of which belonged to famous writers and other influential persons. For example, the Dr. Joseph Y. Porter House at 429 Caroline Street was home to the first public health inspector in the state of Florida. The Porter House was added to the National Register of Historic Places in 1973. Many of the houses in the area have been converted into inns; the Curry Mansion Inn at the corner of Caroline and Ann streets was originally built in 1855 for the Currys, a prominent local family. At Caroline Street's southern terminus across from the Presidential Gates is the Airways Building, which served as the original Pan American World Airways office during its formation in 1927.

Caroline Street, along with Margaret, William, Thomas, and Emma streets, were named for siblings of John Whitehead, who—in 1819—became stranded on Key West after a shipwreck and took note of the island's strategic geography. Whitehead's brother, William, surveyed the city of Key West in 1829. The original map from William Whitehead's survey shows the northwestern corner of the island, bounded by present-day Angela Street, designated as "town plot". This plot was the only part of the island which had a grid-like pattern of streets: five running southwest to northeast, including the path of Caroline Street, at least a dozen oriented from southeast to northwest, and Front Street, which borders the extreme northwestern coast of the island. Therefore, Caroline was cleared by 1829 at the latest, making it among the oldest streets in either the city or the island of Key West. When it received its name, however, is unclear.

Currently, Caroline never reaches water at either ends. The 1829 map, however, shows it accessing the Gulf of Mexico at both termini. Whereas the road now starts at Whitehead, it once continued past both Whitehead and Front to the shore. This is confirmed by a map of the island from the early 1900s, which depicts Caroline abutting a breakwater at its southwestern end. Eventually, the street was excluded from the lot of the Truman Annex, and disconnected from the water at its northeastern terminus by the construction of the former City Electric Power Plant on new land.

Since 1996, the upper Caroline Street corridor and Key West Bight have been part of ongoing improvement efforts spearheaded by the City of Key West and funded by a special property tax system. At the beginning of the project, the area, once dominated by commercial fishing, had been falling into disarray as its practical future became uncertain. The dynamics of the project changed throughout its course; in early 2011, the city approved spending for specific updates to infrastructure along the corridor, including improved lighting and signs, a more extensive sidewalk system, and versatility with regard to bicycle and pedestrian traffic. As recently as February 2012, additional requests for improvements were lodged with $720,000 available for the project.

== In popular culture ==
Early in his career, Jimmy Buffett co-wrote "Woman Goin' Crazy on Caroline Street" with Steve Goodman. Buffett released the song on his 1976 album, Havana Daydreamin'.

== See also ==
- Historic Seaport
- Florida Keys
