= Key West Aquarium =

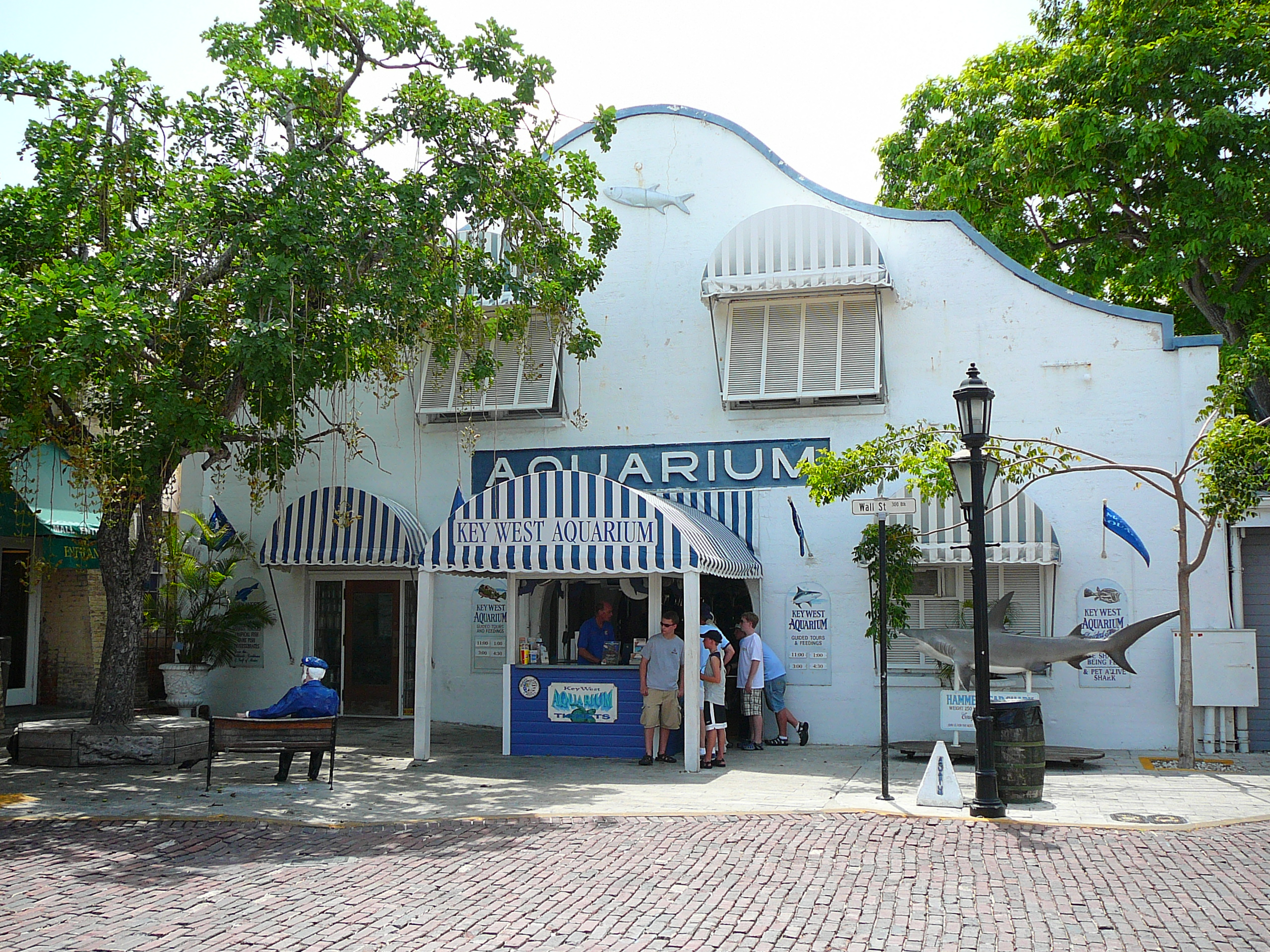
- Aquarium entrance
- Interactive map of Key West Aquarium
- 24.5590437°N 81.8073156°W
- Date opened: 1934
- Location: Key West, Florida, United States
- Website: www.keywestaquarium.com

The Key West Aquarium is the only public aquarium in Key West, Florida, United States. It is located at 1 Whitehead Street and is marked by Historic Marker 52.

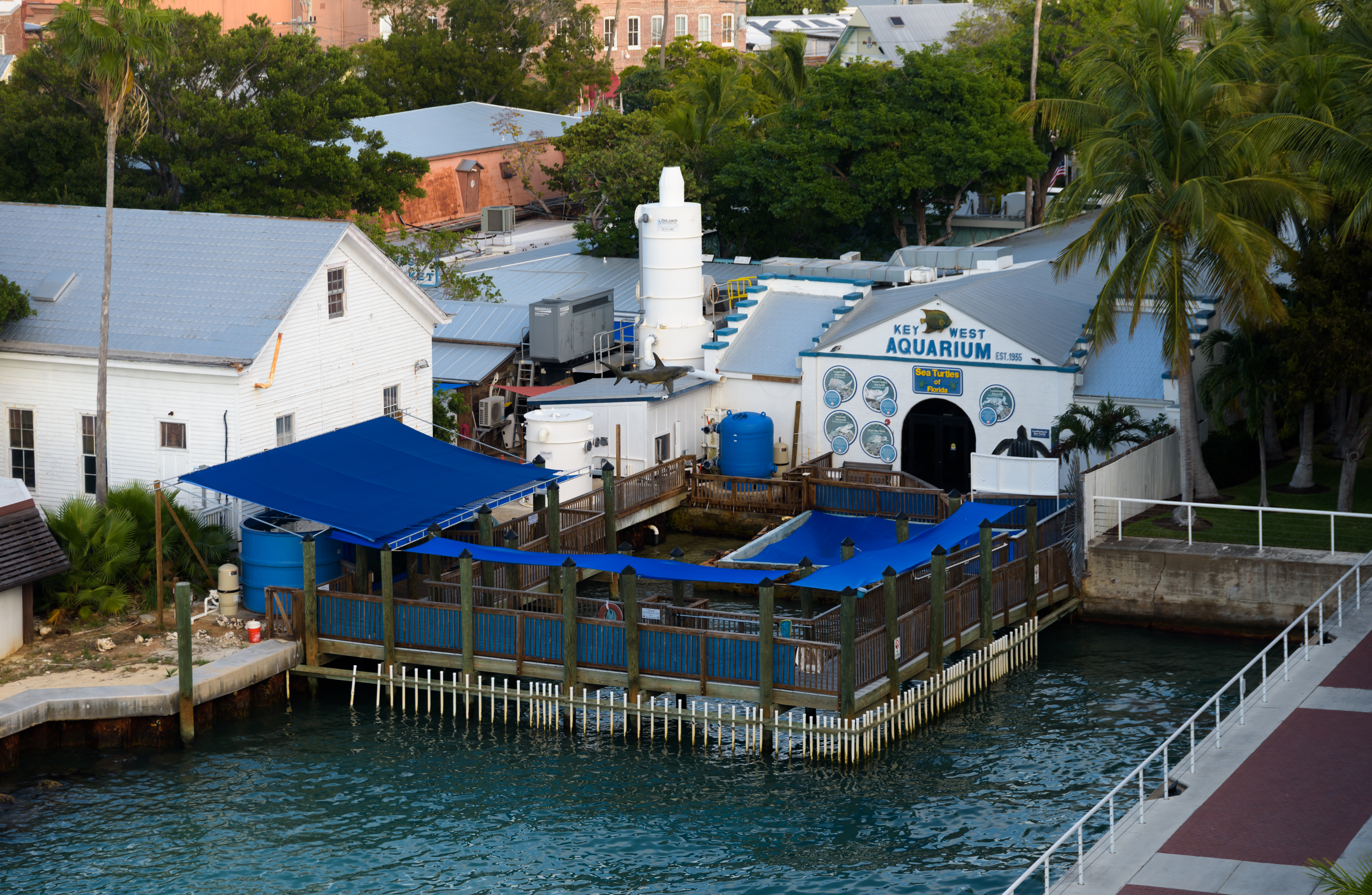
The aquarium viewed from the west

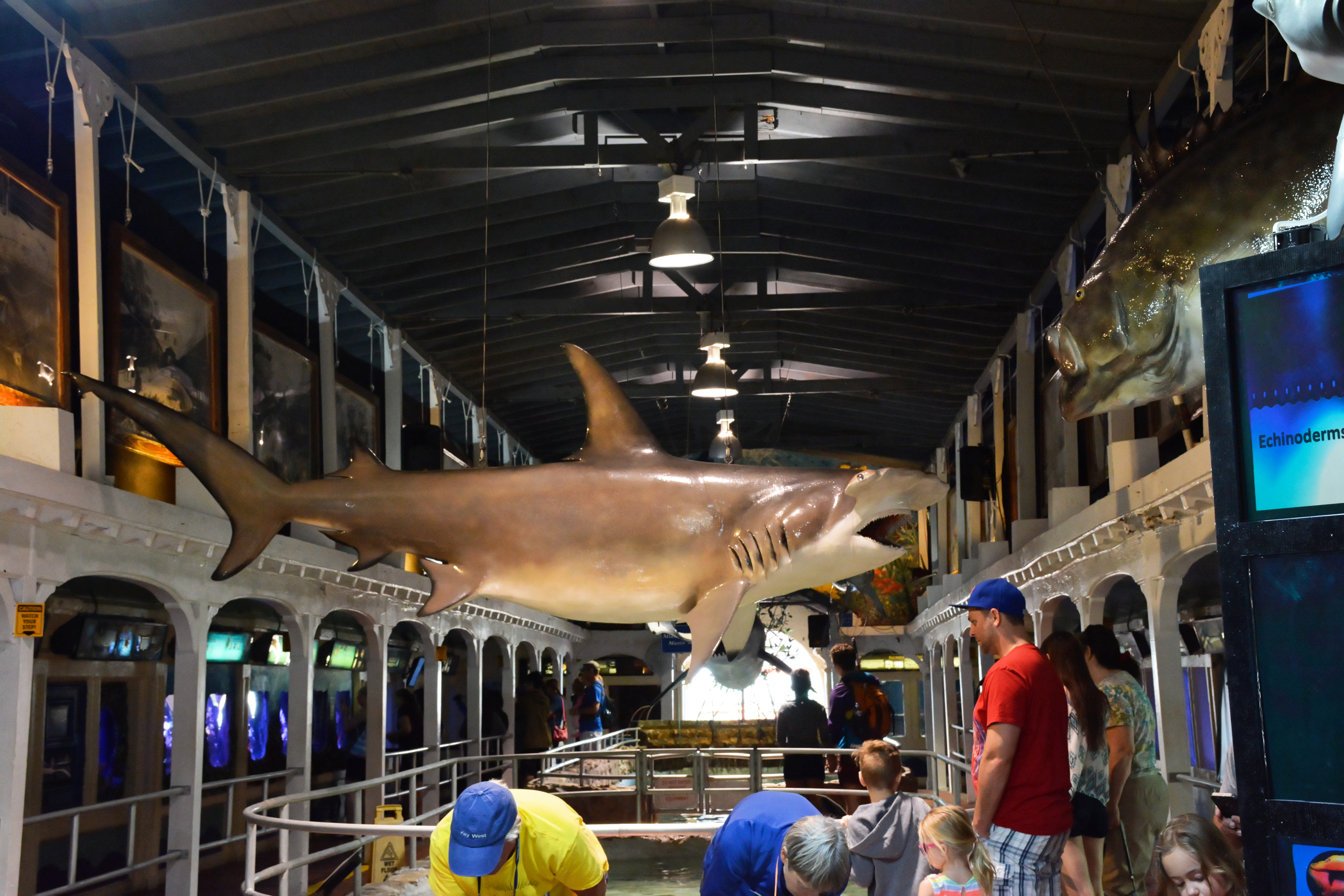
Inside the aquarium

== History ==
Built between 1932 and 1934, the Key West Aquarium is one of Florida's oldest aquariums. Original admission was 15 cents for adults and 5 cents for children. The aquarium opened to the public in 1935, and at the time it was "the first open-air aquarium in the United States."

The aquarium was conceived by Dr. Robert Van Deusen, the Director of the Fairmount Park Aquarium in Philadelphia. The aquarium was originally an open air aquarium, one of the first and largest at the time.

During the Great Depression, Key West turned over its charter to the federal government due to the economic disaster that hit the island. The federal government believed that Key West's weather and location would make it an ideal tourist destination. The Works Project Administration (WPA) was sent in and built the tourist attraction.

The aquarium underwent recent restoration and refurbishment, including the addition of air conditioning and new "entryway façade, completed in 2023." Clinton Curry, the Historic Tours of America’s Director of Operations, worked on the restoration project in hopes of re-theming the exhibits "to tell the story of the unique marine ecosystems found throughout the Keys, as well as the hard-working people who make their living off these significant resources.”

As a result of this restoration project, the City of Key West "received the Historic Florida Keys Foundation's Award of Excellence for rehabilitating the Key West Aquarium." The award was accepted by "Historic Tours of America's Clinton Curry, City Manager Al Childress, and the City Historic Preservationist Enid Torregrosa."

== Exhibits ==
The aquarium is home to exhibits on alligators, atlantic shore fish, jellyfish, sharks, sea turtles, and a touch tank.

The touch tank includes animals such as conchs, sea stars, slate pencil sea urchins, sea cucumbers, hermit crabs, and horseshoe crabs.

== Relevance in pop culture ==
James Merrill wrote about the Key West Aquarium in his poem Key West Aquarium: The Sawfish.
