= Southernmost House =

Coordinates: 24.54686°N 81.796505°W

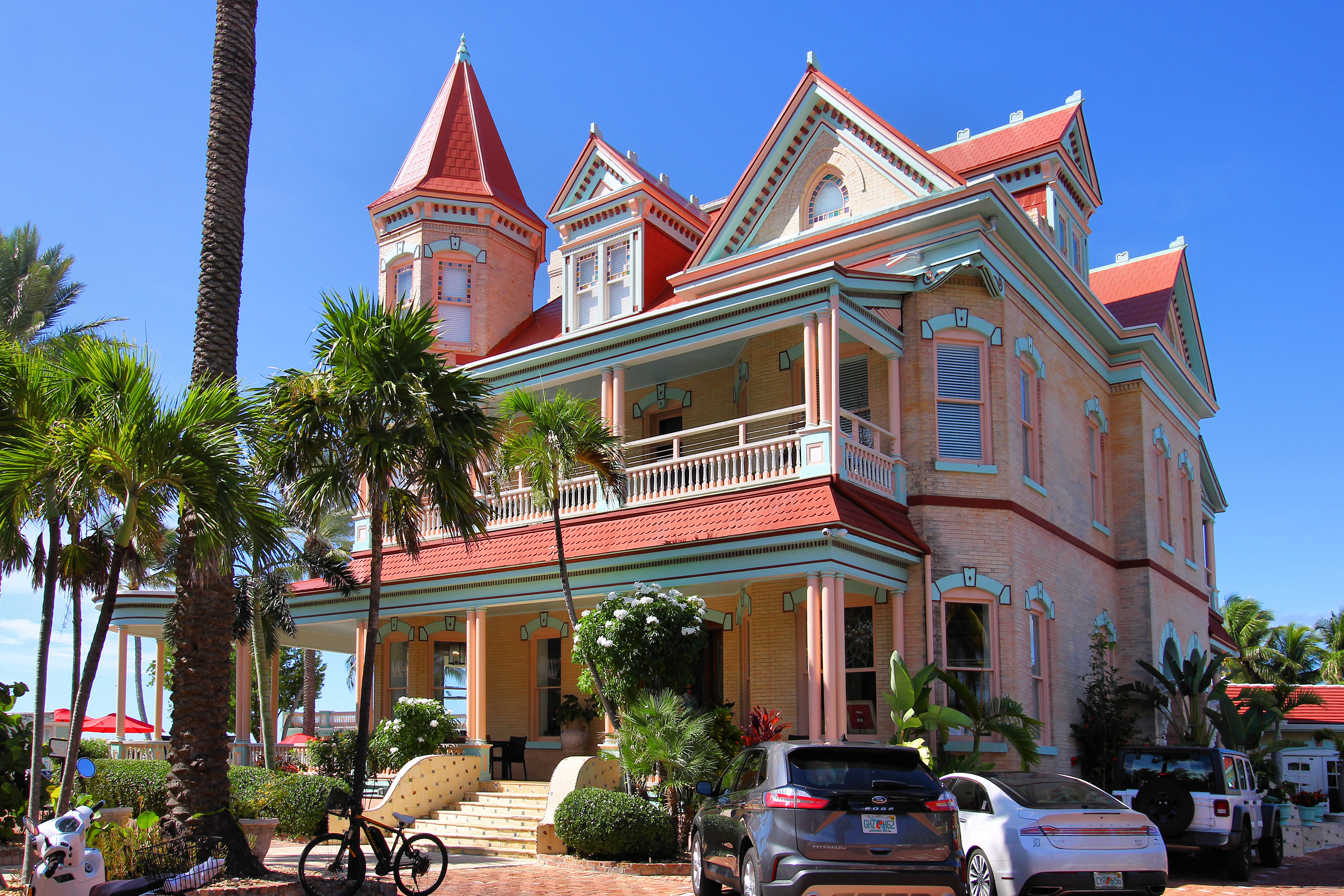
The Southernmost House Historic Inn

The Southernmost House is a historic mansion in the U.S. city of Key West, in Monroe County, Florida. Five U.S. Presidents have stayed there. The house is located in the Upper Duval district and has been converted into a bed and breakfast.

== History ==
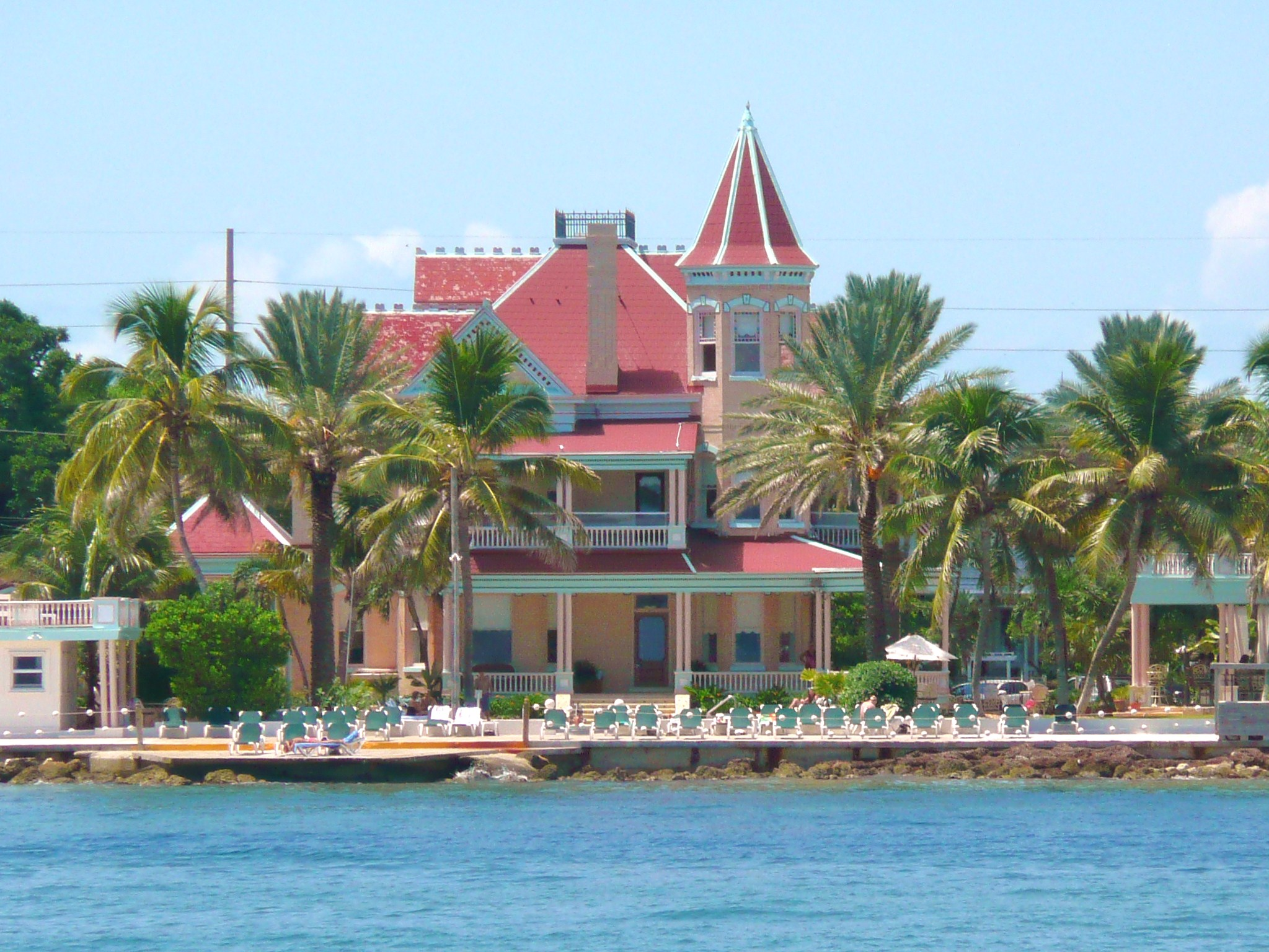
Southernmost House as seen from the Atlantic Ocean

Judge Jeptha Vining Harris built the mansion that is now called the Southernmost House in 1897 for $250,000. His wife was the youngest daughter of William Curry, one of Florida’s first millionaires. The Curry family were builders with eight mansions in the Historic District of Key West. The Harris family were prominent citizens at the turn of the century and had invested in Henry Flagler's Overseas Railroad to Key West, often entertaining him at the mansion during the railroad's construction.

The house is Queen Anne Victorian style, and was designed as a one-bedroom mansion. It has open-water views, public rooms, two story balconies, and large stained glass windows. The Southernmost House was the first home in Key West with electricity, and Mrs. Harris was able to engage Thomas Edison to oversee the electrical design and installation for the house. In the 1930s air conditioning was installed.

During the Prohibition period from 1919-1933 the mansion served as a speakeasy. The first floor was a restaurant; the second floor was used for casino gambling and the third floor for "socializing". During this period, celebrities and notorious gangsters who were en route to Havana often visited the mansion.

In the 1940s the mansion was operated as a nightclub called "Cafe Cayo Hueso," hosting Ernest Hemingway, Tennessee Williams, Gore Vidal, Truman Capote, Tallulah Bankhead, Gloria Swanson, Louis Armstrong, and Charles Lindbergh.

In 1949 the mansion was completely renovated for use as a private residence by Hilario Ramos. Hilario Ramos an immigrant from Spain, married into a wealthy family who owned Lopez Wholesale Liquors, a distributor of many brands including Anheuser-Busch products. Since then many dignitaries and heads of state have stayed at the mansion. Among these are King Juan Carlos of Spain and five American Presidents: Harry Truman, Dwight Eisenhower, John F. Kennedy, Richard Nixon and Jimmy Carter.

In 2016, the mansion was inducted into the Historic Hotels of America program. The Southernmost House is being operated as an 18-room bed and breakfast. The property was renamed in 2023 as ″The Mansion on the Sea″.

== See also ==
- Southernmost point buoy
