= Dr. Joseph Y. Porter House =

- U.S. National Register of Historic Places
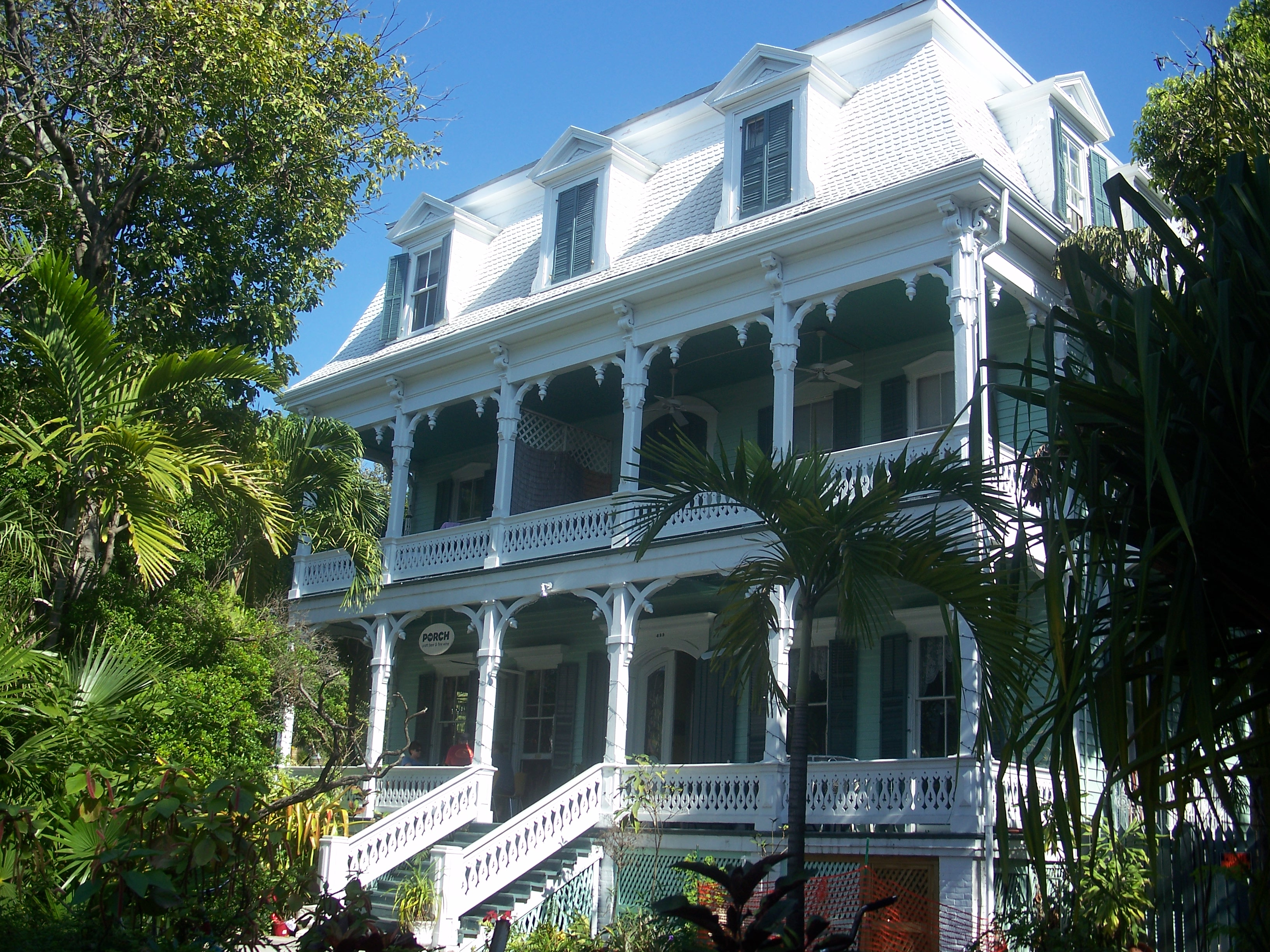
- Front of the Porter House

- Location within Florida Location within the United States
- Location: Key West, Florida
- Coordinates: 24°33′26″N 81°48′17″W
- Architectural style: Late Victorian
- NRHP reference No.: 73000588
- Added to NRHP: June 4, 1973

The Dr. Joseph Y. Porter House is a historic home in Key West, Florida, United States. It is located at 429 Caroline Street. On June 4, 1973, it was added to the National Register of Historic Places.

The original construction was built in 1838 by Judge James Webb, the first Federal Judge of the Southern District of the Florida Territory.

The house is best known as the lifelong home of Dr. Joseph Yates Porter Jr. His father bought the property in 1845. Porter lived in the home for 80 years, dying in the same room he was born. He was Key West's first native-born physician and Florida's first Public Health Officer from 1889 to 1917. He was instrumental in controlling yellow fever, reforming sanitation and quarantine practices, and initiating health legislation. Porter was among the first physicians to recognize yellow fever as transmissible by mosquitoes.
