= Thompson Fish House, Turtle Cannery and Kraals =

- U.S. National Register of Historic Places
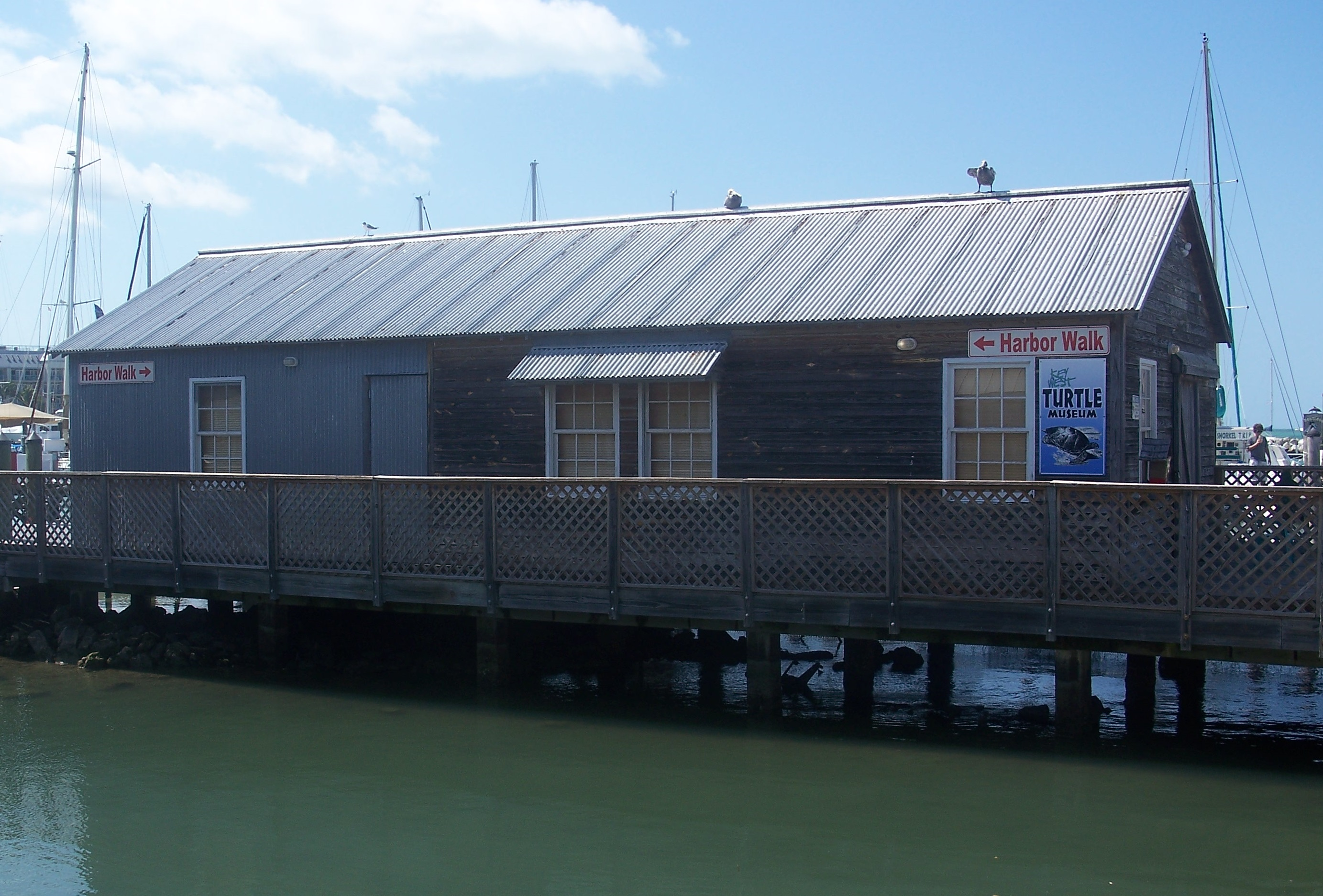

- Location within Florida Location within the United States
- Location: 200 Margaret St., Key West, Florida
- Coordinates: 24°33′42″N 81°48′4″W
- Built: 1918
- NRHP reference No.: 94000633
- Added to NRHP: June 23, 1994

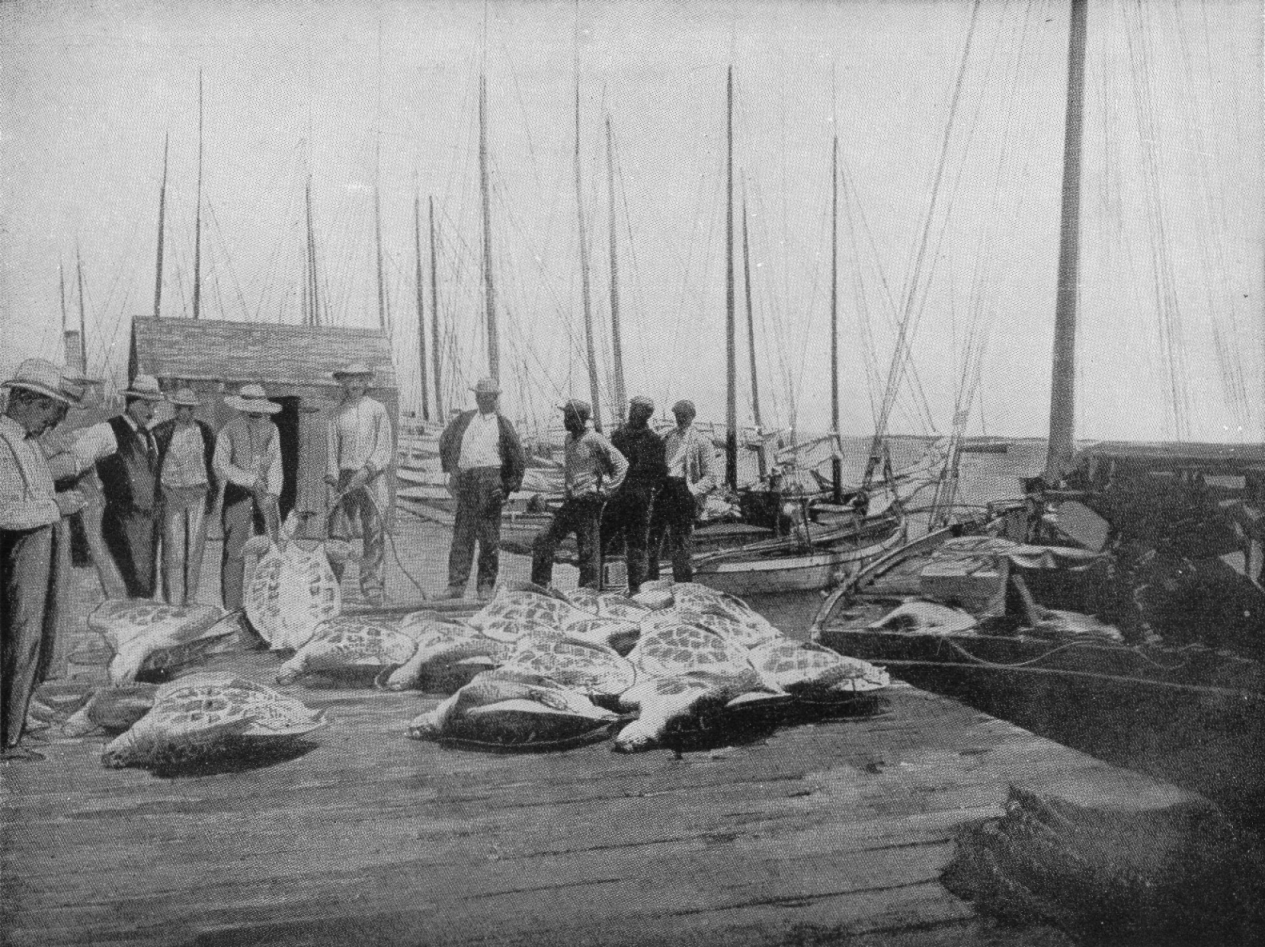
Old sketch depicting the turtle cannery and kraals in Key West

The Thompson Fish House, Turtle Cannery and Kraals is a historic site located at 200 Margaret Street, Key West, Florida, United States. On June 23, 1994, it was added to the U.S. National Register of Historic Places.

The kraals were fenced-in holding pens adjacent to the cannery in a sheltered bay at the north end of town, where turtles were kept awaiting slaughter. The once-fashionable turtle meat was canned and sold to cooks who used it largely to make turtle soup. The valuable Tortoiseshell was used to make many kinds of products made today from plastic.

The building is owned by the City of Key West, and currently houses exhibits from the nearby Mel Fisher Maritime Heritage Museum. The Turtle Kraals Museum, which educated the public about dangers to sea turtles, was formerly located at this site.
