= Neighborhoods in Key West, Florida =

List of neighborhoods within the city limits of Key West, Florida

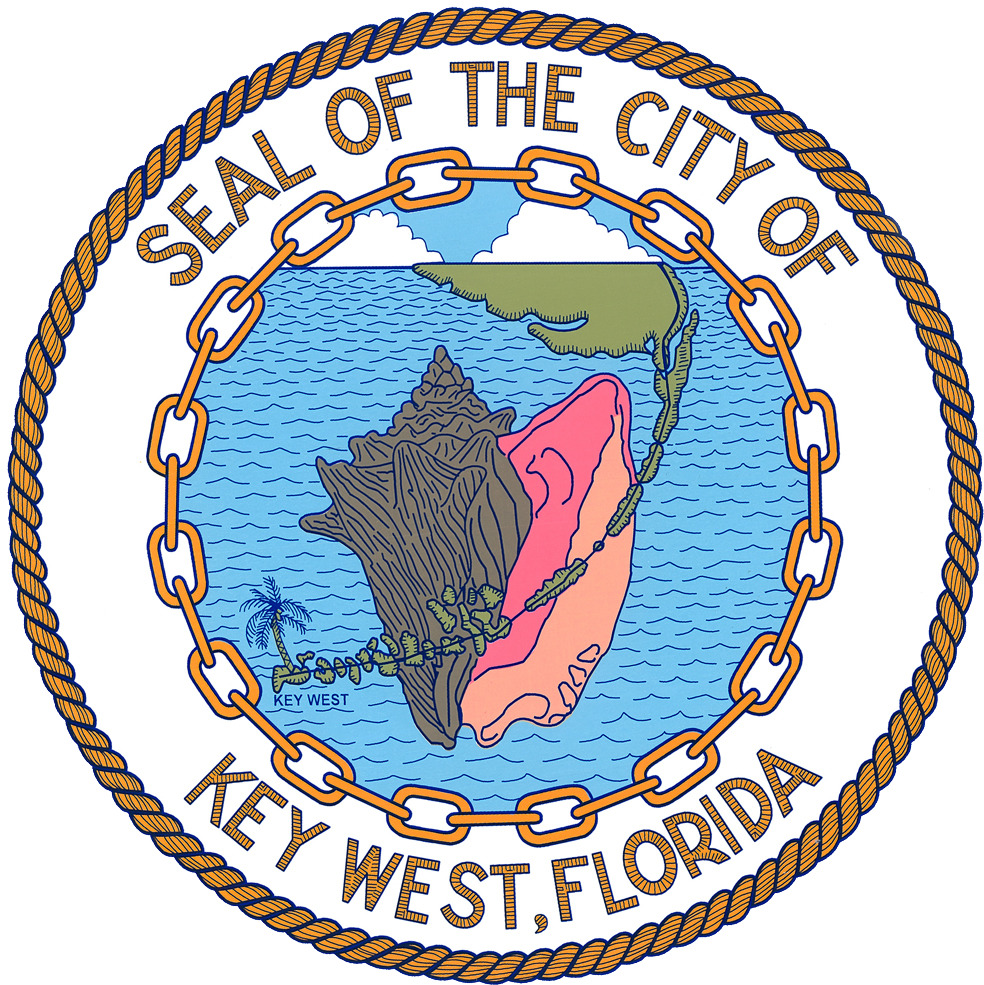
Seal of the City of Key West, FL

The following is a list of the neighborhoods within the city limits of Key West, Florida.

== Key West Island ==
=== Bahama Village ===
It is located southwest of downtown, in Old Town. It covers over a 16 block area that lies west of Whitehead Street and south of Truman Annex, bordered by Whitehead, Southard, Fort and Louisa Streets.

It was once a primarily black neighborhood, and is named for its many original residents who were of Bahamian ancestry. Once a marginalized area, it is undergoing gentrification and now hosts many of the island's most popular restaurants.

It contains the city of Key West's public swimming pool.

While the sign announcing the entrance to Bahama Village remains, the area as depicted in the picture has since been transformed from a shopping area into a restaurant (current as of Sept 2016).

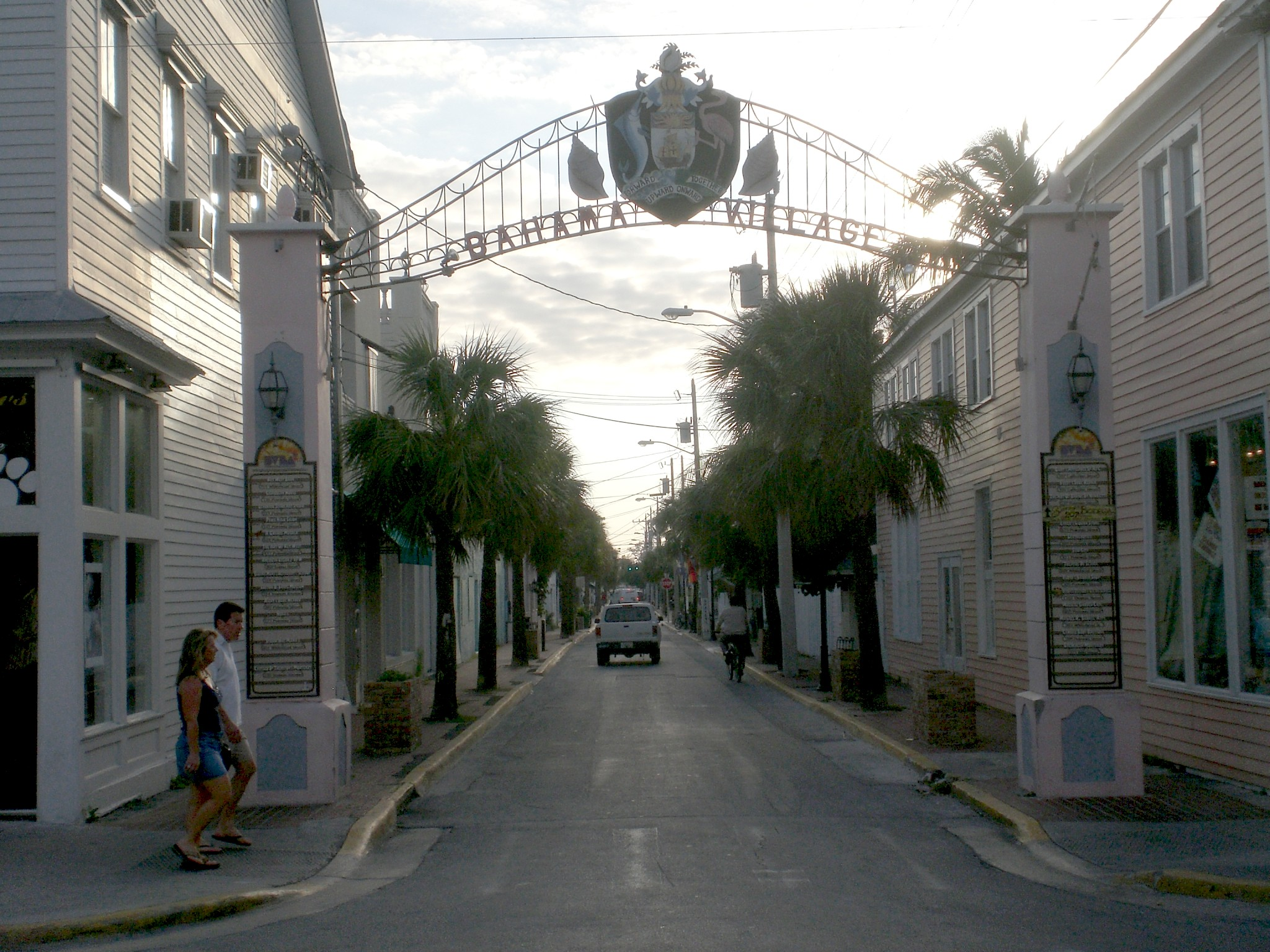
Petronia Street entrance on Duval Street

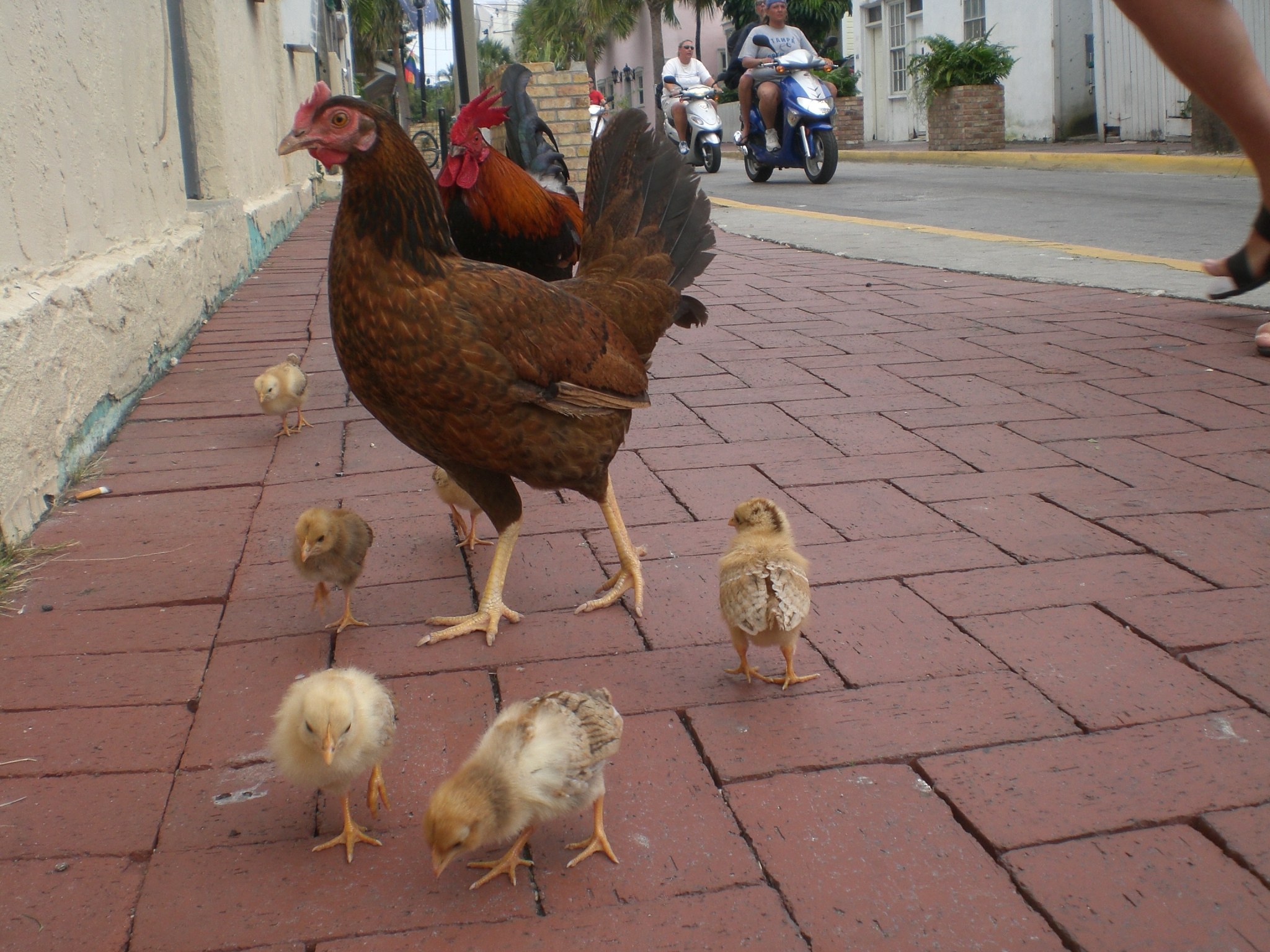
One of the many free roaming chicken families that can be seen in Key West

=== Casa Marina ===
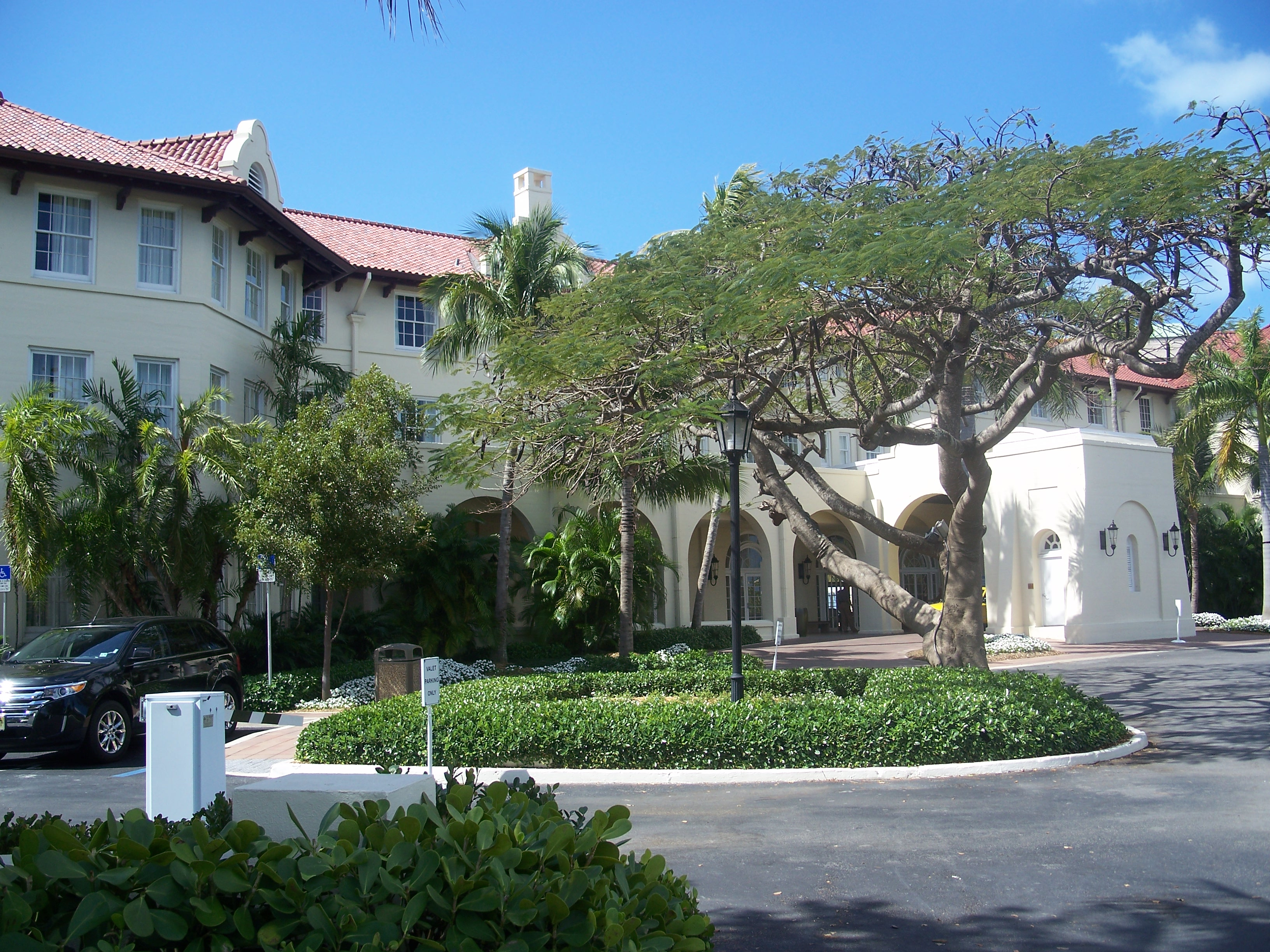
The Casa Marina hotel

It is bounded by United, Vernon and White Streets, Atlantic Boulevard and Steven Avenue. It is named for Henry Flagler's hotel of the same name in the area.

=== Historic Seaport ===
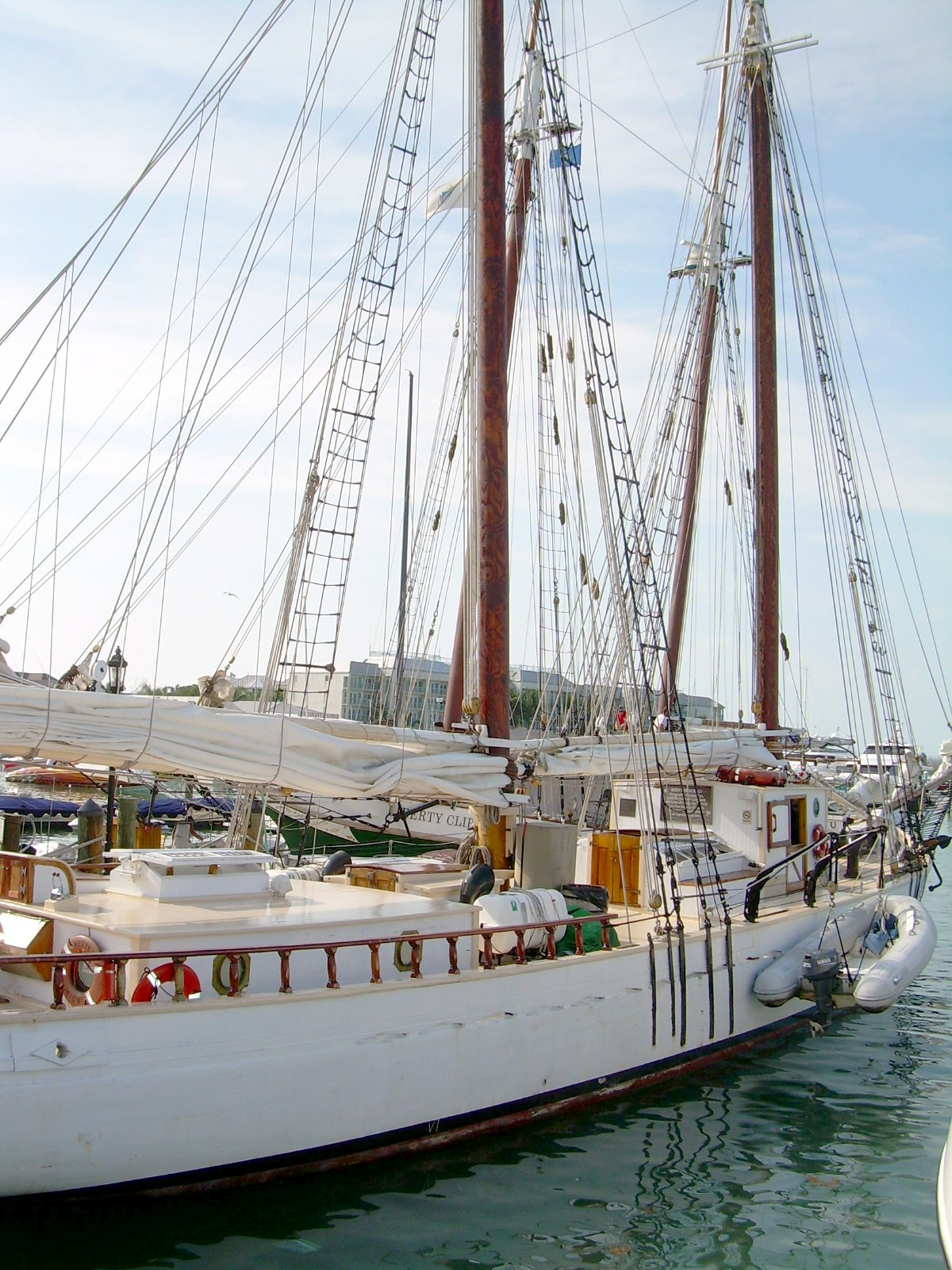
The historic Western Union schooner is located in the Historic Seaport District

It is located to the northeast of Fleming Street, and bounded by White and Whitehead Streets. This area is sometimes referred to as Seaport Heights.

The port is at Key West Bight.

=== The Meadows (Key West) ===
It is bounded by White and Angela Streets, Eisenhower Drive and Truman Avenue (U.S. Route 1).

=== Midtown (Key West) ===
It is located in the geographical center of the island, and roughly bounded by North Roosevelt Boulevard (U.S. Route 1), Leon Street, Atlantic Boulevard and 1st Avenue.

=== New Town (Key West) ===
It is located on the eastern side of the island, and roughly defined as the part of the island that is east of 1st Street and north of Flagler Avenue.

=== Poinciana Plaza ===
The housing units were built in the mid-1950s for naval housing. They temporarily closed down in the late 1980s and 1990s. They reopened in late 1998. The Base Realignment and Closure Commission proved to be a boon for affordable housing in Key West. The City was able to successfully negotiate a deal with the Navy for transfer of ownership of the Poinciana Plaza housing complex resulting in 154 affordable housing units added to the Housing Authority's control.

=== Upper Duval ===
It is roughly bounded by the Atlantic Ocean, Whitehead Street, Truman and Vernon Avenues.

=== White Street Gallery District ===
It is located in the geographical center of the island, and is bounded by White and Leon Streets, and Truman and Flagler Avenues. The Eduardo H. Gato House is here.

== Other Islands ==
=== Northern part of Stock Island ===
Stock Island is split by U.S. 1, where the north of U.S. 1 is part of the City of Key West and south of U.S. 1 is part of unincorporated Monroe County, FL. All of the northern part of Stock Island is accessible from College Road, formerly Junior College Road, which derives its name from the being the main campus of the College of the Florida Keys.

Although it is north of U.S. 1, Key Haven is not part of the City of Key West, but is an unincorporated community in Monroe County, Fl, and it is separated from College Road by channel of water on the Gulf of Mexico side of the FL Keys.

Along College Road are the main campus of the College of the Florida Keys, the Rees Jones Designed 18-hole Key West Golf Club course and the Key West Golf Club Homeowners Association, Gerald Adams Elementary School, the Lower Keys Medical Center Hospital with an emergency room, the Palm Vista Nursing and Rehabilitation facility, the Florida Keys SPCA, the Key West Dept. of Transportation, the Monroe County Building Dept., the Monroe County Sheriff's administrative offices, the Monroe County Sheriff's Jail and its Animal Farm, the Florida Keys Aqueduct Authority, the Key West Tropical Forest and Botanical Gardens, the Key West Power Squadron, the Key West Golf Club Homeowners Association, Garden View apartments and Sunset Marina.

==== Key West Golf Club HOA ====
Key West Golf Club is a private homeowner association community nestled among the fairways and greens of the Key West Golf Course and constructed to protect natural fresh and saltwater ponds and vegetation. The development of this community was started in 1996. There are 390 homes in this planned unit development of varying size built over approximately 46.5 acres. Amenities include a resort pool, small pool, butterfly garden and community center that houses a fitness center, restrooms, association office and association meeting space.

===== Other College Road Residences =====
College Road residences consists of Sunset Marina, Garden View, and Palm Vista. Additionally, College Road

Sunset Marina encompasses 20 floating docks and a variety of styles of apartments nestled in a protective cove. Immediate access to the Gulf of Mexico and easy access to the Atlantic Ocean. Sunset Marina is home to talented Key West fishing guides who offer charters daily. We cater to sail and power boats. A sailing school makes their home here and offers hands on classes for beginners or seasoned sailors.

Garden View is new construction of a 104-unit multi-family housing development on Stock Island. The project consists of 103 one-bedroom Workforce Housing Units which will be rented by the Key West Housing Authority and one Office Unit. The project has three residential structures spaced around a 2.66-acre site to allow the maximum circulation. The structures are referred to as “Building A”, “Building B”, and “Building C”. Building A will have five units, Building B will have sixty-six units, and Building C will have thirty-three units. There are 125 parking spaces provided between the parking under the buildings and the open-air parking around the new road.

Palm Vista Nursing and Rehabilitation is a skilled nursing facility committed to clinical excellence.
