= Stock Island, Florida =

- Census-designated place
- Location in Monroe County and the state of Florida

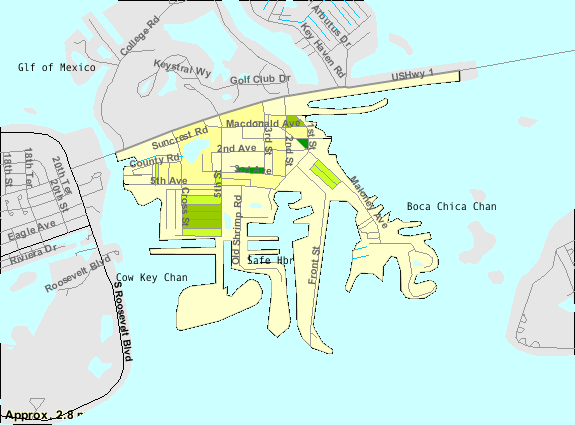
- U.S. Census Bureau map showing CDP boundaries
- Coordinates: 24°33′57″N 81°44′06″W
- Country: United States
- State: Florida
- County: Monroe

Area
  - Total: 2.10 sq mi (5.45 km^{2})
  - Land: 0.84 sq mi (2.17 km^{2})
  - Water: 1.27 sq mi (3.28 km^{2})
- Elevation: 3 ft (0.91 m)

Population (2020)
  - Total: 4,722
  - Density: 5,644.2/sq mi (2,179.22/km^{2})
- Time zone: UTC-5 (Eastern (EST))
  - Summer (DST): UTC-4 (EDT)
- ZIP codes: 33040-33041 (Key West)
- Area code: 305
- FIPS code: 12-68800
- GNIS feature ID: 2402897

Stock Island is a census-designated place (CDP) and unincorporated community on the island of the same name in Monroe County, Florida, United States. The population of the CDP was 4,722 at the 2020 census, up from 3,919 in 2010. It is located on the portion of the island south of US 1. It is supposedly named for the herds of livestock formerly kept there. Alternatively, some local historians suggest that it may be named for an early settler.

== Geography ==
US 1 (or the Overseas Highway) crosses the key at approximately mile markers 4–6, immediately east of Key West.

According to the United States Census Bureau, the CDP has a total area of 2.1 square miles (5.4 km^{2}), of which 0.8 square miles (2.1 km^{2}) are land and 1.3 square miles (3.4 km^{2}), or 60.24%, are water.

== Demographics ==
Historical population
Census	Pop.	Note	%±
1980	4,446		—
1990	3,613		−18.7%
2000	4,410		22.1%
2010	3,919		−11.1%
2020	4,722		20.5%
U.S. Decennial Census

=== 2020 census ===
As of the 2020 census, Stock Island had a population of 4,722. The median age was 38.4 years. 22.3% of residents were under the age of 18 and 14.4% were 65 years of age or older. For every 100 females, there were 104.6 males, and for every 100 females age 18 and over, there were 104.7 males.

Stock Island racial composition
Race	Number	Percentage
White (non-Hispanic)	1,662	35.2%
Black or African American (non-Hispanic)	895	18.95%
Native American	7	0.15%
Asian	29	0.61%
Other/Mixed	113	2.39%
Hispanic or Latino	2,016	42.69%

100.0% of residents lived in urban areas, while 0.0% lived in rural areas.

There were 1,730 households in Stock Island, of which 36.5% had children under the age of 18 living in them. Of all households, 40.9% were married-couple households, 23.4% were households with a male householder and no spouse or partner present, and 25.6% were households with a female householder and no spouse or partner present. About 22.6% of all households were made up of individuals, and 7.5% had someone living alone who was 65 years of age or older.

There were 1,942 housing units, of which 10.9% were vacant. The homeowner vacancy rate was 0.7% and the rental vacancy rate was 5.1%.

=== 2000 census ===
As of the census of 2000, there were 4,410 people, 1,713 households, and 1,050 families residing in the CDP. The population density was 1,891.9/km^{2} (4,919.1/mi^{2}). There were 1,855 housing units at an average density of 795.8/km^{2} (2,069.2/mi^{2}). The racial makeup of the CDP was 79.95% White, 10.45% African American, 0.36% Native American, 1.09% Asian, 0.05% Pacific Islander, 4.76% from other races, and 3.33% from two or more races. Hispanic or Latino residents of any race were 43.33% of the population.

There were 1,713 households, out of which 29.6% had children under the age of 18 living with them, 39.5% were married couples living together, 15.4% had a female householder with no husband present, and 38.7% were non-families. 26.0% of all households were made up of individuals, and 5.4% had someone living alone who was 65 years of age or older. The average household size was 2.57 and the average family size was 3.12.

In the CDP, 23.5% of the population was under the age of 18, 8.3% was from 18 to 24, 33.2% from 25 to 44, 26.5% from 45 to 64, and 8.5% was 65 years of age or older. The median age was 37 years. For every 100 females, there were 118.6 males. For every 100 females age 18 and over, there were 118.8 males.

The median income for a household in the CDP was $31,537, and the median income for a family was $38,029. Males had a median income of $23,714 versus $20,182 for females. The per capita income for the CDP was $14,346. About 19.2% of families and 20.5% of the population were below the poverty line, including 28.9% of those under age 18 and 16.2% of those age 65 or over.

== Education ==
Monroe County School District operates public schools serving Stock Island. Three schools in the City of Key West, Gerald Adams on Stock Island and Horace O'Bryant Middle School and Key West High School, located on Key West Island, serve Stock Island. College of the Florida Keys is located here as well.

== About the community ==
The community tends to be residential in character, rather than the tourist-oriented Key West, with a year-round population.

I Love Stock Island runs a three-day festival in December featuring a lighted boat parade, tours of the island, and culinary contests. They also promote the artist and business community and organize quarterly island-wide clean up days.

The Key West Golf Club and residential complex, which takes up nearly one-quarter of the island is on the City of Key West side.
