= Key West Library =

Coordinates: 24.5575°N 81.8000°W

The Key West Library, also known as the Monroe County May Hill Russell Library, is main branch of the Monroe County Library System and is based in Key West, Florida. There are five branches that make up the Monroe County Library System and the Key West Library has been part of Key West island life for more than 50 years. The Key West Library is the southernmost branch of the Monroe County Public Library and is one of the oldest libraries in the state of Florida. The Key West Library serves more than a quarter of a million visitors annually. The Branch Manager for the Key West Branch is Kim Rinaldi.

== History ==
In 1892, a group of citizens organized the Key West Library Association, opening South Florida's first formal public library in the old Masonic Temple, located between Simonton and Caroline Streets. This location, destroyed by a hurricane in 1919, housed 1,200 volumes donated by the Key West Library Association. This, however, was not Key West’s first library. According to historian Tom Hambright, a local 1858 diary entry mentions paying $5 a year in library dues, but that is the only record of a library prior to 1892. After 1896, the operation was assumed by other civic groups, including the Key West Women's Club. The Key West Women’s Club, founded in 1915, provided library service for 44 years. Funds were raised through the group's efforts to build a permanent location for the library. The building, located at 700 Fleming Street, opened its doors to the public in November 1959 and lent approximately 230 books on its first day.

Before 1950, the only archives of Key West history were government records or private collections, but after the Art and Historical Society was formed in 1950, it maintained a small archives to support the museum. With the founding of the Old Island Restoration Foundation in 1960, it became obvious that a larger archives was needed to support the restoration projects. On February 15, 1964, Monroe County Library Director May Hill Russell formed the Historical Research Committee to act as a single body to compile all the historical material for the city and county. May Hill Russell called together a group of volunteers to find and collect material for the new archives. This material, according to Hambright, included writer Ernest Hemingway’s documents, which had been previously stored in the back of Sloppy Joe’s Bar, and collected by Betty Bruce, the wife of Toby Bruce, “Hemingway's ‘right-hand man in Key West.”

The Florida History Collection, as it became known, soon outgrew the two boxes and moved to various spots within the Library until 1975, when the new wings were added and the Florida History Collection had a home with a small vault, now the children’s room. The Florida History Collection continued to grow. In 1993, to meet the need for more security and space, the County Commission added a wing in the rear of the library with a large vault to house the Florida History Collection. Several notable items in the archives include connections to the island’s most famous residents, such as a galley proof of Hemingway’s 1937 novel To Have and Have Not (set in Key West during the Great Depression), Tennessee Williams’ library card, and a 1984 letter from Jimmy Buffett. In addition to the collecting of Tennessee Williams' library card, this library also houses Williams' overdue notices as another notable "souvenir" that he once frequented this particular library. There is an auditorium that was an addition to the building back in the 1970s. This auditorium was named after Tennessee Williams and Williams spoke at the building's dedication.

A corps of volunteers scan, catalog, conserve, and transcribe donated treasures of Keys history. Through the generosity of the community, the collection continues to grow and Keys cultural heritage is being preserved for future generations.

== Library Holdings ==
The Key West Library houses a multimedia collection that includes some 190,000 items, public computers with internet access, remote online services, and has a renowned Florida History Room. Most notably, the library’s online photograph archive contains thousands of images, documenting the history of the Florida Keys and Key West. The Library also offers reading groups, film screenings, children's programs and more. Monthly book sales and seasonal lecture series are sponsored by Friends of the Key West Library.

== Branches ==
- Key West Library
- Big Pine Key Library
- Marathon Library
- Key Largo Library
- Islamorada Library
