= Western Union (disambiguation) =

Western Union is an American financial services and communications company.

Western Union may also refer to:

- Western Union (alliance), the alliance established by the 1948 Treaty of Brussels
- Western Union (film), a 1941 western about the company's early days
- Western Union (schooner), a 1939 historic schooner in Key West, Florida, US
- "Western Union" (song), a 1967 song by the Five Americans
- "Western Union", a song by Bladee, Ecco2k and Thaiboy Digital from the album Trash Island
- The Western Union splice, a method of joining electrical cable
