= Poinciana Place, Florida =

Poinciana Place may refer to:

- Poinciana, Florida, formerly known as Poinciana Place
- Poinciana Plaza, a neighborhood in Key West
