= Truman Annex =

Neighborhood and military installation in Key West, Florida, United States

Coordinates: 24.556023°N 81.806989°W

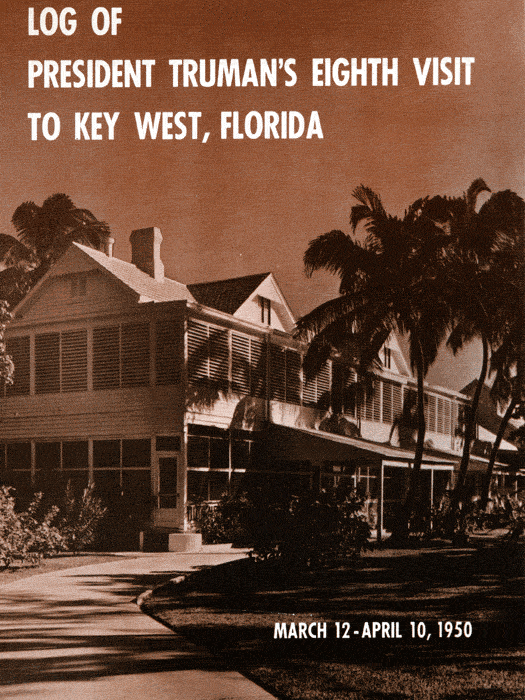
Official log of Harry Truman's March 12 to April 10, 1950 visit to Key West, Florida (from the Truman Library)

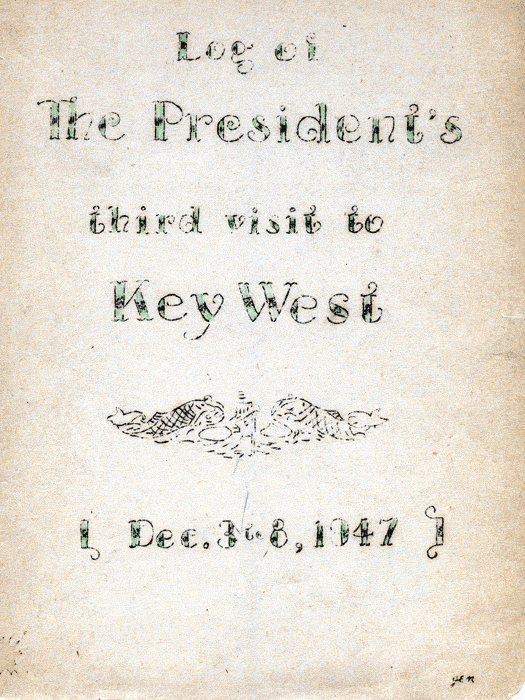
Official log of Harry Truman's December 3–8, 1947 visit to Key West; early logs of his trips were quite primitive (from the Truman Library)

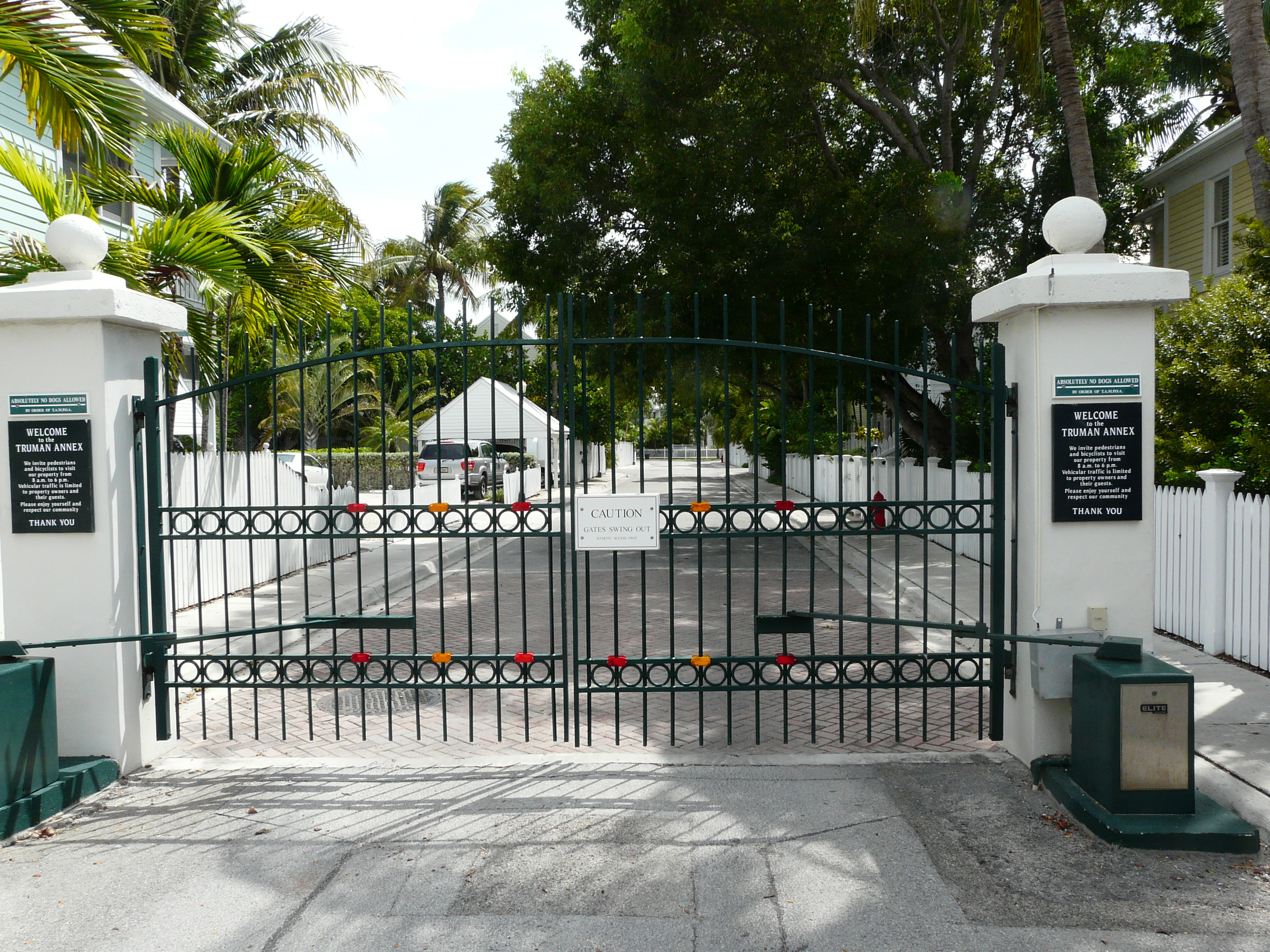
Entrance

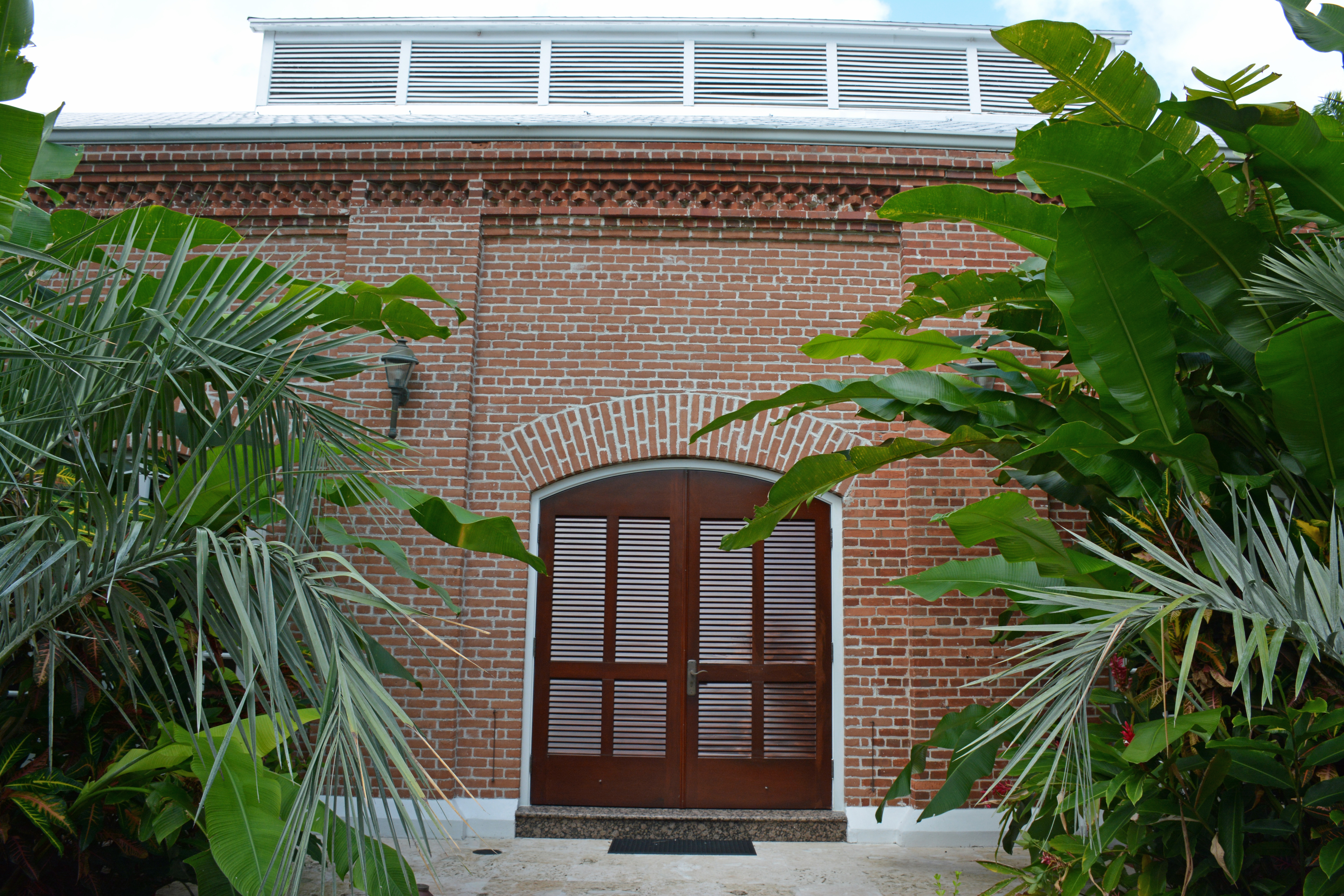
Part of the annex

Truman Annex is both a neighborhood and military installation in Key West, Florida, United States. It is the part of the island that is west of Whitehead Street, with the exception of Bahama Village. The winter White House for President Harry S. Truman was located there, from its days as part of the former Naval Station Key West. The Harry S. Truman Little White House in Key West, Florida was the winter White House for President Truman for 175 days during 11 visits.

Formerly the Truman Annex Naval Station, this award-winning, mixed use redevelopment sits on 45 acres in the heart of the Key West historic district. Between 1973 and 1977 the distressed surplus US Navy property was released to be managed by the Government Services Administration. The City of Key West created the Key West Urban Redevelopment Agency which was for 12 years unsuccessful in developing a master plan for the site.

In 1986, Pritam Singh purchased the 43-acre property from the GSA for $17 million and began the redevelopment initiative considered to be one of the most successful highly-regulated and permitted real estate projects in Florida history. The Singh Company became one of the first private entities in the State of Florida to receive a formal development agreement under the State's Development of Regional Impact legislation.

This complex redevelopment project of over 800,000 square feet was completed in 1996 with 425 classic conch style, single family homes, high end condominiums, a hotel, affordable housing, parks, marina, retail, commercial and museums. The community includes several designated National Register properties and most significantly the Little White House, the former vacation home of President Harry Truman which is now a historic house museum.

The Truman Annex is one of the most lauded and awarded projects in US development history. Awards won include the 1994 Florida Design Arts Award from the Florida Arts Council among others.

== History ==
The annex got its start in 1845 as part of Fort Zachary Taylor, a U.S. Army installation. The base was eventually taken over in 1947 as the "Fort Zachary Taylor Annex" to Naval Station Key West. New docks had been added in 1932 to make it a home base for submarines. The base was mostly decommissioned in 1974 because contemporary nuclear submarines were too large to use the facility. The Navy's primary installation in the area, Naval Air Station Key West, continues to operate about six miles (10 km) east of the annex on Boca Chica Key.

The area around Fort Taylor, as well as the fort itself, is now under the control of the State of Florida as Fort Zachary Taylor State Park. Much of the annex was sold to private developers who have made it a gated residential community (which does not create a barrier to visiting the Truman White House within this area), while 32.4 acres (131,000 m^{2}) were transferred to the City of Key West at no cost to be used for green space and to protect a neighborhood known as "Bahama Village" which is home to many citizens of African-Bahamian descent. The remainder continues to be utilized as a military installation and is known as Naval Air Station Key West - Truman Annex.

Many refugees from the 1980 Mariel boatlift arrived via the Truman Annex. The ship berthing dock and the Outer Mole (Harbor) have been retained by the Navy, which dredges the harbor and collects 40 percent of cruise ship docking fees.

The Annex was renamed the "Truman Annex" after U.S. President Harry S. Truman, who spent his winters in Key West in what is now the annex.
