= Monroe County Public Library (Florida Keys) =

Public library system located in Monroe County, Florida

The Monroe County Public Library System (MCPL) is a public library system located in Monroe County, Florida, which includes the Florida Keys. The system has five branches located in Key Largo, Islamorada, Marathon, Big Pine, and Key West. The Monroe County Public Library system aims to "serve the educational, recreational and informational needs and interests" of the communities of the Florida Keys.

The MCPL is also home to the Florida Keys History Center, located at the Key West Branch, which "is dedicated to the stewardship, knowledge, and understanding of the historic, cultural, and ecological diversity of the Florida Keys. Archival materials include newspapers, maps, images, and genealogy resources." The Florida Keys History Center has over 21,000 images available online. Lead historian Dr. Corey Malcolm publishes a monthly series entitled Island Chronicles about Florida Keys history.

== History ==
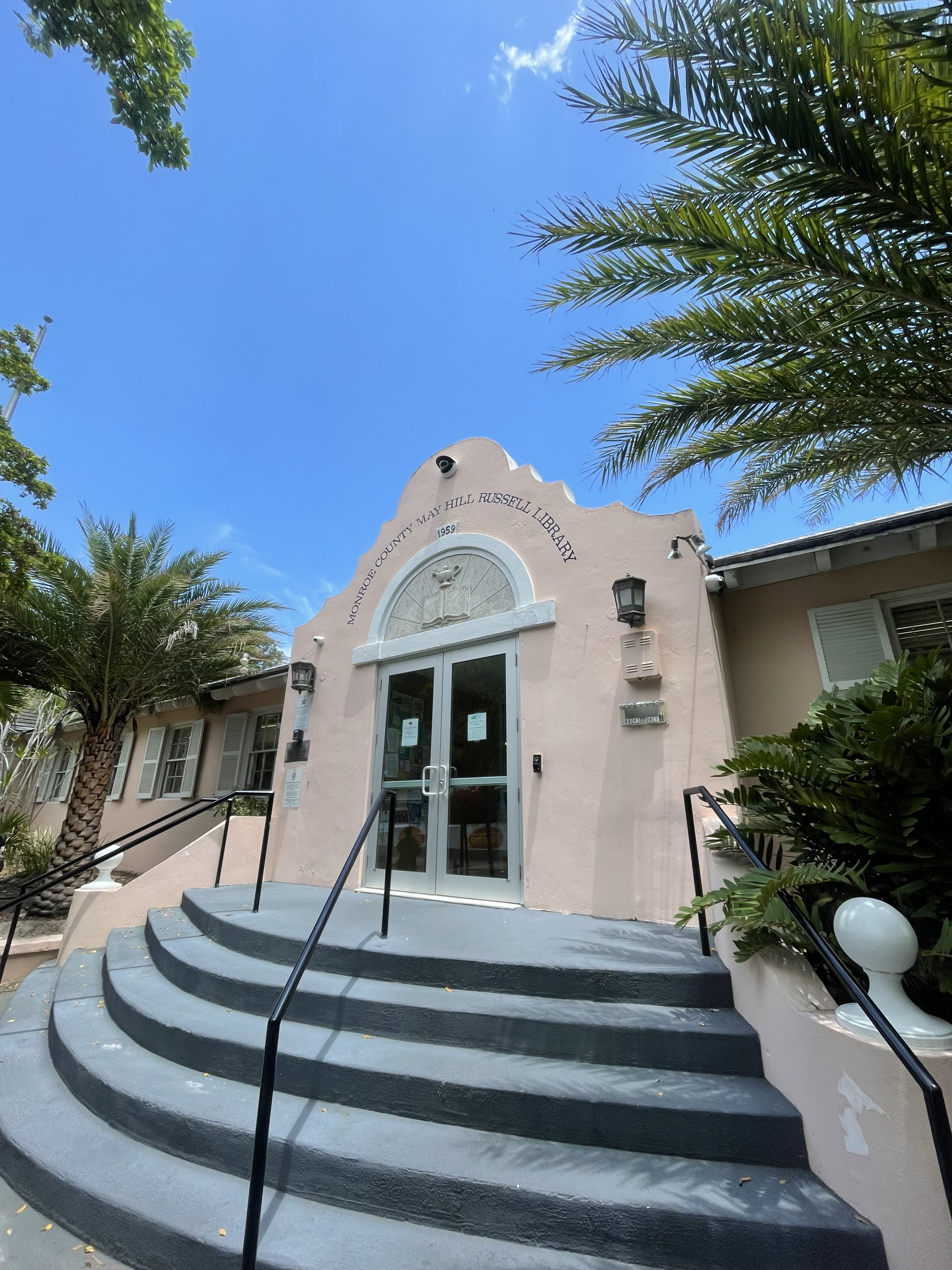
View of the Fleming Street entrance to the Key West Public Library.

In 1892, the Key West Library Association was formally organized on April 8th. This date makes the library system the oldest in South Florida. In September 1892, the library opened in a room on the 2nd floor of Masonic Hall at 315 Simonton Street with 1200 volumes. The library moved to the Albury Building at 417 Duval Street. Then in 1917, it moved across the street to the Sweeting Building at 420 Duval Street. In 1941, the library moved to the Woman’s Club at 319 Duval Street. In 1951, the City of Key West agreed to partially fund library operations. In 1956, Monroe County agreed to add to their assistance. On November 15, 1959, the Key West Library officially opened at its current location at 700 Fleming Street. On that first day, 237 books were checked out.

Prior to the addition of other branch locations, the rest of the Florida Keys was served by bookmobile.

In February 1962, the Marathon Library branch opened in Marathon, Florida. Initially, it was housed in the American Legion; then it moved to a local church site due to incompatibility with the bar. The Key Largo Library branch opened at the Key Largo Civic Club in 1964. In November 1966, The Islamorada Library branch opened in a Red Cross building constructed after the 1935 Labor Day Hurricane. In July 1995, the Big Pine Key Library branch opened in Big Pine Key, Florida.

== Famous Connections ==
Tennessee Williams utilized the Key West Library and "His library card is now part of the historical collection." Tom Hambright, the previous historian for the Florida Keys History Center, noted in an interview that the collection also has Williams's "overdue notice so we know he took out books. And the auditorium in this library that was added in the 1970s, was named for him. And he spoke at the dedication." Williams also "produced the recording featured here for the Monroe County Public Library at the Key West studios of WKWF on April 3, 1971."

Jimmy Buffett utilized the Key West Library during his early career and penned a "letter dated October 22, 1989 [in] support for the Monroe County Library in Key West."

There is a remarkably coincidental connection between Ernest Hemingway and the Monroe County Public Library System. In WWI, Hemingway was injured in Italy, and he was tended to by a nurse named Agnes Von Kurowsky. Hemingway wound up falling in love with Agnes and eventually asked her to marry him. She turned him down and he never quite got over the rejection. She inspired the character Catherine in A Farewell to Arms. Agnes Von Kurowsky (Stanfield) moved to Key West and "got a job working here at the library, in technical processing." One day she asked Betty Bruce about “Ernie,” and Bruce knew something was up. The story came out. One of Hemingway’s great muses was also a Monroe County librarian.

== Branch Libraries and Facilities ==
The Islamorada Library was originally constructed in the aftermath of the 1935 Labor Day Hurricane, with features such as "concrete foundations with concrete walls 12 inches thick and reinforced with rebar" meant to withstand future hurricanes. Two additions were added to the building, one in 1983 and the second in 1999. Library Beach Park is located behind the Islamorada Library branch.

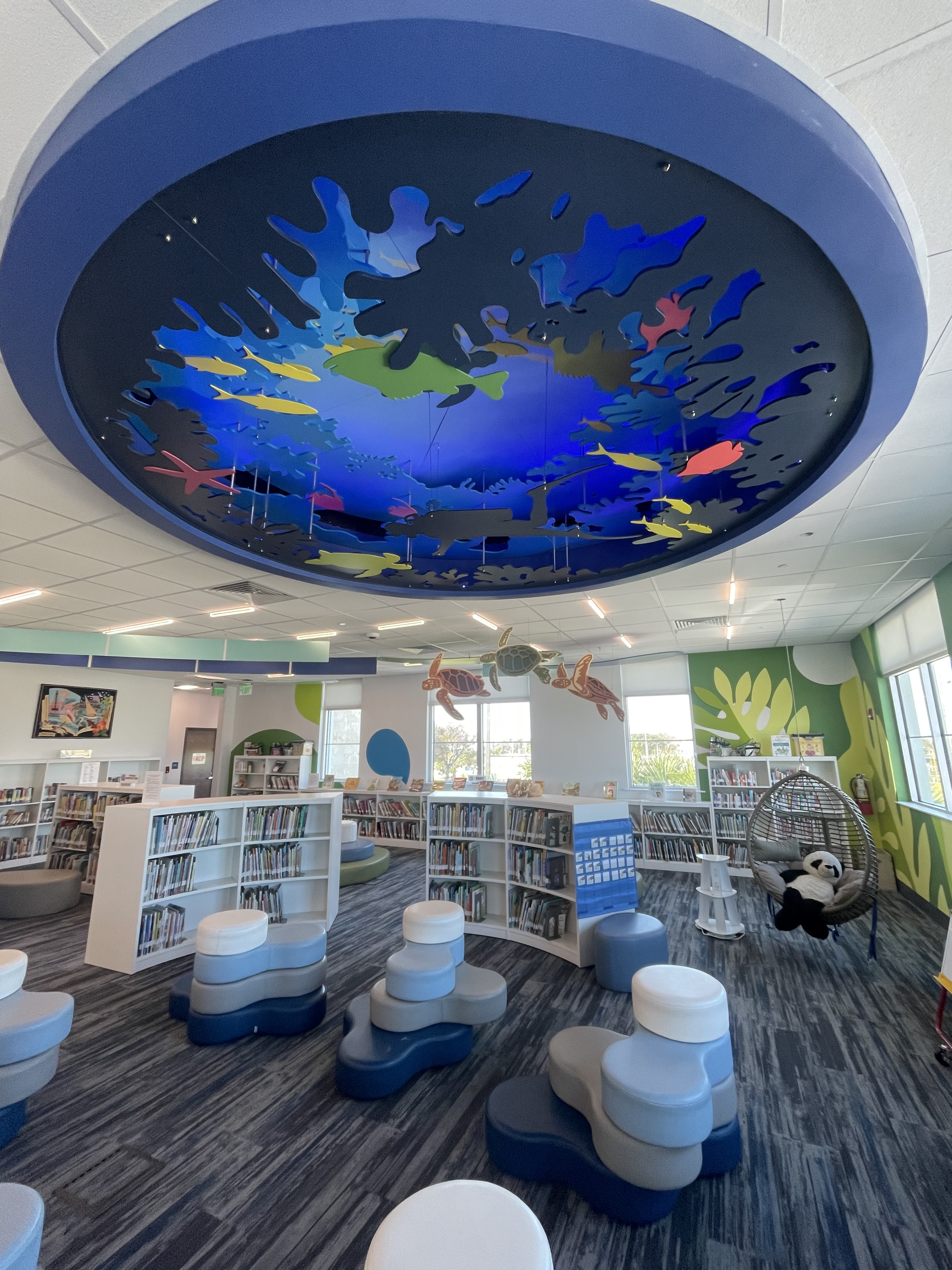
Marathon Library Children's Section Oculus

The new purpose-built Marathon Library building was opened to the public on June 26th, 2021. The building was designed to withstand a Category 5 hurricane and is two feet above sea level. The new building is located on Overseas Highway, across the street from the original branch location.

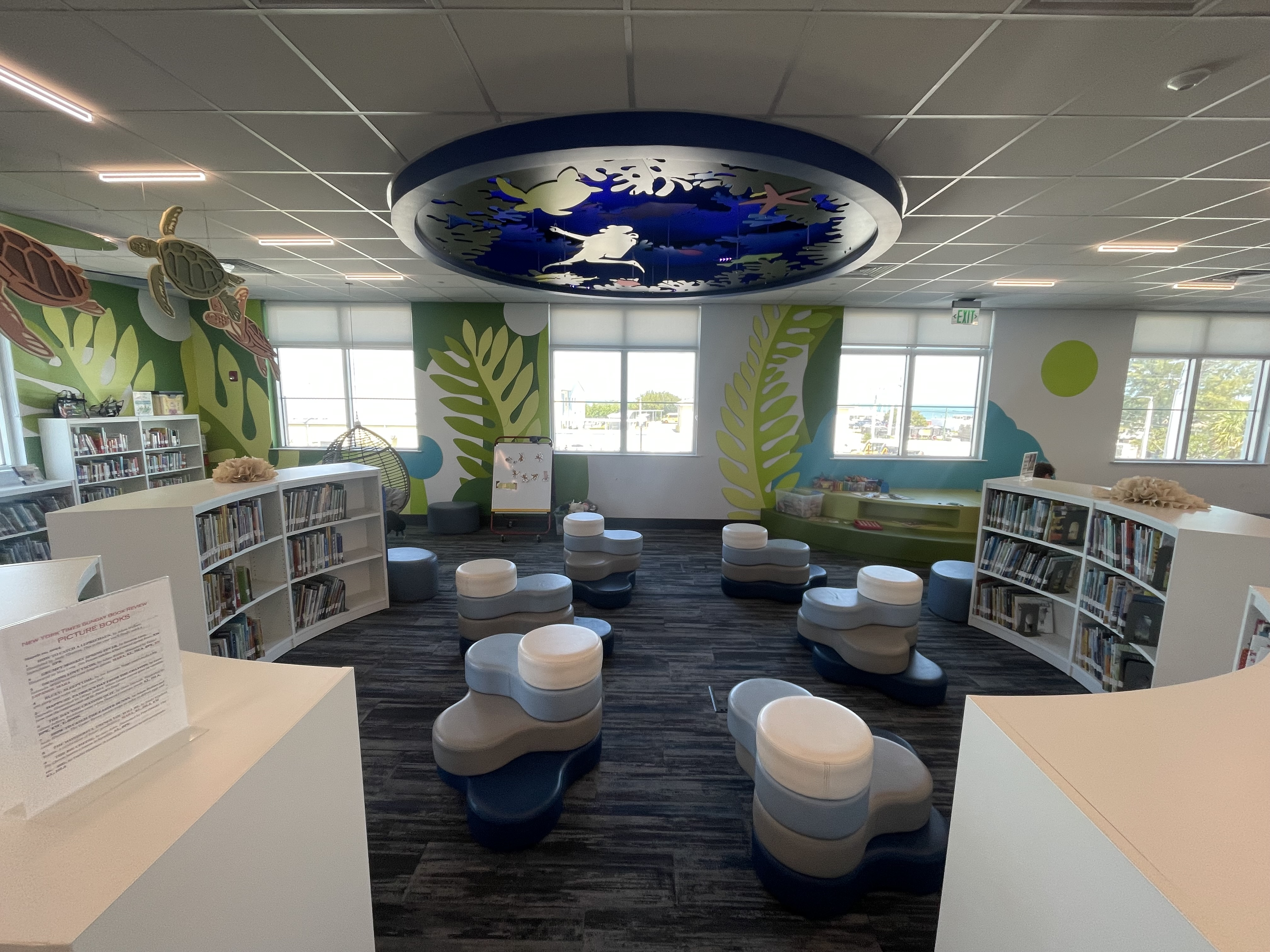
View of the Marathon Library Children's Section bookshelves.

During the move from the original Marathon Library location to the new building, patrons were encouraged to "check out up to 50 books and 25 DVDs from the collection, then return them to the new library building when it opens in early June" 2021. The new Marathon Library building cost $7.5 million to construct, and features "multiple meeting spaces — four small, private conference rooms; a ground floor meeting space that can be sectioned off from the larger space for presentations; an activities center up stairs [...] and a teen center equipped with video games."

In 2022, "the library system installed book-lending machines at Bernstein Park on Stock Island and at the Murray Nelson Government Center in Key Largo." The kiosks are part of a $975,000 federally-funded grant to "bring new technologies and library access throughout the Keys." It is the largest grant the Monroe County Public Library has ever received and was awarded "under the provisions of the American Rescue Plan Act from the Institute of Museum and Library Services."

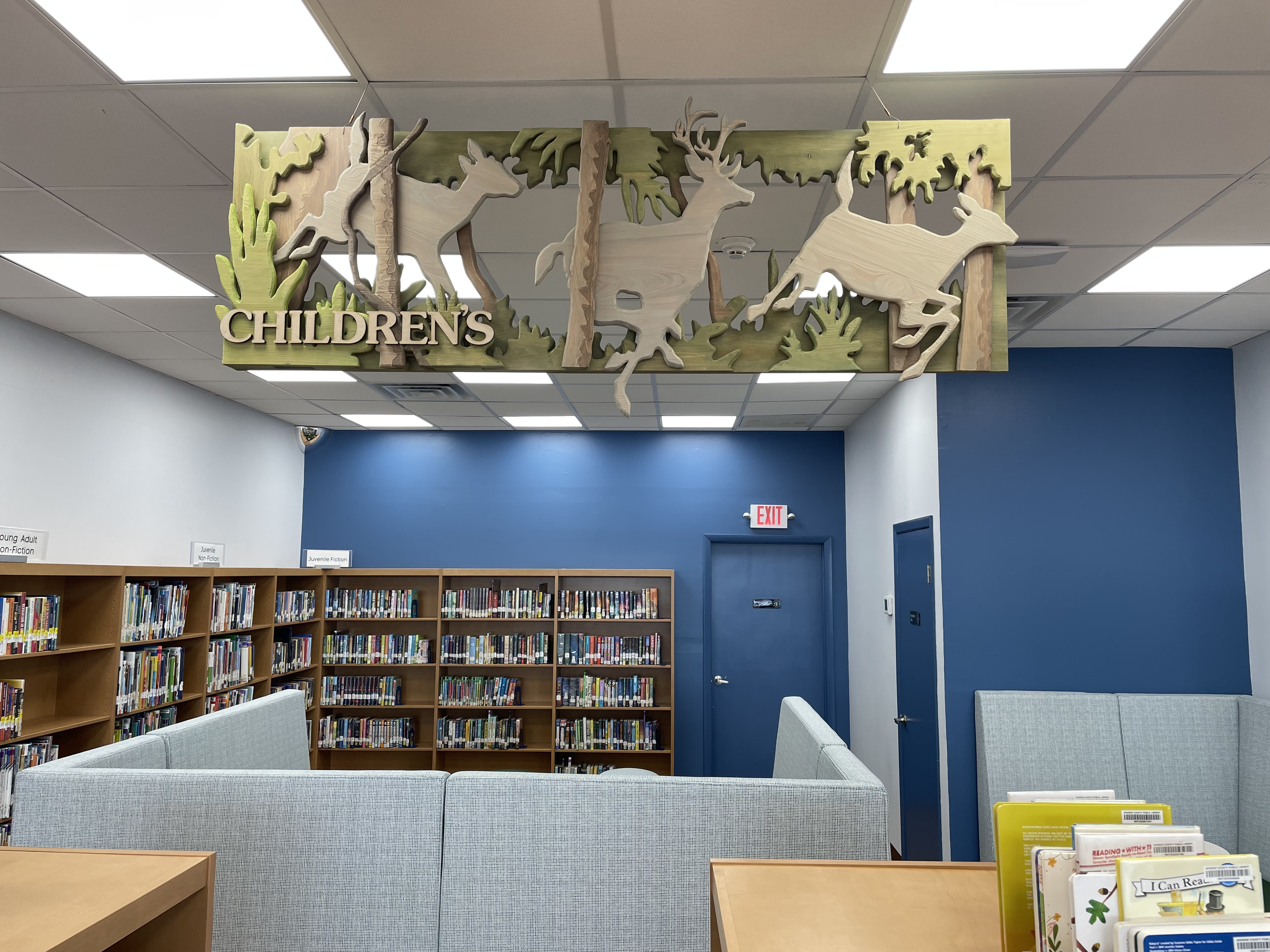
View of the Big Pine Library Children's Section sign.

The Big Pine Library was originally opened in 1995 and underwent its first major refurbishment in 2023. The renovated branch reopened to the public on June 10th, 2023.

== Services ==
The Monroe County Public Library system features five branches that are open to residents and visitors. MCPL offers a variety of books, newspapers and articles, audio-visual resources, in-library online databases, and resources about Florida Keys history, including a large photo collection available online. Digital resources such as ebooks and eaudiobooks can be accessed through Libby. Additional resources include Kanopy, Freegal, Code with Fiero, Libby eMags, Mango Languages, the Florida Electronic Library, and more.

The MCPL branches also provide public internet access via library laptops, free Wi-Fi, and free printing from public computers. In addition, they offer children's events and homework help, various programs, and meeting rooms. Monthly events are listed online.

Library employees offer recommended reading through the weekly Shelf Help column as well as recommended viewing in the Reel Recs column printed in the Keys Weekly newspaper.

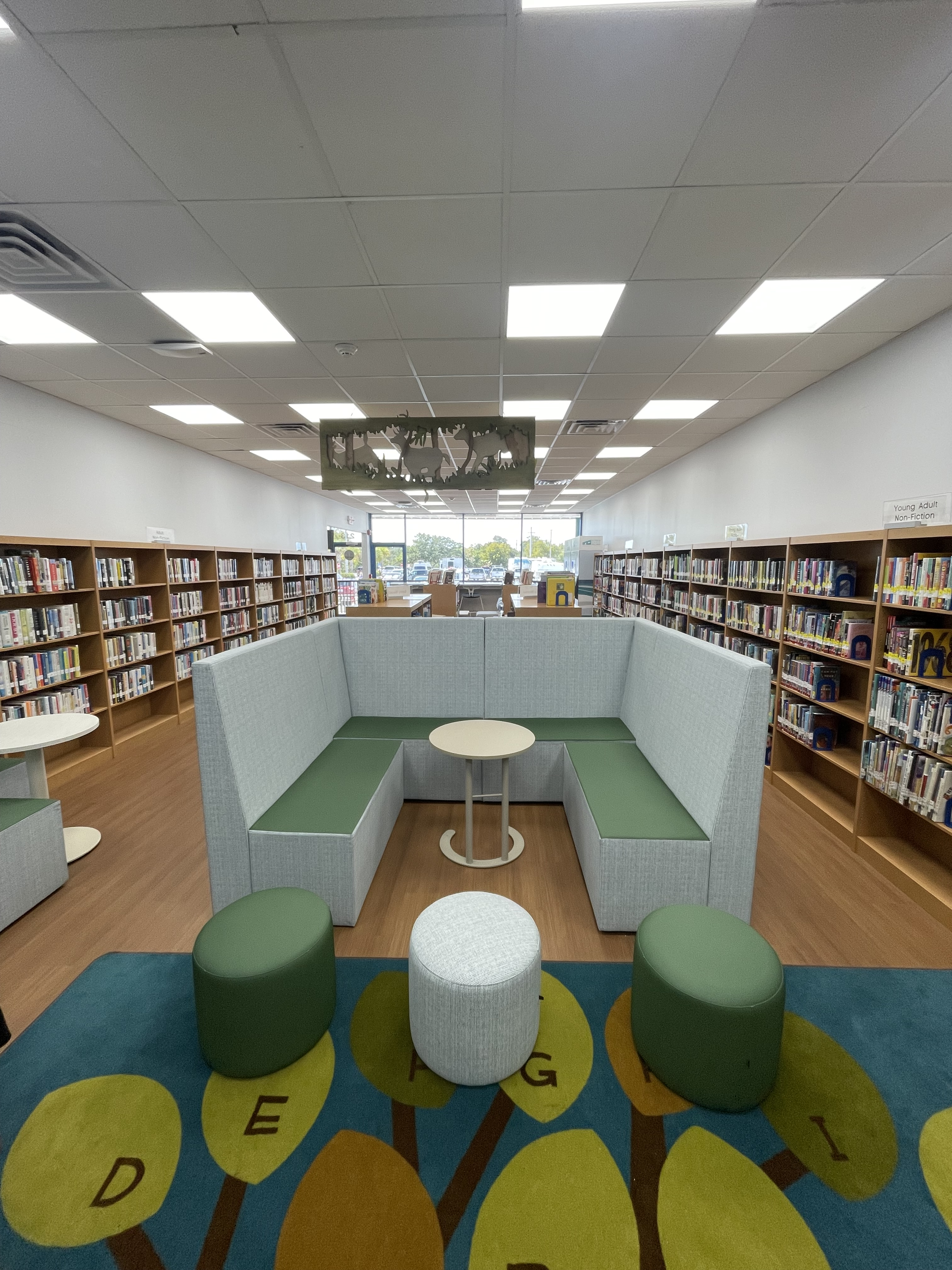
Big Pine Library's Children Section.

Kimberly Matthews is the Library Director.

== Branches ==
- Key Largo Library
- Islamorada Library
- Marathon Library
- Big Pine Library
- Key West Library
