= Key Haven, Florida =

Key Haven
- Unincorporated community
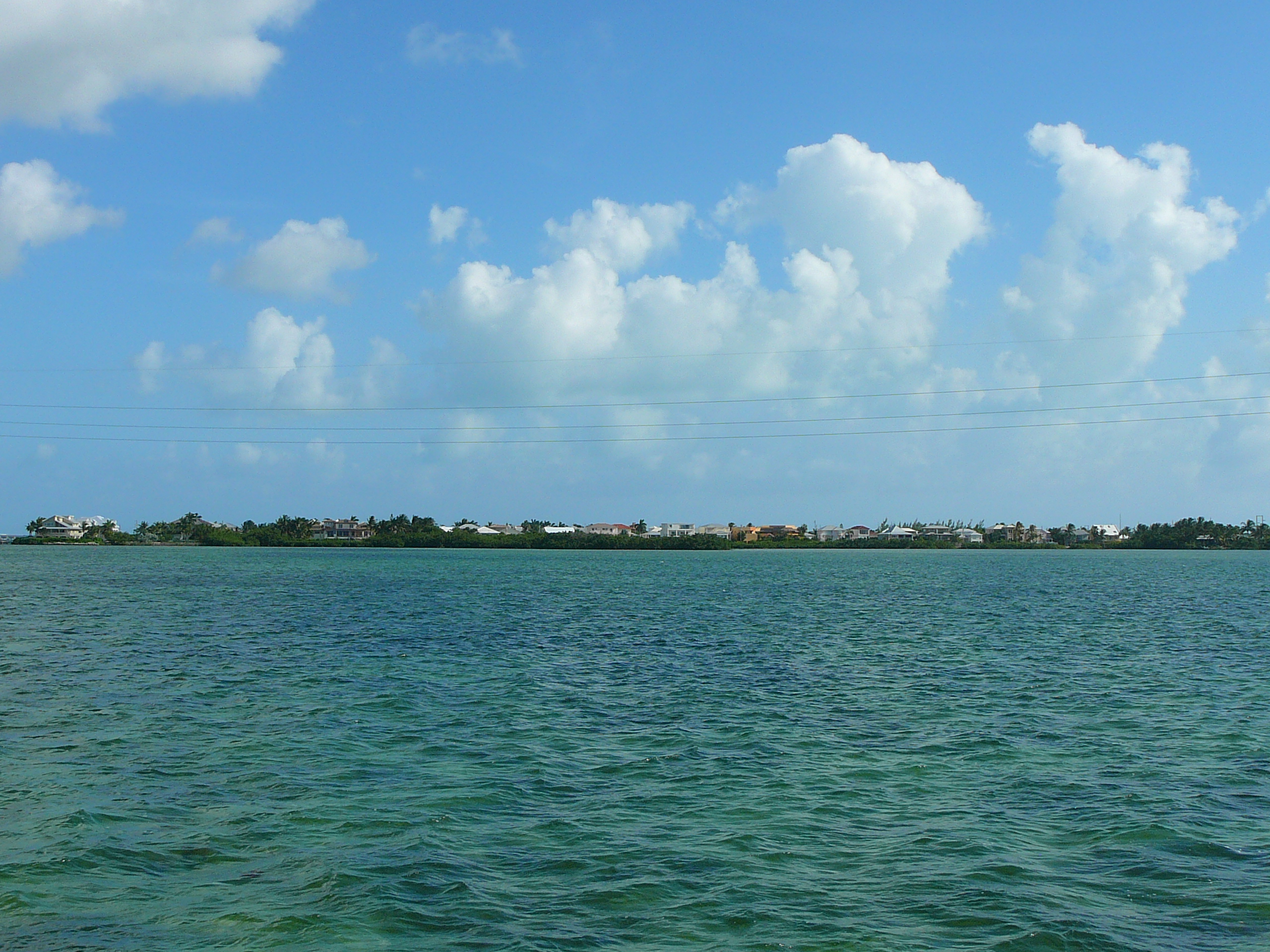
- Key Haven from the north

- Location of Key Haven in Florida Key Haven (the United States)
- Coordinates: 24.582173°N 81.735535°W
- Country: United States
- State: Florida
- County: Monroe

Population
  - Total: ~1,000
- Time zone: UTC−5 (Eastern (EST))
  - Summer (DST): UTC−4 (EDT)
- ZIP Codes: 33040
- Area codes: 305 and 786

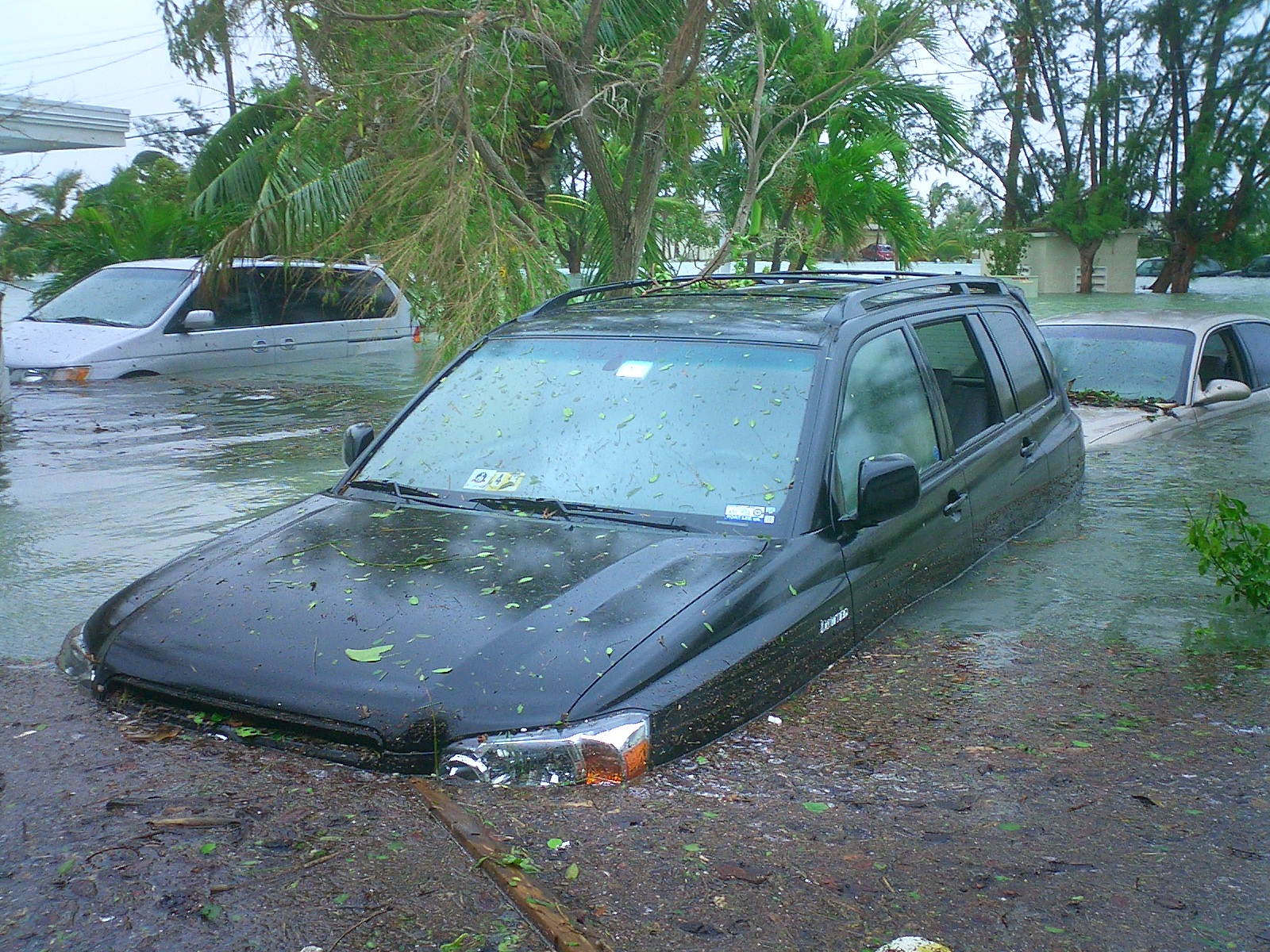
Flooding caused by storm surge from Hurricane Wilma on Key Haven. (October 24, 2005) Photo: Marc Averette

Key Haven is an unincorporated community on Raccoon Key, an island in the lower Florida Keys about a mile (1.6 km) east of the island of Key West. It is a suburb of greater Key West, and houses around a thousand residents. The city limits of Key West on northern Stock Island are separated from Key Haven by a channel about a quarter mile (400 m) wide.

== History and Geology ==
It lies off the northeast side of Stock Island and is connected by fill to U.S. 1 (the Overseas Highway) via Key Haven Road, its primary road, just east of mile marker 5.

Key Haven was chosen as the location of The Real World Key West, which appeared in 2006. The Real World home is located at the end of Driftwood Drive.

The island, being only 2–3 ft (61–91 cm) above the high tide mark, was covered with 4–5 ft (1.2–1.5 m) of seawater from the 8 ft (2.4 m) storm surge of Hurricane Wilma on October 24, 2005. Nearly every car on the island was destroyed, and many homes were damaged.
