= Key West Bight =

Natural harbor and historical site in Key West, Florida

The Key West Bight, now known as the Key West Historic Seaport, is the site of a 200-year-old global maritime trade base in Key West, Florida, USA. A bend in the shoreline on the northwest side of the island created a bight, a wide bay and naturally protected harbor. Today, the Historic Seaport is the location of restaurants, bars, boutiques, art galleries, museums, hotels, boats, and watersports excursions.

== Historical industry ==
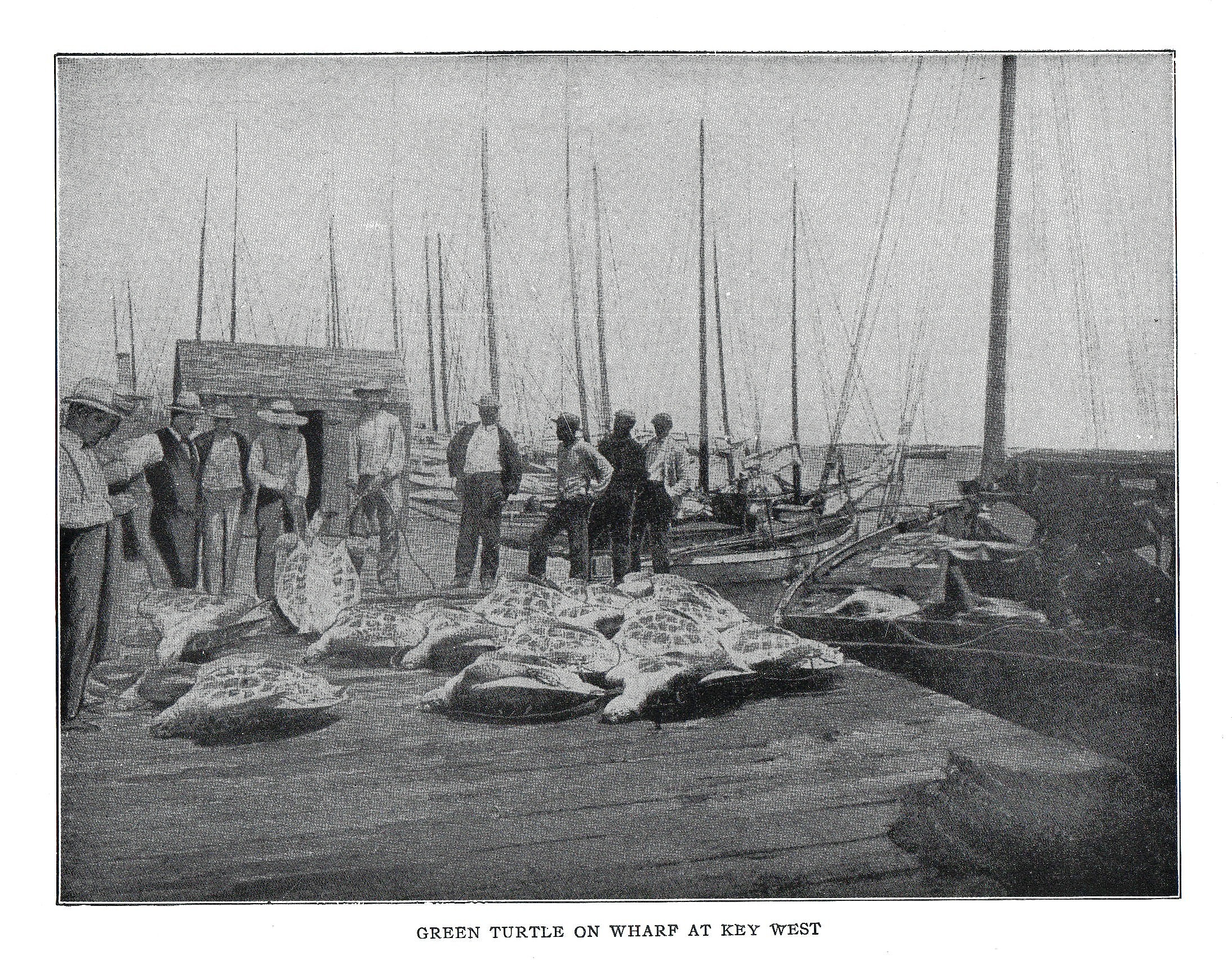
Green turtles being harvested at the Key West Bight.

=== Turtles ===
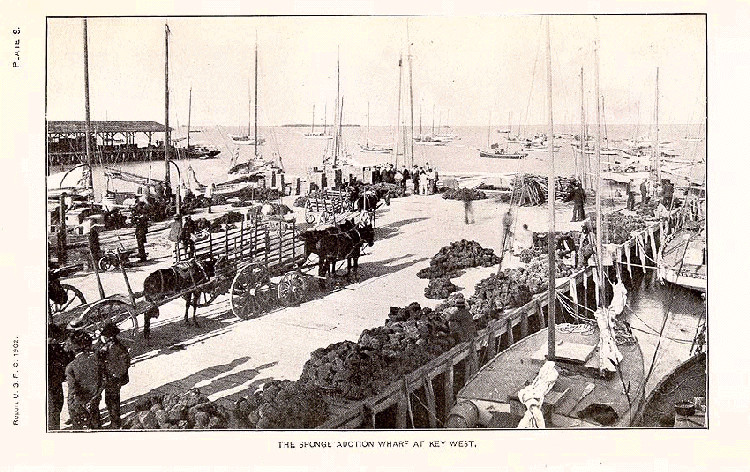
Sponge auction at the Key West Bight.

In the mid to late 1800s, sea turtles were a prized commodity and sea turtle consumption was a substantial industry, with tens of thousands of green turtles harvested from Key West waters every year. Sea turtle meat was used in steaks and soups, their skin was turned to leather, and their shells were used in jewelry. At the bight, turtles were kept live in “kraals,” dockside pens, before being butchered, processed, and canned.

Norberg Thompson, founder of Thompson Enterprises and The Thompson Fish Company, began his operations in the turtle industry. He was an influential Key West businessman who significantly developed the bight. During the Great Depression, Thompson employed 40% of Key West, and he went on to become the town's mayor.

In 1973, the Endangered Species Act put an end to harvesting all green sea turtles.

Today, the bight is home to Turtle Kraals restaurant and the Key West Turtle Cannery Museum.

=== Sponges ===
In 1849, the first sponge shipment arrived in New York from Key West. There was great demand for Key West sponges and the industry created 1,200 jobs on 350 sponge fishing vessels, known as "hook boats", based in the Key West Bight. Business dropped off significantly when local waters became depleted and disappeared altogether with the arrival and popularity of artificial sponges.

The Key West sponging industry was the setting of the 1953 film Beneath the 12 Mile Reef.

=== Shrimp ===
In 1947, Tortugas pink shrimp were discovered in Gulf waters off Key West. Shrimp trawlers were housed at the bight. The lucrative shrimp industry was known as the “Pink Gold Rush” and the shrimps themselves were called “Key West Pinks.” During this time, Booty Singleton's seafood company, Singleton Packing Corporation, took advantage of the availability of shrimps and became a national name. Because of his success in the industry, Singleton became known as the "Shrimp King". Shrimping continued until the late 1980s when the shrimp population was decimated and shrimpers left Key West.

== Historic Seaport today ==
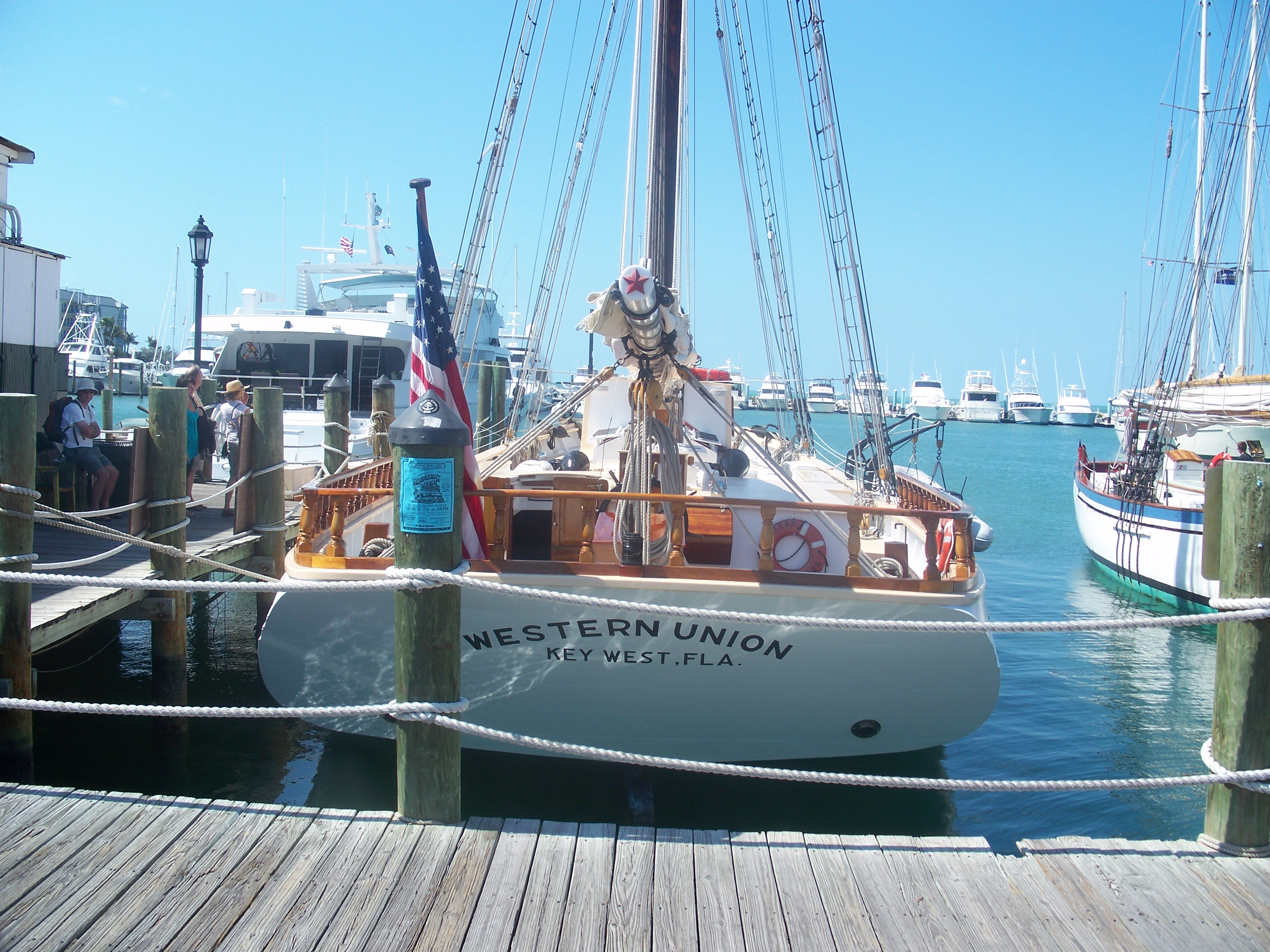
The Western Union berthed at the Key West Bight.

In January 1999, the bight was officially renamed Key West Historic Seaport and Harborwalk.

One vessel found at the Historic Seaport today is the Western Union, a schooner built in 1939 and the last surviving authentic working tall ship from Florida. It is the flagship of the state of Florida and the city of Key West.

The historic seaport is home to a number of large artworks, including by artists Robert Wyland and Ryan Stimers. Businesses at the seaport include The Waterfront Brewery and Cuban Coffee Queen and the bight is the site of sunset cruises.

In 2018, the Key West Historic Seaport was recognized by the Florida Trust for Historic Preservation with the Meritorious Achievement Award for Organizational Achievement.
