= Stock Island =

Island in the Florida Keys

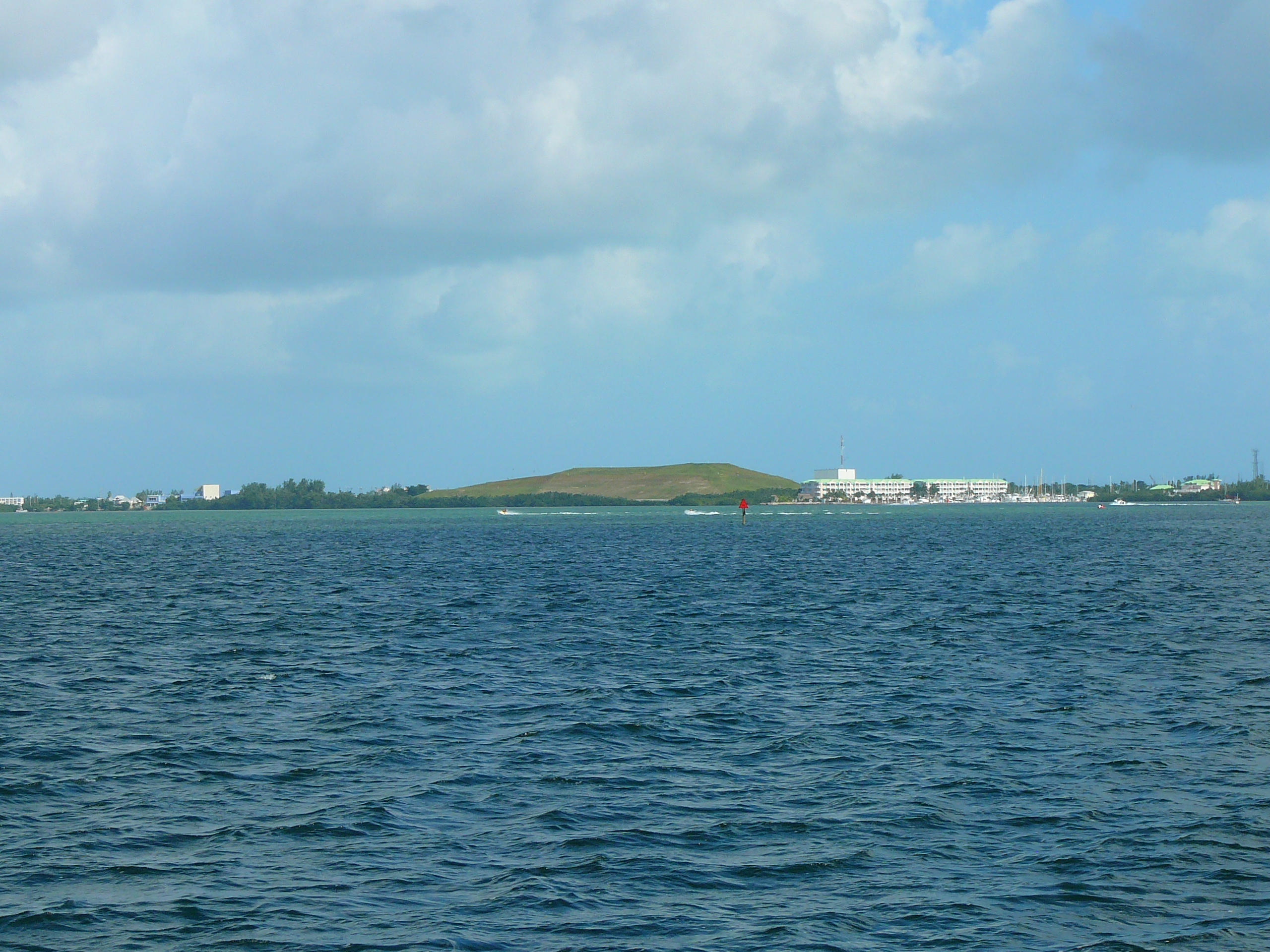
- Stock Island from the north. Florida Keys Community College can be seen to the far left. A large land fill is in the center, and a marina/resort is on the right.

- Stock Island Stock Island (the Caribbean)

Geography
- Location: Gulf of Mexico
- Coordinates: 24°34′12″N 81°44′15″W
- Archipelago: Florida Keys
- Adjacent to: Florida Straits

Administration
- United States
- State: Florida
- County: Monroe

Stock Island is an island in the lower Florida Keys immediately east of Key West (separated from Key West by Cow Key Channel, which is only about 75 yards (70 m) wide). Immediately northwest is Key Haven (official name Raccoon Key), from which it is connected by causeway with US 1 (the Overseas Highway). The part north of U.S. 1 is part of the City of Key West, while the southern part is a census-designated place (CDP) in Monroe County, Florida, United States. The population of the CDP was 4,410 at the 2000 census. Stock Island was supposedly named for herds of livestock formerly kept there. Alternatively, some local historians suggest that it may be named for an early settler.

== Geography ==
Stock Island is located at 24°34′12″N 81°44′15″W (24.570075, −81.737376).

U.S. 1 (or the Overseas Highway) crosses the key near mile markers 4–6, immediately east of Key West.

The northern side of stock island is home to the Key West Golf Course, Monroe County Detention Center, and the main campus of Florida Keys Community College. The southern side of the island is home to numerous mobile homes and marinas. It was the former home of the Islander Drive-In Theater, which was popularized by Jimmy Buffett's hit song "Grapefruit-Juicy Fruit".
