= College of the Florida Keys =

Public college in Key West, Florida, US

The College of the Florida Keys
- Former names: Monroe County Junior College (1965–1968); Florida Keys Junior College (1968–1970); Florida Keys Community College (1970–2019)
- Type: Public college
- Established: 1965; 61 years ago
- Parent institution: Florida College System
- Accreditation: HLC
- Endowment: $6.5 million (2024)
- Budget: $17.6 million (2024)
- President: Jonathan Gueverra
- Faculty: 25 (full-time); 59 (part-time)
- Undergraduates: 920 (fall 2022)
- Location: Key West, Florida, U.S. 24.5823°N 81.7442°W
- Campus: Remote town
- Colors: Blue and orange
- Nickname: Tugas
- Sporting affiliations: NJCAA Region 8
- Website: www.cfk.edu

The College of the Florida Keys (CFK) is a public college in Key West, Florida, United States. It is part of the Florida College System. Its main campus is on Stock Island, adjacent to the only living coral reef in North America. CFK also operates two additional locations in the Florida Keys; one in Marathon and another in Key Largo. With its Key West location, CFK is the southernmost post-secondary school of any type within the contiguous United States. Florida Keys Community College was renamed to the College of the Florida Keys in 2019.

== Academics ==
CFK offers two-year associate degrees in various programs and associate degrees for students planning to transfer to four-year institutions. CFK offers an array of bachelor's and associate degrees, certificates, and career training programs to suit a variety of academic and professional goals. CFK also operates the Tennessee Williams Fine Arts Center, named for the famed playwright who lived in Key West. As of 2011, CFK had graduated over 1,000 nurses.

Among CFK's unique degree programs (based on the needs of the Key West area) are Marine Technology, Marine Environmental Technology, and Diving Business & Technology. The college also offers Licensing programs for professional mariners.

== Gallery ==
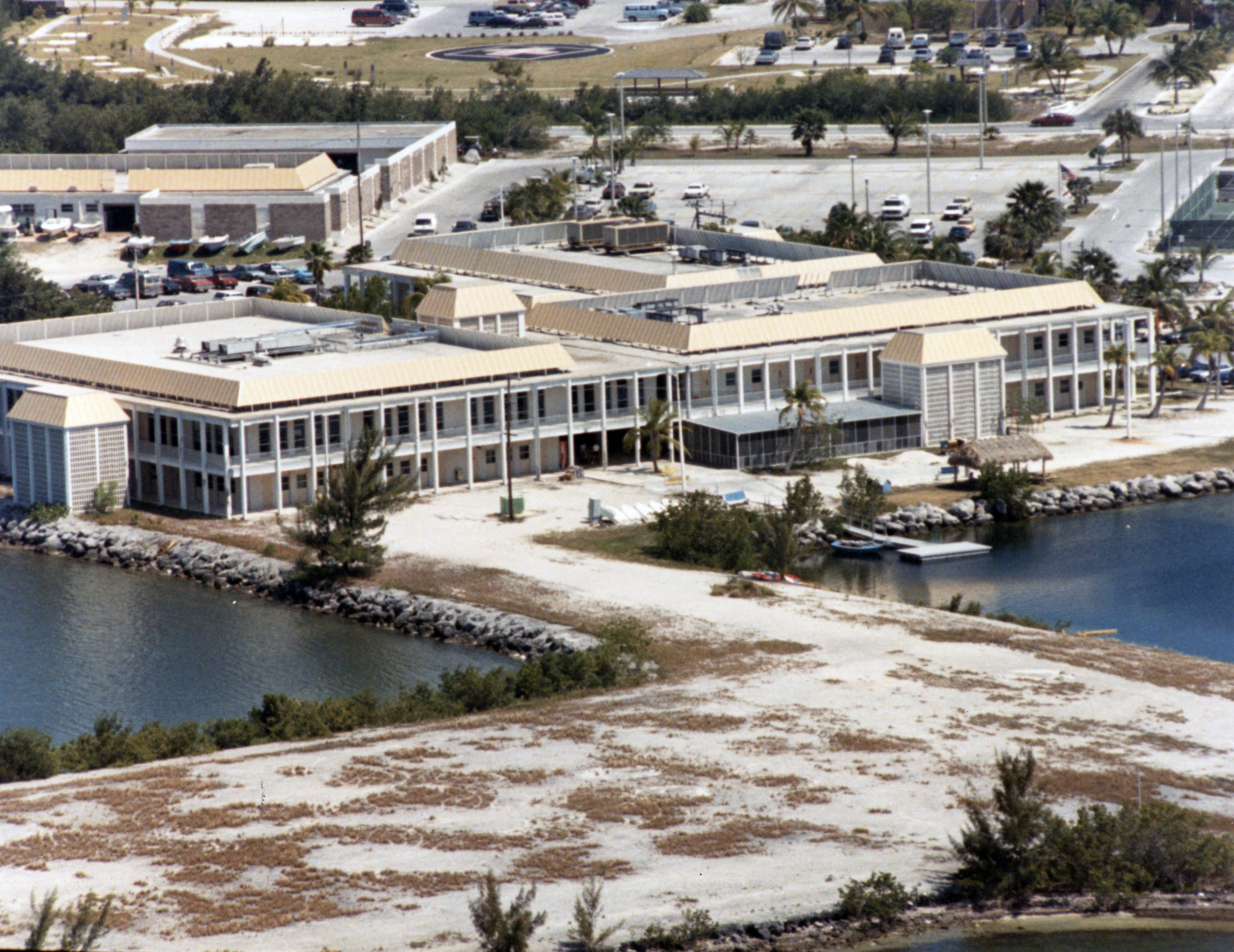
Aerial photograph of campus

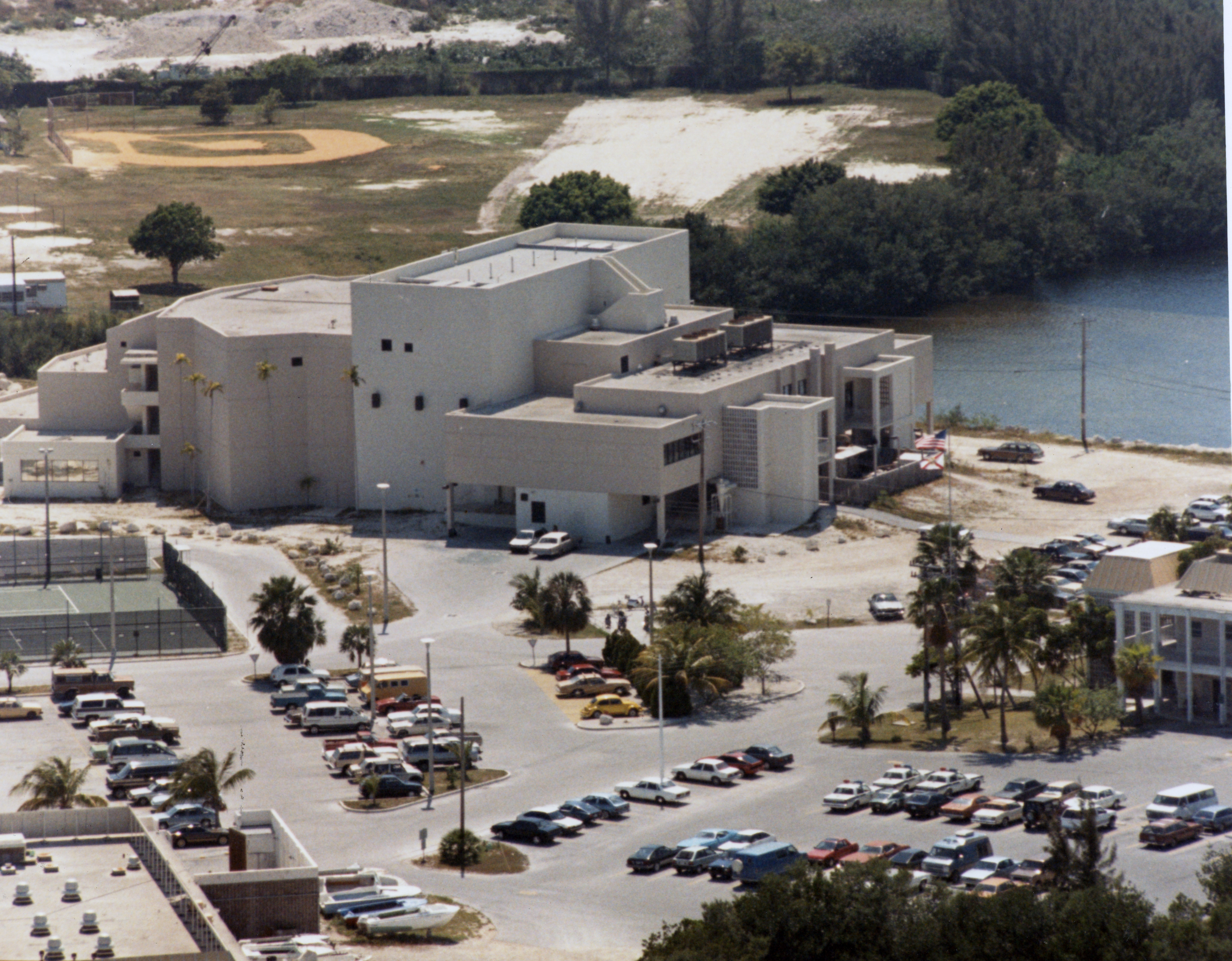
Tennessee Williams Fine Arts Center

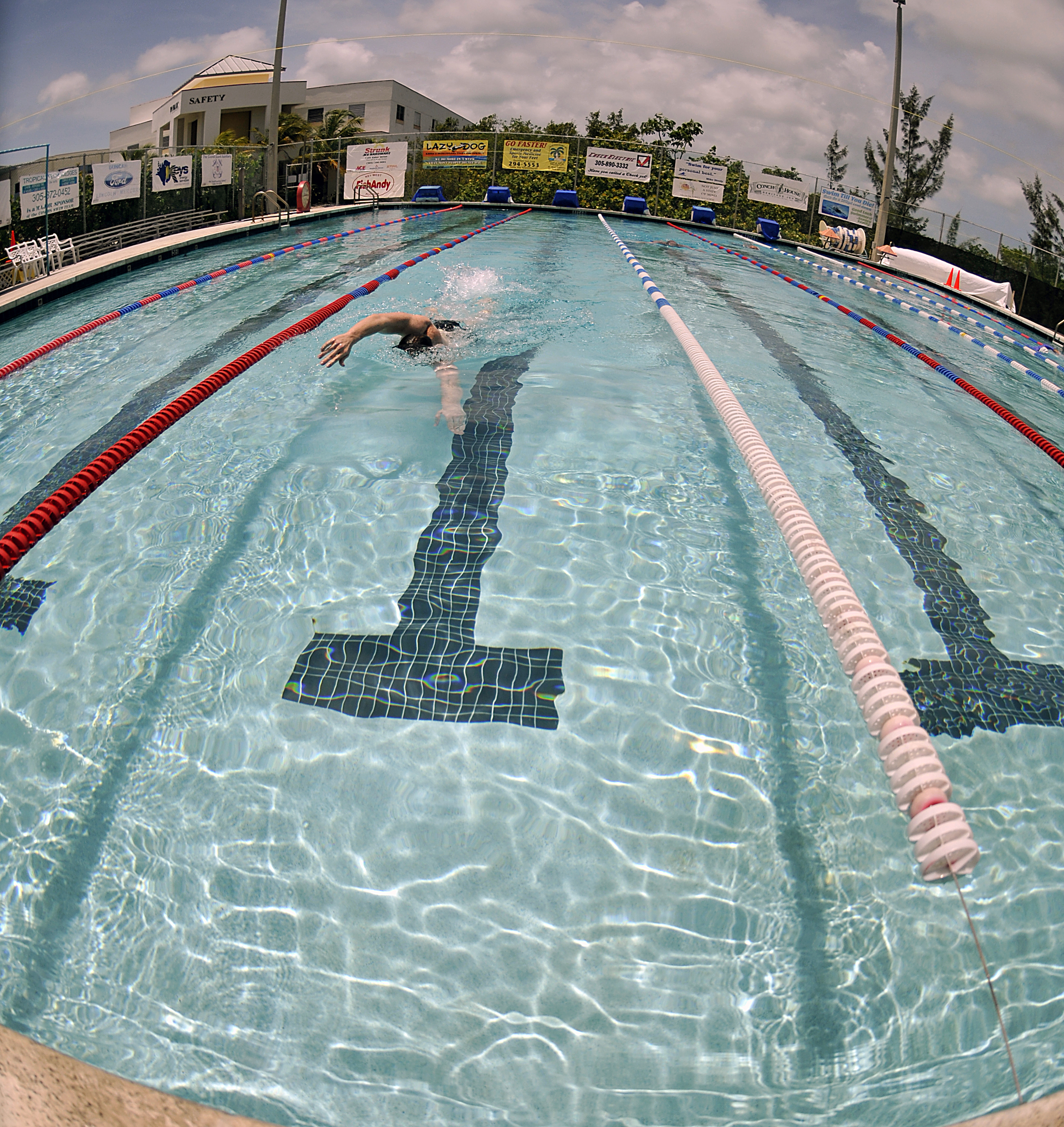
Athletics swimming pool
