= Western Union (schooner) =

American historic schooner

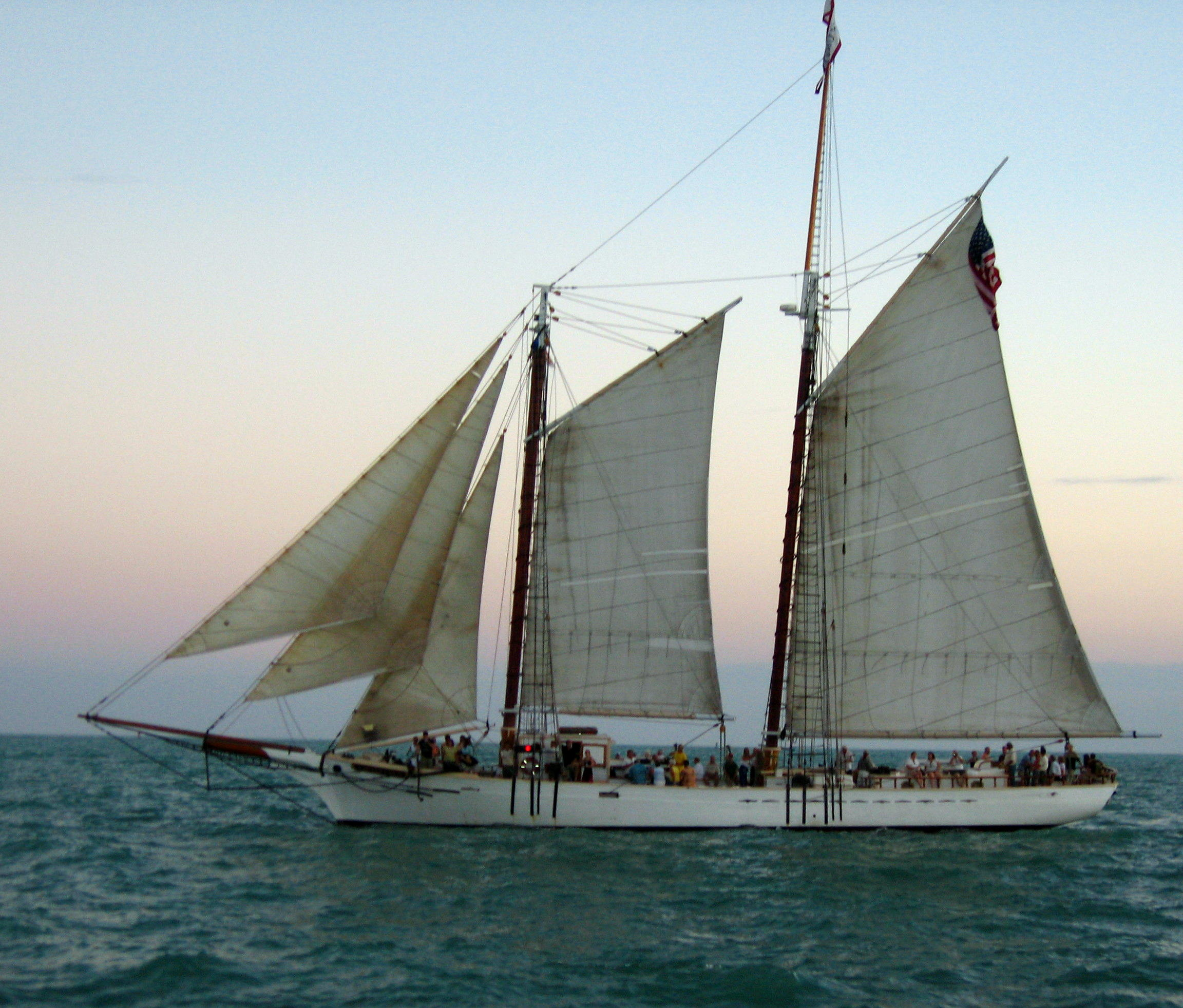

History

United States
- Owner: Western Union Thompson Fish Company; leased by the Western Union Telegraph Company
- Builder: Herbert Elroy Arch, Thompson Enterprises, Key West, FL
- Launched: 1939
- Owner: Vision Quest National, Ltd., Philadelphia
- Acquired: 1984
- Renamed: New Way
- Owner: Schooner Western Union Preservation Society, Key West, FL
- Acquired: 1997
- Renamed: Western Union

General characteristics
- Sail plan: Schooner
- Western Union (schooner)
- U.S. National Register of Historic Places
- Location within Florida
- Location: Key West, Florida, USA
- Coordinates: 24°33′30″N 81°48′27″W
- Built: 1938-39
- NRHP reference No.: 84000930
- Added to NRHP: May 16, 1984

Western Union is a historic schooner located in Key West, Florida, United States. She is berthed at the Key West Bight at 202 William Street. Western Union is the last surviving authentic working tall ship built in Florida. On May 16, 1984, Western Union was added to the US National Register of Historic Places. She was also the official flagship of the State of Florida and the flagship of the city of Key West.

== History ==
Launched in 1939 by Herbert Elroy Arch, Thompson Enterprises, Western Union was built to function as a cable tender in order to maintain the communication link between Florida cities, Caribbean islands and South America. The ship's frame was constructed of Cayman mahogany while all of her planking was Longleaf yellow pine from Florida. Two engines were also installed to maintain her steadiness at sea and to facilitate the cable laying process. Western Union was built to replace another schooner, John W. Atkins, in the servicing of undersea telegraph cables. While she was owned by the Western Union Thompson Fish Company, Western Union was almost immediately leased to the Western Union Telegraph Co. From 1939 to 1974, the schooner was used to check and repair the signal cable from Key West to Cuba, as well as to lay undersea telegraph cable throughout the Caribbean. In all, Western Union laid more than 30,000 miles (48,000 km) of undersea telegraph cable. In 1974 she was converted into a passenger vessel. For the next decade, Western Union carried a large number of passengers, most notably musician Jimmy Buffett.

Western Union was sent to New York City in 1976 to participate in Operation Sail as part of the United States Bicentennial. In honor of the event, Western Union was temporarily renamed La Amistad as a representation of the historical cargo ship La Amistad.

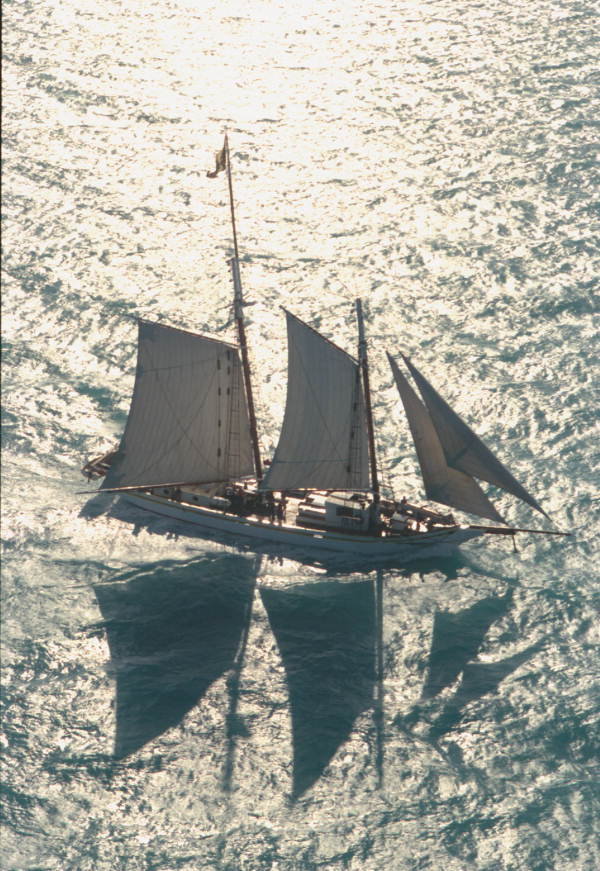
The Western Union returning to Key West in 1985

In 1984 Western Union was sold to the Philadelphia-based non-profit, Vision Quest National, Ltd. and renamed New Way. The vessel was utilized for a program to redirect troubled youth. On May 16, 1984, the ship was added to the National Register of Historic Places. In 1997, she played the role of La Amistad in the 1997 Steven Spielberg film Amistad. The opportunity for the ship to return to Key West came about in 1997 and she was subsequently purchased by Historic Tours of America, Key West. HTA restored her original name, Western Union and ran sunset and day sails as well as charter trips. But in early 2007, HTA announced it had been losing $100,000/year on the charters and put the boat up for sale for $600,000.

Theo Glorie, a local visionary and co-owner of The Coffee Plantation with his wife Diane, decided to try to try to save the ship and keep it in Key West. He founded the Schooner Western Union Preservation Society & Maritime Museum (SWUPS), a non-profit organization dedicated to restoring and preserving the historic schooner for the public as a sailing experience aboard a working, sailing museum to commemorate Florida's seafaring heritage. A group of local community leaders, including Captain Frank Holden, attorney Michael Browning, HTA CEO Chris Belland, Monroe County Commissioner Heather Carruthers, realtor Guy DeBoer (currently editor of the weekly newspaper Konk Life), realtor Ed Anderson, developer Roger Bernstein, Schooner Wharf Bar co-owner Paul Whortington and Bill Semich, President and Editor of Key West Magazine, stepped up and agreed to join the Society's initial board of directors, along with Glorie. Months later in October 2007, HTA donated the historic schooner to SWUPS. The first order of business was to restore the seventy-year-old schooner so she could continue to be certified by the United States Coast Guard to sail with passengers as a sailing, working museum.

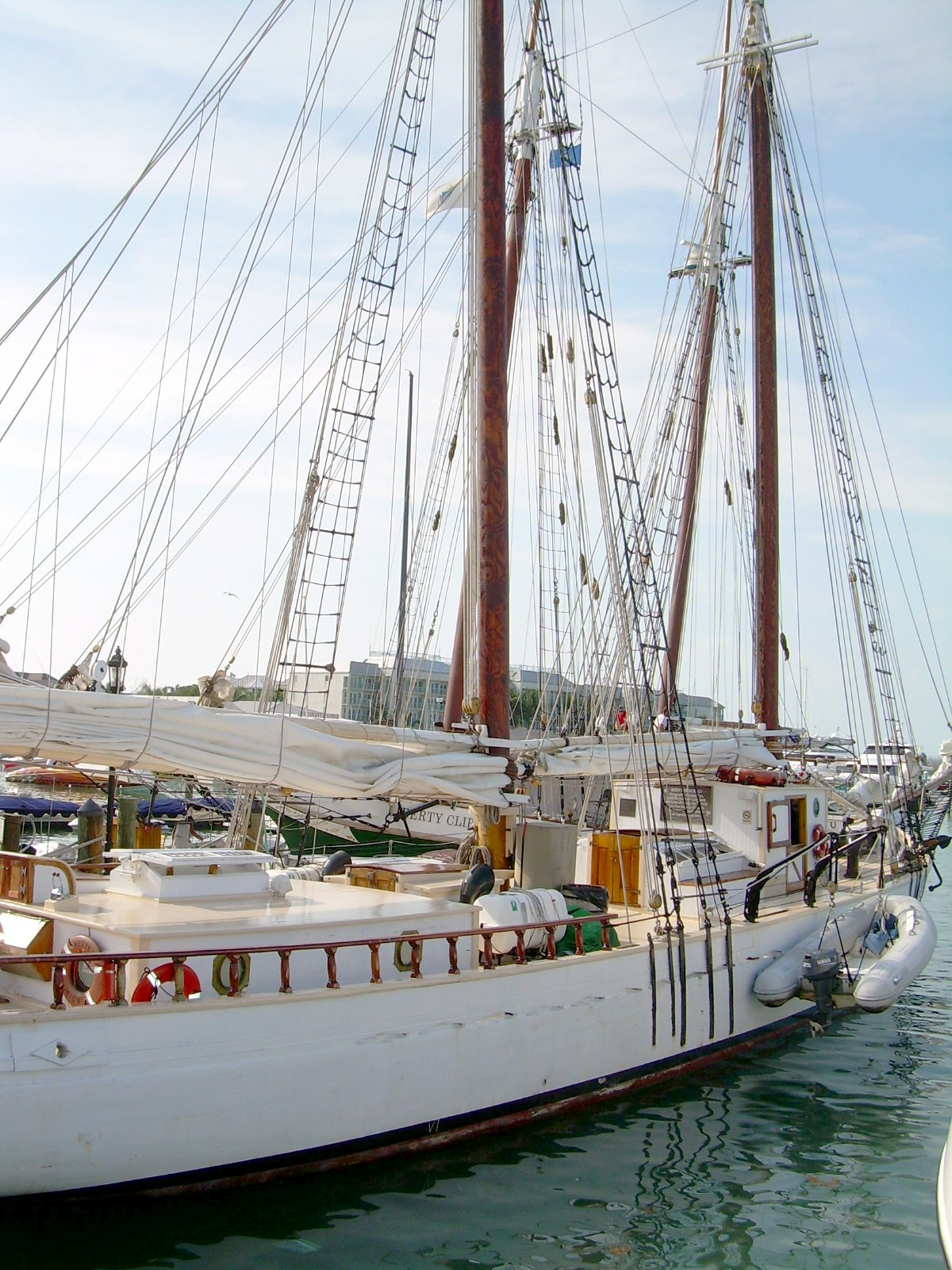
Western Union docked in Key West harbor, 2006.

== Restoration ==
In 2008 a marine surveyor and the United States Coast Guard found that Western Union required a massive restoration in order to continue to sail with passengers. The ship, for her 70 years of age, had never been fully restored.

Because Western Union is on the National Register of Historic Places, the restoration work was accomplished in accordance with the Secretary of the Interior's Standard for Historic Vessel Preservation Projects. Restoration funds were raised by private citizen contributions, the Monroe County Tourist Development Council, and local Key West businesses. The restoration project was overseen by Master Shipwright, Leon Poindexter, owner of Seaport Vessels, LLC. Poindexter and his crew had previous experience by the rebuilding of HMS Surprise used in the movie, Master & Commander: The Far Side of the World.

Following an extensive restoration project, Western Union, the United States Coast Guard approved the final inspection of the ship in 2011, allowing her to resume passenger sailings.

After a failed Coast Guard inspection in 2014, repairs began again on the Western Union.

== Current operations ==
The Western Union was for a time, undergoing repairs in Tarpon Springs, Florida at Marpro Marine Services, LLC. For many years, the ship was docked off of William Street in the Key West Bight (Historic Seaport). In 2019 after the death of chief restorers Bill Barry, Capt. Frank Holden and Richard Manley of Manley deBoer, the vessel was towed back to Key West without her masts, spars, and railings to be stored on the hard at Robbie's Marina on Stock Island, where she still sits today. In addition, the captain who was hired to oversee the restoration in Tarpon Springs was entirely unfamiliar with wooden boats and was ill-equipped for the responsibility.

== See also ==
- List of schooners
