= Carl Tanzler =

German-born American radiology technologist and erotomaniac

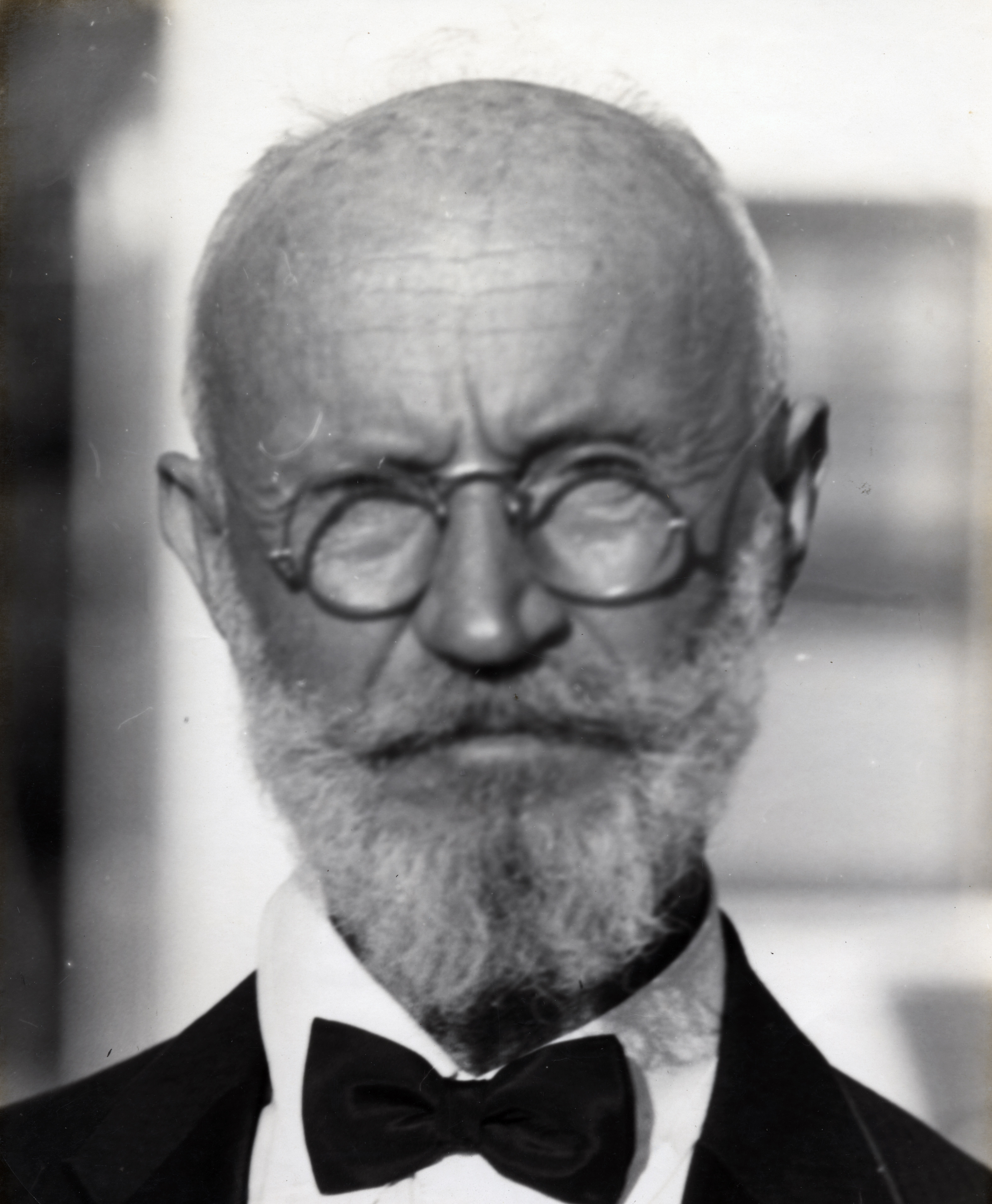
- Tanzler in 1940
- Born: Karl Tänzler or Georg Karl Tänzler; February 8, 1877; Dresden, Kingdom of Saxony, German Empire
- Died: July 1952 (aged 75); Pasco County, Florida, U.S.
- Occupation: Radiology technologist
- Spouse: Doris Tanzler
- Children: 2

Georg Carl Tänzler, also known as Count Carl von Cosel (February 8, 1877 – July, 1952 ), was a German-born American radiology technologist at the Marine-Hospital Service in Key West, Florida, United States. He developed an obsession with a young Cuban-American tuberculosis patient, Elena "Helen" Milagro de Hoyos (July 31, 1909 – October 25, 1931), that carried on well after her death. In 1933, almost two years after her death, Tanzler removed Hoyos' body from its tomb and lived with the corpse at his home for seven years until its discovery by Hoyos' relatives and authorities in 1940.

== Early life ==
He was born as Karl Tänzler or Georg Karl Tänzler on February 8, 1877 in Dresden, Germany.

Tänzler grew up in the German Empire but, at some point, travelled to India and later to Australia just before the outbreak of World War I. During his stay in Australia, over the course of World War I, Tänzler was kept with other Germans in Australia in internment camps and prisons, supposedly for his own protection and safety because of his German ethnicity. He attempted and failed to escape by constructing a ship vessel. He was released shortly after the end of World War I, but since he was not allowed to move back to his native Germany, he instead left for the Netherlands. In "The Trial Bay Organ: A Product of Wit and Ingenuity" by "Carl von Cosel", an autobiographical account in the Rosicrucian Digest of March and April 1939, he gives details about his stay in Australia before his internment during the Great War, as well as his subsequent return to Germany after the War:

Many years ago, Carl von Cosel travelled from India to Australia with the intention of proceeding to the South Seas Islands. He paused in Australia to collect equipment and suitable boats, and to become acquainted with prevailing weather and sea conditions. However, he became interested in engineering and electrical work there, bought property, boats, an organ, an island in the Pacific—so that he was still in Australia at the end of ten years. He had just begun to build a trans-ocean flyer when the war broke out and the British military authorities placed him in a concentration camp for 'safe-keeping' along with many officers India and China who were prisoners of war. Later he was removed to Trial Bay to a castle-like prison on the cliffs, and there the work in this narrative was accomplished. At the end of the war no prisoner was permitted to return to his former residence, but all were shipped to the prisoner's exchange in Holland. When Carl von Cosel was released he set out to find his mother from whom he had not heard since the beginning of the war. Finding her safe, he remained with her for three years, witnessing the chaos that followed in the wake of the war. ... Finally, she suggested that her son return to his sister in the United States ...

Tanzler's account of Trial Bay Gaol, his secret building of a sailboat, etc., is confirmed by Nyanatiloka Mahathera, who mentions that he planned to escape from the Gaol with "Count Carl von Cosel" in a sailboat, and provides other information about the internment of Germans in Australia during World War I.

Around 1920, following his return to Germany, Tanzler married Doris Schäfer (1889–1977). Together they had two children: Ayesha Tanzler (1922–1998), and Clarista Tanzler (1924–1934), who died of diphtheria.

Tanzler emigrated to the United States from Germany in 1926, sailing from Rotterdam on February 6, 1926 to Havana, Cuba. From Cuba, he settled in Zephyrhills, Florida, where his sister had already emigrated, and was later joined by his wife and daughters. Leaving his family behind in Zephyrhills in 1927, he took a job as a radiology technician at the U.S. Marine Hospital in Key West, Florida under the name Carl von Cosel.

During his childhood in Germany, and later while traveling briefly in Genoa, Italy, Tanzler claimed to have been visited by visions of a dead, purported ancestor, Countess Anna Constantia von Cosel (1680–1765), who revealed the face of his true love, an exotic dark-haired woman, to him. He was convinced these "visions" were messages from Anna Constantia von Brockdorff from the dead. He was infatuated with her physical appearance, dark hair, and beauty. Because Anna Constantia von Brockdorff was also known as "the Countess of Cozel", he adopted the name Karl Tänzler von Cosel, which he preferred to be called by.

== Maria Elena Milagro de Hoyos ==
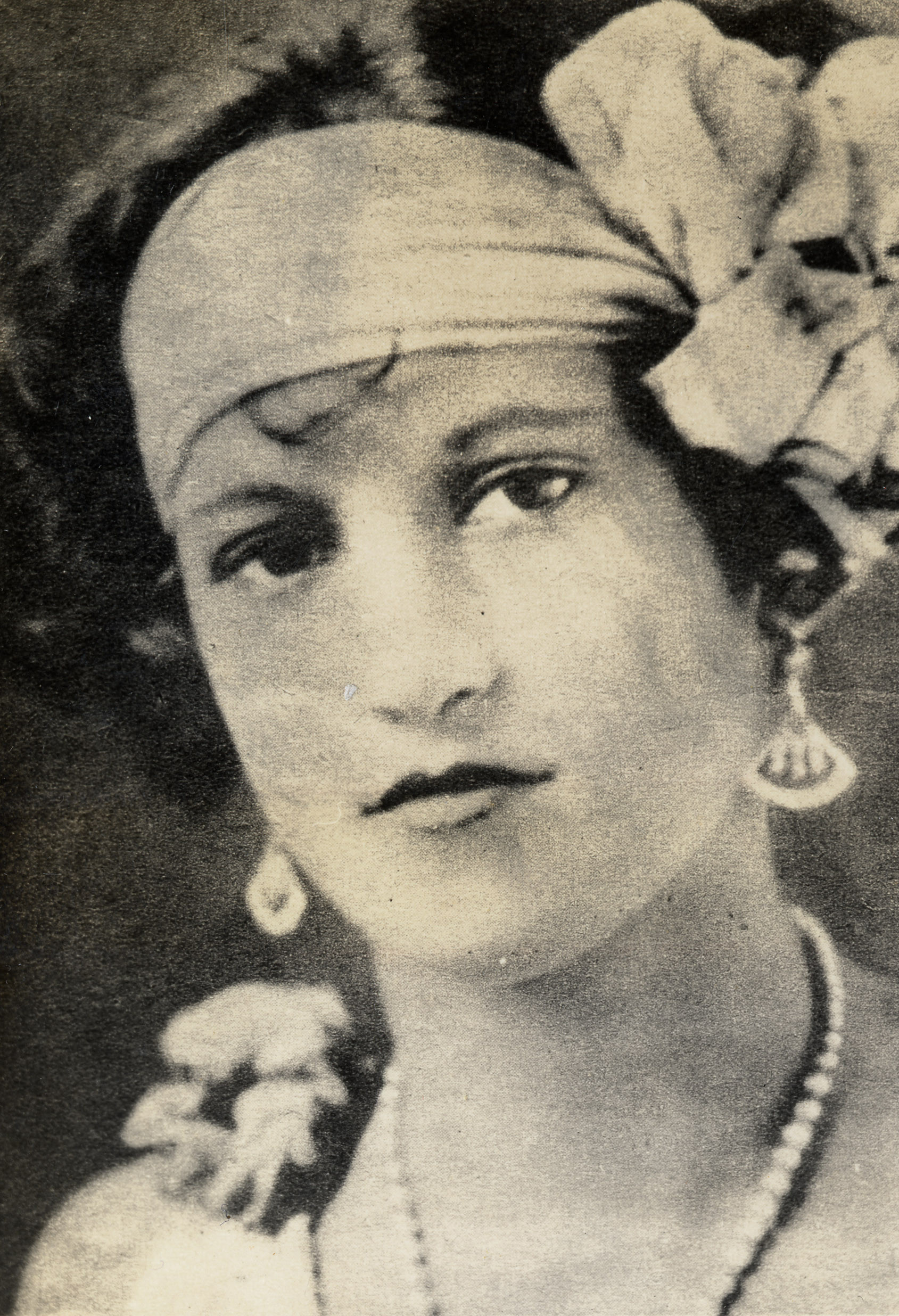
Elena Milagro Hoyos

On April 22, 1930, while working at the Marine Hospital in Key West, Tanzler met Maria Elena Milagro de Hoyos (1909–1931), a local Cuban-American woman who had been brought to the hospital by her mother for an examination. Tanzler immediately believed her to be the beautiful dark-haired woman revealed to him in his earlier "visions." By all accounts, Elena was viewed as a local beauty in Key West.

Elena was the daughter of local cigar maker Francisco "Pancho" Hoyos (1883–1934) and Aurora Milagro (1881–1940). She had two sisters, Florinda "Nana" Milagro Hoyos (1906–1944), who married Mario Medina (c. 1905–1944) and also succumbed to tuberculosis; and Celia Milagro Hoyos (1913–1934).

On February 18, 1926, Elena married Luis Mesa (1908–1974), the son of Caridad and Isaac Mesa. Mesa left Elena shortly after she suffered a miscarriage, and moved to Miami. Elena was legally married to Mesa at the time of her death.

Elena was subsequently diagnosed with tuberculosis, a disease typically fatal at the time and which eventually would claim the lives of almost all of her immediate family. Tanzler attempted to cure Elena with a variety of treatments, remedies, X-rays, and other medical equipment that were brought to the Hoyos' home. Tanzler also showered Elena with gifts of jewelry and clothing, and allegedly professed his love to her, but no evidence has surfaced to show that Elena reciprocated any of his affection.

== Obsession ==
Despite Tanzler's best efforts, Elena died of tuberculosis at her parents' home in Key West on October 25, 1931. Tanzler paid for her funeral, and with the permission of her family, he then commissioned the construction of an above-ground mausoleum in the Key West Cemetery, which he visited almost every night.

He reportedly placed a telephone inside Elena's grave, so that he could continue speaking to her during the nights he spent away from her resting place, longing to maintain a sense of closeness despite her death.

evening in April 1933, Tanzler crept through the cemetery where Elena was buried and removed her body from the mausoleum, carting it through the cemetery after dark on a toy wagon, and transported it to his home. He reportedly said that Elena's spirit would come to him when he would sit by her grave and serenade her corpse with a favorite Spanish song. He also said that she would often tell him to take her from the grave.

Tanzler attached the corpse's bones with piano wire and fitted the face with glass eyes. As the skin of the corpse decomposed, Tanzler replaced it with silk cloth soaked in wax and plaster of Paris. As the hair fell out of Elena's decomposing scalp, Tanzler fashioned a wig from her hair, which he had previously obtained from her mother. Tanzler filled the corpse's abdominal and chest cavity with rags to keep the original form, dressed Elena's remains in stockings, jewelry, and gloves and kept the body in his bed. Tanzler also used copious amounts of perfume, disinfectants, and preserving agents to mask the odor and forestall the effects of the corpse's decomposition.

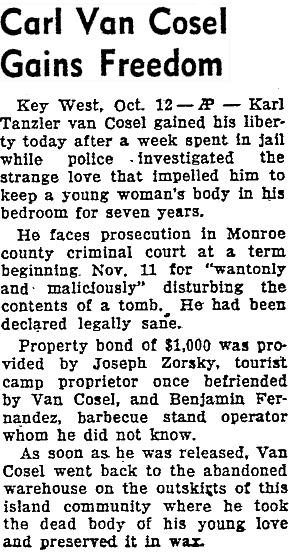
Carl Tanzler's release, Associated Press on October 12, 1940

In October 1940, Elena's sister Florinda heard rumors of Tanzler sleeping with the disinterred body of her sister. She confronted Tanzler at his home, where Elena's body was eventually discovered (he was also caught dancing with her corpse in front of an open window). Florinda notified the authorities, and Tanzler was arrested and detained. Tanzler was psychiatrically examined and found mentally competent to stand trial on the charge of "wantonly and maliciously destroying a grave and removing a body without authorization." After a preliminary hearing on October 9, 1940, at the Monroe County Courthouse in Key West, Tanzler was held to answer on the charge, but the case was eventually dropped. He was released, as the statute of limitations for the crime had expired.

Shortly after the corpse's discovery by authorities, physicians and pathologists examined Elena's body and put it on public display at the Dean-Lopez Funeral Home, where as many as 6,800 people viewed it. Elena's body was eventually returned to the Key West Cemetery where the remains were buried in an unmarked grave, in a secret location, to prevent further tampering. Her body was said to have been dismembered and placed in a metal box. Portions of the original memorial plaque commissioned by Tanzler and affixed to Elena Hoyos's mausoleum have been reassembled and are on display at the Martello Gallery-Key West Art and Historical Museum in Key West.

The facts underlying the case and the preliminary hearing drew much interest from the media at the time (most notably, from the Key West Citizen and Miami Herald) and created a sensation among the public, both regionally and nationwide. The public mood was generally sympathetic to Tanzler, whom many viewed as an eccentric "romantic."

Though not reported contemporaneously, research (most notably by authors Harrison and Swicegood) has revealed evidence of Tanzler's necrophilia with Elena's corpse. Two physicians (Dr. DePoo and Dr. Foraker) who attended the 1940 autopsy of Elena's remains recalled in 1972 that a paper tube had been inserted in the vaginal area of the corpse that allowed for intercourse. Others contend that since no evidence of necrophilia was presented at the 1940 preliminary hearing and because the physicians' "proof" surfaced in 1972, over 30 years after the case had been dismissed, the necrophilia allegation is questionable. While no existing contemporary photographs of the autopsy or photographs taken at the public display show a tube, the necrophilia claim was repeated by the HBO Autopsy program in 1999.

== Later life and death ==
In 1944, Tanzler moved to Pasco County, Florida, close to Zephyrhills, where he wrote an autobiography that appeared in the pulp publication Fantastic Adventures in 1947. His home was near his wife Doris, who helped to support Tanzler in his later years. Tanzler received United States citizenship in 1950 in Tampa.

Separated from his obsession, Tanzler used a death mask to create a life-sized effigy of Elena and lived with it until his death at age 75 on July 3, 1952. His body was discovered on the floor of his home three weeks after his death. He died under the name "Carl Tanzler".

It has been recounted that Tanzler was found in the arms of Elena's effigy upon discovery of his corpse. Still, his obituary reported that he died on the floor behind one of his organs. The obituary recounted: "a metal cylinder on a shelf above a table in it wrapped in silken cloth and a robe was a waxen image".

It has been written (most notably by Swicegood) that Tanzler had the bodies switched (or that Elena's remains were secretly returned to him) and that he died with the real body of Elena.

The story of Tanzler and Elena would be reproduced in pulp magazines in the years following his death, with various parties adding new details to the case. An article written by Michelfelder in 1982 tells of how renovation workers found a note allegedly written by Tanzler, confessing to have killed Elena by poisoning her:

She died because I gave this to her mercifully. I mixed the root of wolfsbane (monkshood) with aconite diluted. It was palatable and my loved one departed this miserable world on October 25, 1931. Suffer no more sweet Elena. I have sent you to the angels with my golden elixir...

Key West Police Chief Bienvenido Perez also claimed Tanzler had once told him that he "would kill Elena if necessary to fulfil [his] destiny". The poison confession letter article was also cited by historian David L. Sloan on episode 44 of the NightMerica podcast.

== See also ==
- Incidents of necrophilia
- Cadaver Synod
- Anatoly Moskvin
- Ed Gein
