= Academical Choir of Nizhny Novgorod State Linguistic University =

Academical Choir of Nizhni Novgorod State Linguistic University named after N. A. Dobrolyubov
- Choir
- Also known as: Choir LUNN
- Origin: Nizhny Novgorod, Russia
- Founded: 1991 (35 years ago)
- Genre: choral
- Members: 70 members
- Music director: Maxim Ivanov

Academical Choir of Nizhny Novgorod State Linguistic University (full name: Academical Choir of Nizhny Novgorod State Linguistic University named after N. A. Dobrolyubov/ Choir LUNN; Russian: Народный коллектив России Академический хор Нижегородского государственного лингвистического университета имени Н. А. Добролюбова/ Хор НГЛУ) - is one of the student (independent) creative artistic groups of LUNN.

== History ==
The LUNN Choir (also known as: Choir of Foreign Languages State University of Nizhny Novgorod) was founded in 1991 by the Merited Cultural Worker of Russia Federation Vera Ignatievna Sladchenko, on the premises of Foreign Languages State Pedagogical University of Nizhny Novgorod named after N. A. Dobrolyubov.

In 2001, the LUNN Choir was awarded the title of “The People’s Artistic Group of Russia”. From 2012 to 2016 the choir was led by Alyona Igorevna Yegorova - a graduate of the Nizhny Novgorod State Glinka Conservatoire. Since 2016, the artistic and chief conductor of the choir has been Maxim Aleksandrovich Ivanov, a laureate of international competitions, a graduate of the Nizhny Novgorod State Glinka Conservatoire, a teacher of the Nizhny Novgorod Musical College named after M.A. Balakirev.

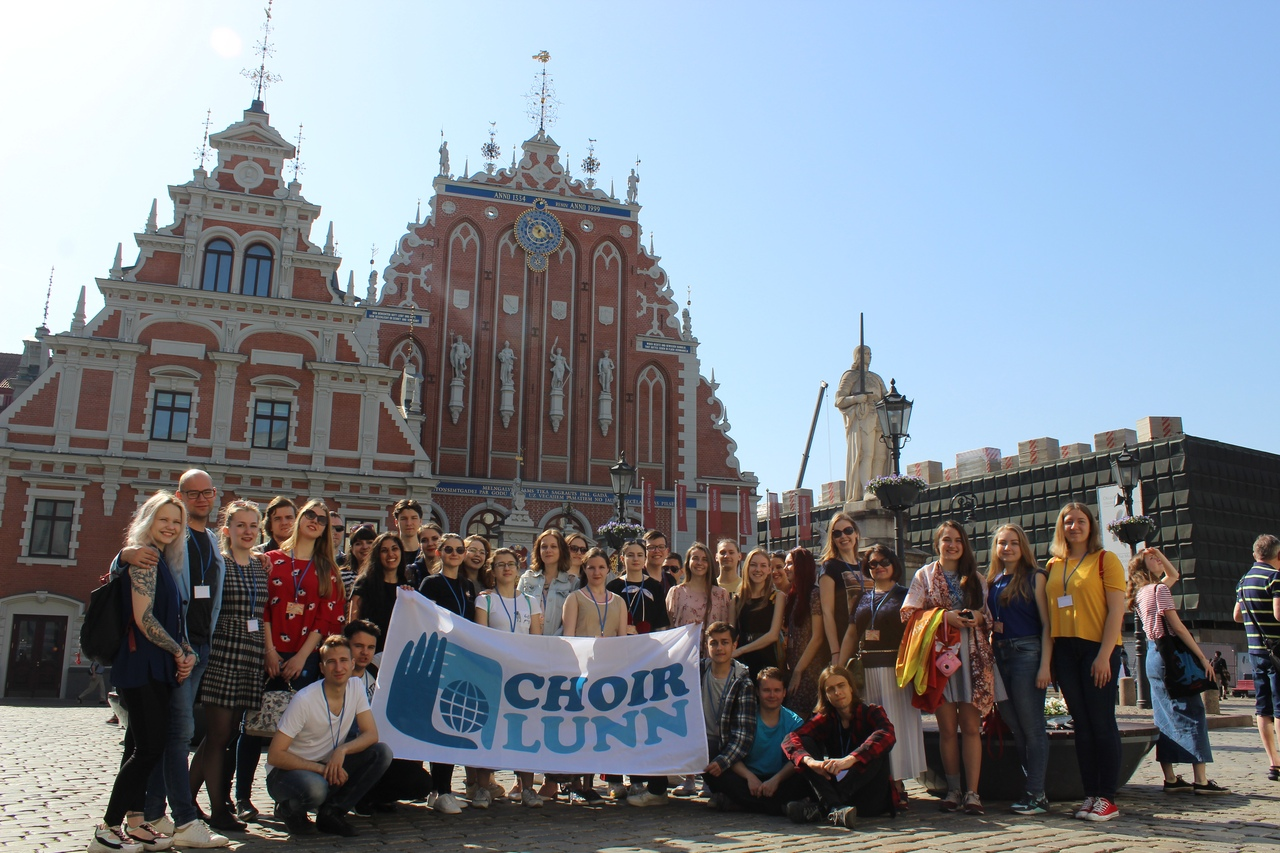
Choir LUNN in Riga, Republic of Latvia. 2019

Over the years, choirmasters and concertmasters of LUNN Choir were Dmitry Chadov, Galina Talamanova, Lilia Semyonova, Ksenia Yalynnaya, Maxim Ivanov, Alyona Yegorova, Narine Sargsyan, Elena Grishanova, Dinara Serebrennikova, Oleg Chernyshov, Olga Malova.

Songs in various languages of the world make up the majority of and are an integral part of the choir's repertoire. Through many years, the choir has performed songs in more than 50 languages, such as French, English, German, Italian, Latin, Japanese, Korean, Basque, Spanish, Greek, Turkish, Hebrew, Hindi, Balinese, Ukrainian, Polish, Czech, Latvian, Georgian, Tamil, etc.

In November 2018, LUNN Choir became the chief institutor of the International Choir Assembly "Coro di Linguisti", which unites student choirs of linguistic universities from Nizhny Novgorod, Moscow (student chapel choir "Musica Linguae" at the premises of Moscow State Linguistic University) and Minsk (student choir "CANTUS JUVENTAE" at the premises of Minsk State Linguistic University).

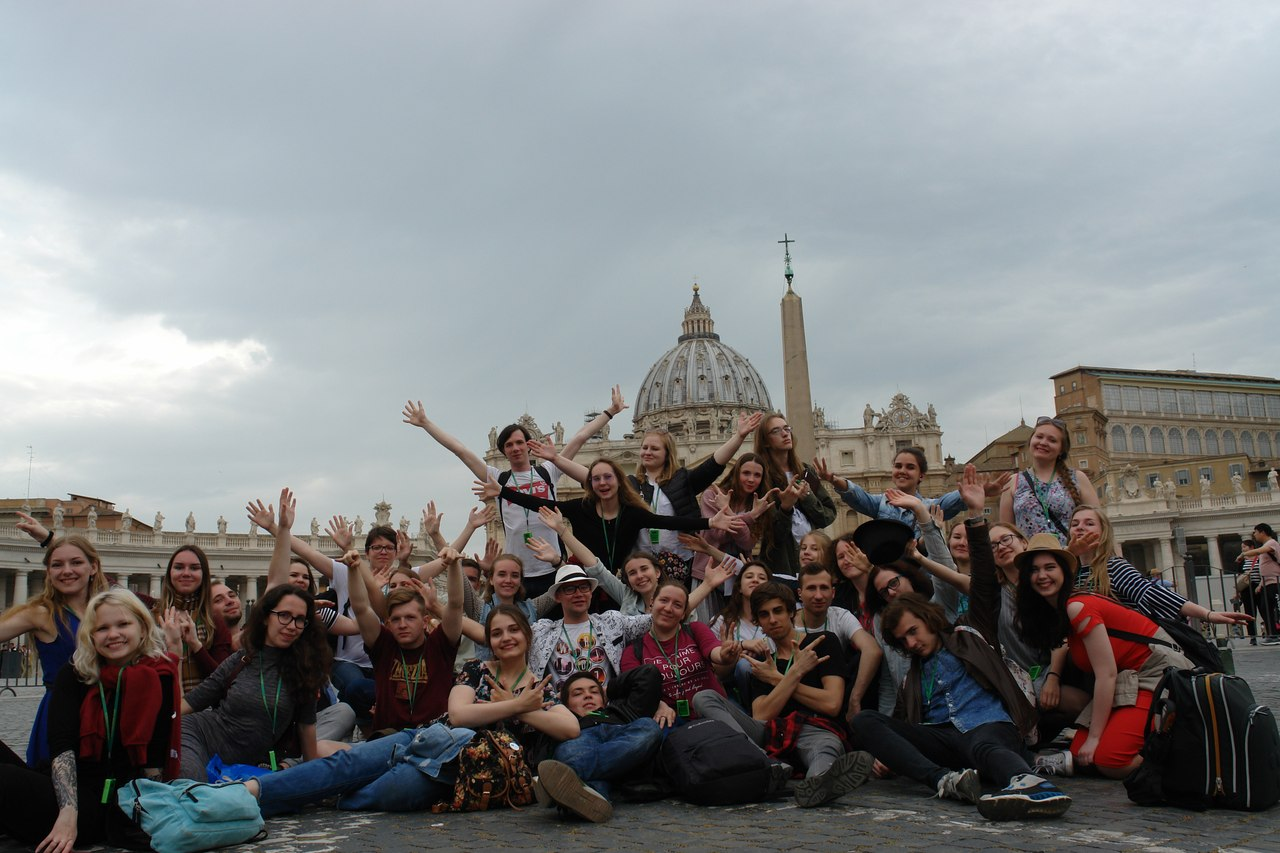
Choir LUNN in Rome, Italy. 2018

- “The LUNN Choir is one of the few Russian student groups that are seriously and enthusiastically engaged in their favorite work; the choir is distinguished by sincerity and an enthusiastic attitude towards music, the ingenuousness of its reception”.

Lev Sivukhin, People's Artist of the Russian Federation, Professor of Nizhny Novgorod State Glinka Conservatoire.

- “The LUNN Choir has a soft spot for the lyrical-romantic manner, which affects the style of its performance, in which I want to highlight the deep immersion with the author's idea, flexibility and elegance of details, coherence and softness of the sound”.

L.V. Shamina, professor of the Gnessin State Musical College.

- LUNN Choir "... occupies its rightful place amongst the best choirs of Russia, this group is a cultural icon of the famous Nizhny Novgorod choral school and a continuator of its deep and world-renowned traditions. Nowadays, such choral groups create the history of modern choral music".

Boris Tarakanov, professor, conductor, public figure.

The LUNN Choir released two repertory collections "LUNN Choir Sings". The author of the arrangements and processing is Georgy Pavlovich Muratov, professor of the Nizhny Novgorod State Glinka Conservatoire, a Merited Arts Worker of the Russian Federation.

== Music director and choirmasters ==
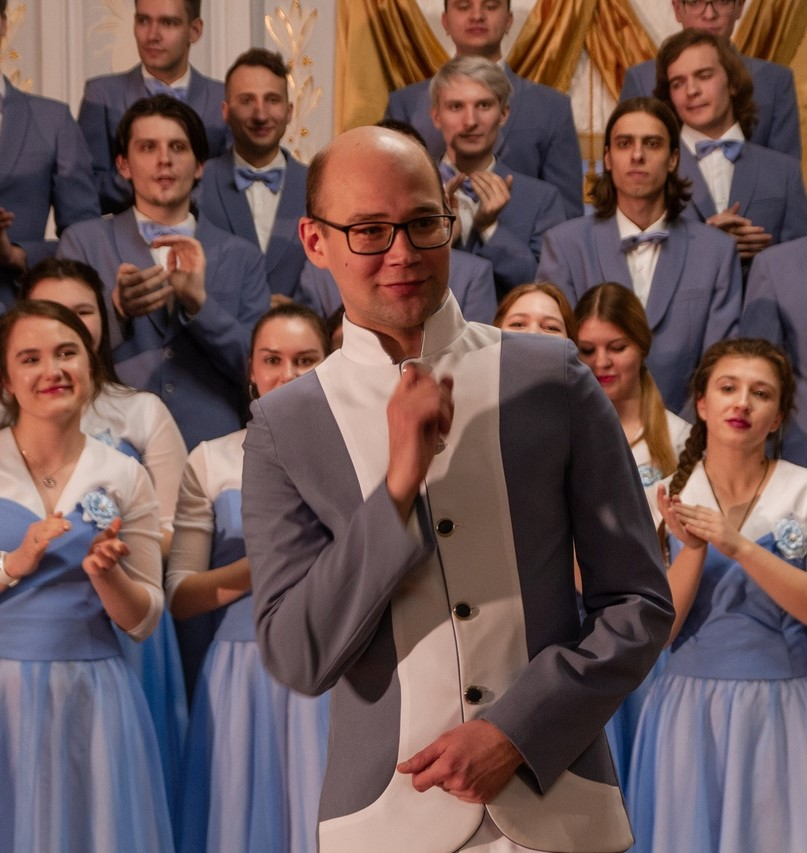
Maxim Ivanov

At present, the LUNN Choir’s music director and chief conductor is Maxim Aleksandrovich Ivanov.

He is an award winner of different international competitions and a music teacher from the Nizhny Novgorod Musical College named after M. A. Balakirev. He graduated from the Nizhny Novgorod State Glinka Conservatoire (under the leadership of professor V. A. Kurzhavsky) and assistant-internship (led by professor E. B. Fertelmeister). He is a music director of the Nizhny Novgorod Youth Choir, an institutor of the "Coro di Linguisti" International Choral Assembly (which integrates linguistic choirs of Nizhny Novgorod, Moscow and Minsk), the author and the instructor of the "Psychophysiology of musical performance" ILT (Instructor-led training), a member of the academic staff commission "Choral conducting" and "Vocal art " of the Nizhny Novgorod Musical College named after M. A. Balakirev. Maxim Ivanov is a frequent member of the jury in national and international competitions. Over the years, he was the leader of the Izhevsk Municipal Chamber Choir named after P. I. Tchaikovsky, the Youth Choir "Movement", the choir of music teachers of Nizhny Novgorod, as well as a conductor of children's choirs.

=== Choir LUNN choirmasters ===
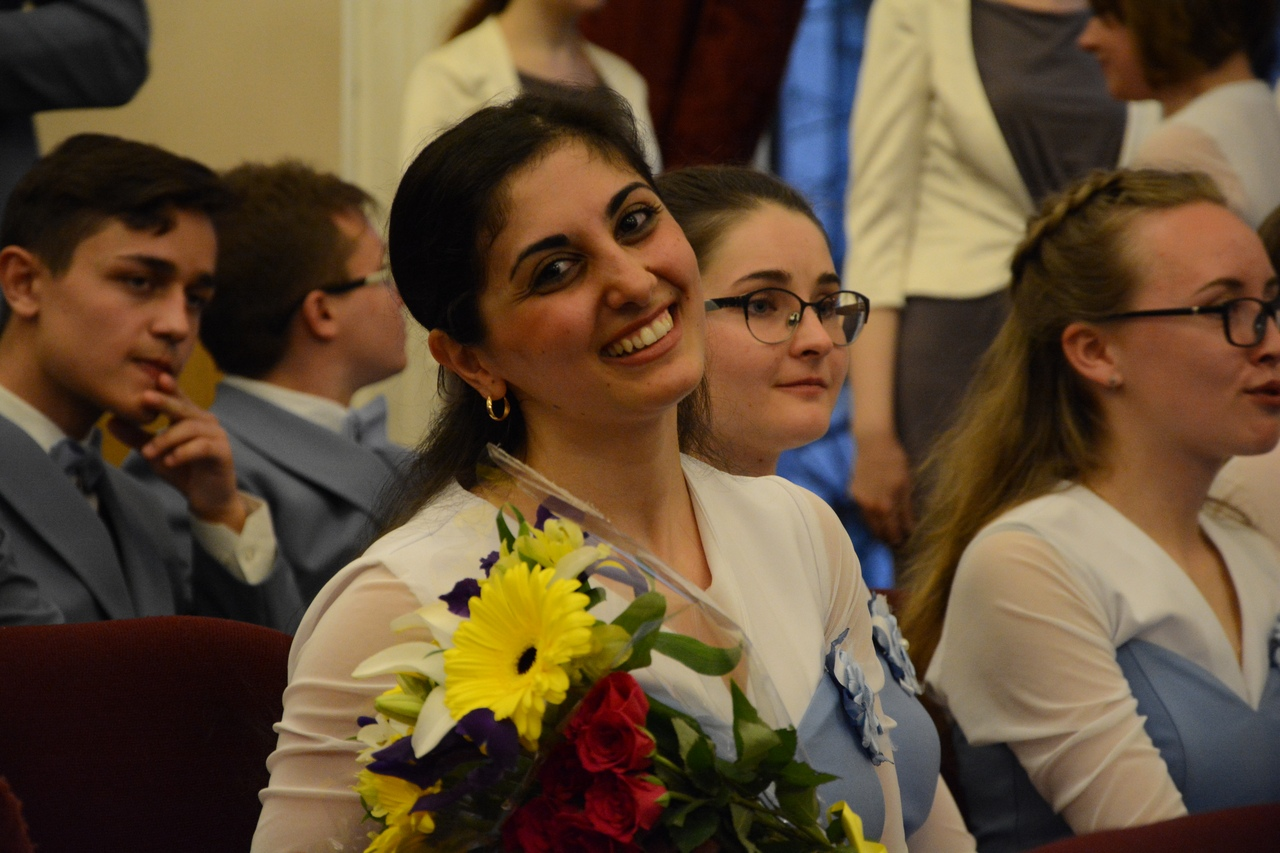
Narine Dvorshenko

==== Narine Vaganovna Dvorshenko ====
In 2009, she graduated from the Kirov College of Musical Arts named after I. V. Kazenin (led by Tatiana Evgenievna Shurakova). In 2014, she graduated from the Nizhny Novgorod State Glinka Conservatoire (under the leadership of professor E. B. Fertelmeister).

==== Alyona Igorevna Bondina ====
In 2007, She graduated with honors from the Izhevsk Republican Music College (led by M. B. Sannikova) and, in 2012, she graduated from the Nizhny Novgorod State Glinka Conservatoire (under the leadership of professor E. B. Fertelmeister).

== List of achievements ==
- The People’s Artistic Group of Russia (2001)
- A winner of the contest "Young Prague" (Czech Republic, 2007)
- Recipient of the Golden diploma during the international festival "Riva del Garda" (Italy, 2008)
- The recipient of the Grand Prix during the international festival named after F. Shalyapin in Yalta (2009)
- A winner of the contest-festival "Golden Voices" (Spain, 2010)
- A winner during the International Choral Festival in Vienna (Austria, 2014)
- A winner of the second "Christmas Choral Festival in Warsaw" (Poland, 2016)
- A winner of the International Choral Assembly "Golden Crane" (Moscow, 2017)
- The recipient of the first degree diploma from the International Competition-Festival "Viva Roma" (Italy, 2018)
- A recipient of the Golden diploma from the International Choral Assembly "Coro di Liinguisti" (Russia-Belarus, 2018)
- A winner of the second "International Choral Competition named after M.G. Klimov" (Kazan, 2019)
