= Anatoly Moskvin =

Russian ethnographer and linguist (born 1966)

- Анатолий Москвин
- Born: Anatoly Yuryevich Moskvin; 1 September 1966 (age 60); Gorky, Russian SFSR, Soviet Union
- Known for: Arrested in 2011 after the bodies of 26 mummified girls were discovered in his home.

Academic background
- Education: Moscow State University

Academic work
- Discipline: Linguist, philologist, historian
- Sub-discipline: Celtic studies
- Institutions: Nizhny Novgorod Linguistic University

Anatoly Yuryevich Moskvin (Russian: Анатолий Юрьевич Москвин, romanized: Anatolj Jur'evič Moskvin; born 1 September 1966) is a Russian linguist, philologist, and historian who was arrested in 2011 after the mummified bodies of 26 young girls between the ages of 3 and 13 were discovered in his apartment in Nizhny Novgorod. After exhuming the bodies from local cemeteries, Moskvin mummified the bodies before dressing and posing them around his home. Moskvin would celebrate their birthdays, watch fairytales with them, and read books to them. Moskvin's parents, who shared the apartment with him, knew of the "Dolls", but it did not occur to them that they were real girls. They had one mummified girl in their room.

A psychiatric evaluation determined that Moskvin had a form of paranoid schizophrenia. In May 2012, he was sentenced to court-ordered psychiatric evaluation and has since been held in a psychiatric hospital.

Vladimir Stravinskas, head of the Investigative Committee of Russia for the Nizhny Novgorod region, called the case exceptional and unparalleled in modern forensics.

== Personal life and education ==
Anatoly Moskvin was born in the city of Gorky in Soviet Russia, which is now known as Nizhny Novgorod. As a schoolboy, Moskvin began wandering through cemeteries with friends, particularly the Krasnaya Etna Cemetery in the city's Leninsky district. In an article written shortly before his arrest, he attributed his interest in the dead to a childhood incident in which he witnessed a funeral procession for an eleven-year-old girl. Moskvin alleged that the participants forced him to kiss the dead girl's face, writing that "an adult pushed my face down to the waxy forehead of the girl in an embroidered cap, and there was nothing I could do but kiss her as ordered."

After graduating from the philological faculty of Moscow State University, Moskvin became well known in academic circles. His main areas of academic interests were Celtic history and folklore, as well as languages and linguistics. Moskvin had a deep interest in cemeteries, burial rituals, death, and the occult. He kept a personal library of over 60,000 books and documents, as well as a large doll collection. Fellow academics described Moskvin as both a genius and an eccentric.

As an adult, Moskvin led a secluded life. He never married or dated, preferring to live with his parents. He abstained from drinking alcohol and smoking. In 2016, it was reported that Moskvin planned to marry a 25-year-old native of his hometown who attended his trial.

== Career ==
A former lecturer in Celtic studies at Nizhny Novgorod Linguistic University, Moskvin previously worked at the Institute of Foreign Languages. Moskvin is a philologist, linguist, and polyglot who speaks thirteen languages and has written several books, papers, and translations, all of which are well known in academic circles. Moskvin also occasionally worked as a journalist and regularly contributed to local newspapers and publications. Describing himself as a "necropolist", Moskvin was considered an expert on local cemeteries in Nizhny Novgorod Oblast.

In 2005, Oleg Riabov, a fellow academic and publisher, commissioned Moskvin to summarize and list the dead in more than 700 cemeteries in forty regions of Nizhny Novgorod Oblast. Moskvin claimed that over the next two years, he had gone on foot to inspect 752 cemeteries across the region, walking up to 30 km (18.6 miles) a day. During these travels, he drank from puddles, spent nights in haystacks and at abandoned farms, or slept in the cemeteries themselves, even going so far as to spend a night in a coffin being prepared for a funeral. On his extensive travels, Moskvin was sometimes questioned by police on the suspicion of vandalism and theft, but was never arrested or detained after stating his academic credentials and purpose. The work itself remains unpublished but has been described as "unique" and "priceless" by Alexei Yesin, the editor of Necrologies, a weekly paper to which Moskvin was a regular contributor. After his arrest, Yesin stated that he was confident there had been a mistake and Moskvin would be exonerated. Later, Yesin told the Associated Press that Moskvin was a loner who had "certain quirks" but who gave no indication that he was up to anything unusual.

Between 2006 and 2010, Moskvin worked as a freelance correspondent for the newspaper Nizhny Novgorod Worker, publishing articles twice a month. His father also sometimes wrote for the same paper. During 2008, Moskvin wrote an extensive series of articles on the history of Nizhny Novgorod cemeteries that appeared in the paper.

== Arrest and criminal proceedings ==
Moskvin was arrested on November 2, 2011, by police investigating a spate of grave desecrations in cemeteries in and around Nizhny Novgorod. Investigators from the Centre for Combating Extremism discovered 26 bodies, initially reported as 29 bodies, mummified and dressed as "dolls" in Moskvin's flat and garage. Video released by police shows the bodies seated on shelves and sofas in small rooms full of books, papers and general clutter. Although only 26 were discovered, Moskvin was suspected of desecrating as many as 150 graves after police found numerous grave accoutrements such as metal nameplates removed from headstones. Police also discovered instructions for making dolls, maps of cemeteries in the region, shoes with a footprint matching those found in some of the cemeteries, and a collection of photographs and videos depicting open graves and disinterred bodies, although none of this evidence could be conclusively connected to any of the bodies found in the apartment. According to the investigation, the bodies primarily came from cemeteries in the Nizhny Novgorod region, though some may have come from as far away as Moscow. Moskvin actively cooperated with investigators and claimed he made the dolls over the course of 10 years. His parents, who were away for large portions of the year, were unaware of his activities.

Moskvin was charged under Article 244 of the Criminal Code for the desecration of graves and dead bodies, a charge which carried up to five years in prison. Originally Moskvin was also accused of having defaced the graves of Muslims, considered a hate crime, but this charge was later dropped. After a psychiatric evaluation, it was determined that Moskvin had a form of paranoid schizophrenia. In a hearing on 25 May 2012, the Leninsky District Court of Nizhny Novgorod deemed Moskvin unfit to stand trial, releasing him from criminal liability. He was instead sentenced to "coercive medical measures". The prosecution was satisfied with the decision and did not appeal the verdict.

Moskvin was moved to a psychiatric clinic, with his stay to be reviewed regularly. In February 2013, a hearing approved an extension of his treatment. Moskvin's treatment was again extended April 2014, and yet again in July 2015. In 2014 a spokesman stated, "After three years of monitoring him in a psychiatric clinic, it is absolutely clear that Moskvin is not mentally fit for trial...He will therefore be kept for psychiatric treatment at the clinic." In September 2018 Moskvin's doctors stated that he was no longer dangerous and petitioned the court to release him for outpatient care from home; however, in February 2019 a subsequent psychiatric evaluation found that it was too early to release Moskvin, and the hospital withdrew their petition.

=== Motive ===
In an interview after his arrest, Moskvin stated he felt great sympathy for the dead children and thought that they could be brought back to life by either science or black magic. As an expert on Celtic culture, Moskvin learned that the ancient Druids slept on graves in order to communicate with spirits of their dead. He also studied the culture of the peoples of Siberia, in particular the ancient Yakuts, and discovered they had a similar practice for communicating with the dead. Moskvin began searching for obituaries of recently deceased children. When he found an obituary that "spoke" to him, he would sleep on the child's grave in order to determine if the spirit wished to be brought back to life. Moskvin claimed he had been doing this for around 20 years and insisted that when he began, he never dug up a grave without the permission of the child within. As he grew older, it became physically painful for him to sleep on the graves, so he began bringing the bodies home where it would be more comfortable to sleep near them. He hoped the spirits would be more willing to speak within a safe, welcoming home and that they might be easier to hear when they were no longer underground.

After exhuming the corpses, Moskvin researched mummification theories and techniques in an attempt to preserve the bodies. He dried the corpses using a combination of salt and baking soda and then cached the bodies in secure, dry places in and around cemeteries. Once the bodies dried, Moskvin carried them to his home where he used various methods to make "dolls" in an attempt to give the children functional bodies to be used when he eventually discovered a way to bring them back to life, feeling that their physical remains were too decayed and ugly for them to feel comfortable or happy. Unable to prevent the bodies from withering and shrinking as they dried, he would wrap the limbs in strips of cloth and stuff the body cavity with rags and padding to provide fullness, sometimes adding wax masks decorated with nail polish over the faces before dressing them in brightly coloured children's clothes and wigs. These details made the bodies appear to be large homemade dolls, which prevented their discovery. It was unclear if each doll contained a full set of human remains.

Moskvin was aware that he was committing a crime, but felt the dead children were "calling out" to be rescued and believed that rescuing the children was more important than obeying the law. He was also motivated by his own desire to have children, specifically a daughter. Moskvin often regretted that he never had children and at one point attempted to adopt a young girl against the wishes of his parents, but his application was declined due to his low income. Moskvin denied any sexual attraction to the dolls and instead considered them to be his children. He spoke to and interacted with the corpses, sang songs to them, watched cartoons with them, and even held birthday parties and celebrated holidays for their benefit.

== Works ==
Publications contributed to:

- Moskvin wrote regularly for Necrologies, a weekly newspaper that publishes obituaries and stories about cemeteries and famous dead people.
- In 2009–2010 he regularly contributed to the newspaper Nizhny Novgorod Worker.

Dictionaries

- English-Russian and Russian-English dictionary of the most common words and expressions. About 45 000 words. / Comp. Moskvin A. Yu. – M.: Tsentrpoligraf, 2009. – 719 p. – (Large vocabulary). – ISBN 978-5-9524-4088-3.
- School Anglo-Russian and Russian-English dictionary / comp. Moskvin A. Yu. – M.: Tsentrpoligraf, 2014. – 640 p. – (School dictionaries). – ISBN 978-5-227-05185-1.
- Great Dictionary of Foreign Words. Over 25,000 words / comp. Moskvin A. Yu. – 7 th ed., Rev. and additional .. – M.: Tsentrpoligraf, 2008. – 688 p. – (Large vocabulary). – ISBN 978-5-9524-3984-9.
- School phrasebook Russian language / comp. Moskvin A. Yu. – M.: Tsentrpoligraf, 2012, 2013. – 639 p. – (School dictionaries). – ISBN 978-5-227-04592-8.

Translations

- Wilson T. History of the swastika from ancient times to the present day = The Swastika: The Earliest Known symbol and Its Migrations / per. with English .: Moskvin A. Yu. – N. Novgorod Books, 2008. – 528 p. – ISBN 978-5-94706-053-9.

Essays/Chapters

- Moskvin A. Yu Cross without crucifix // The history of the swastika from ancient times to the present day. – N. Novgorod: Publishing House "Books", 2008. – S. 355–526. – 528 p. – ISBN 978-5-94706-053-9.

== In popular culture ==
The Liljevalchs Art Gallery in Stockholm, Sweden showed an art piece in 2016 by Sonja Nilsson consisting of nine dolls replicating those made by Anatoly Moskvin.

== See also ==
- Andrey Chikatilo
- Body snatching
- Burke and Hare murders
- Carl Tanzler
- Ed Gein
- Grave robbery
