= Solares Hill =

Hill in Key West, Florida, U.S.

Coordinates: 24.555394°N 81.798859°W

Solares Hill is the highest point of land on the island of Key West in the lower Florida Keys in Monroe County, Florida.

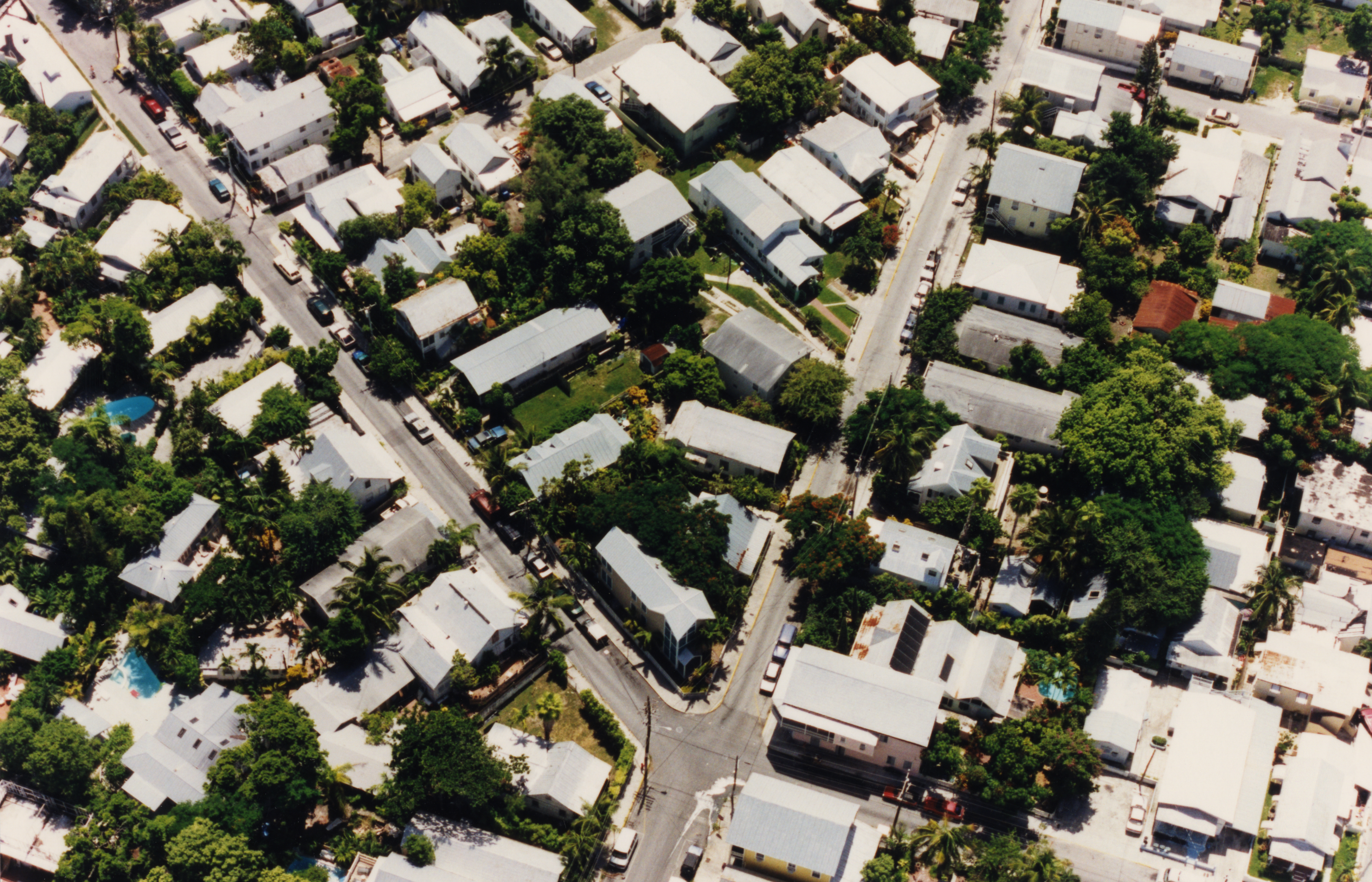
Aerial view of Solares Hill in Key West, 1999.

Solares Hill derives its name from Victorio Solares, born on 30 April 1849 in Coya, Asturias, Spain. He immigrated to Key West following Spanish military service in Cuba and became a grocer. He married Mary Jane Lumley.

The peak elevation of the hill is 18 feet (5.5 m) above sea level.

The summit of the hill is near Key West Cemetery in the section of the island called Old Town, Key West, at and around where Elizabeth Street, Angela Street, and Windsor Lane intersect.

Solares Hill is also the name of a former weekly newspaper, founded in 1971 and independent until 1998, when it was bought by The Key West Citizen, the only local daily newspaper. It is now published as a section of the newspaper's Sunday edition.
