= Key West Cemetery =

Cemetery in Key West, Florida

- Interactive map of Key West Cemetery

Details
- Established: 1847
- Location: 701 Passover Lane; Key West, Florida
- Country: United States
- Coordinates: 24°33′21″N 81°47′44″W
- Type: Urban cemetery
- Owned by: City of Key West
- Size: 19 acres (7.7 ha)
- No. of graves: 80,000-100,000
- Website: Historic Key West Cemetery

The Key West Cemetery (officially, Historic Key West City Cemetery) is a 19-acre (77,000 m^{2}) cemetery at the foot of Solares Hill on the island of Key West, Florida, United States.

It is estimated that as many as 100,000 people are buried there, many more than the 30,000 residents who currently live on the island.

It is in the northwest section of the Old Town area of the island.

== History ==
In 1847 it was established at its current location after an 1846 hurricane washed dead bodies from the earlier cemetery out of the coastal sand dunes on Whitehead Point near the West Martello Towers. An African Memorial Cemetery was dedicated beside the West Martello Tower in 2009. Slaves, ill from the sea voyage to slavery in "The New World," were buried there prior to the US Civil War.

In 2005, the cemetery was among those profiled in the PBS documentary A Cemetery Special.

One headstone has a birthdate of 1792. Another records a death in 1843.

== Notable grave sites ==
- “Sloppy” Joe Russell (1889-1941)
- B.P. “Pearl” Roberts (1929-1979) - “I Told you I was Sick.”
- Gloria M. Russell (1926-2000) - “I’m just resting my eyes.”
- Miriam Albury (1882-1933) - Stuffed bunny on the grave for 14+ years
- Maria Elena Milagro de Hoyos (1909-1931), a local beauty during 1920s, grave unmarked due to her infamous grave robbing by Carl Tanzler, a German radiology technician who had an obsession with her

== Gallery ==
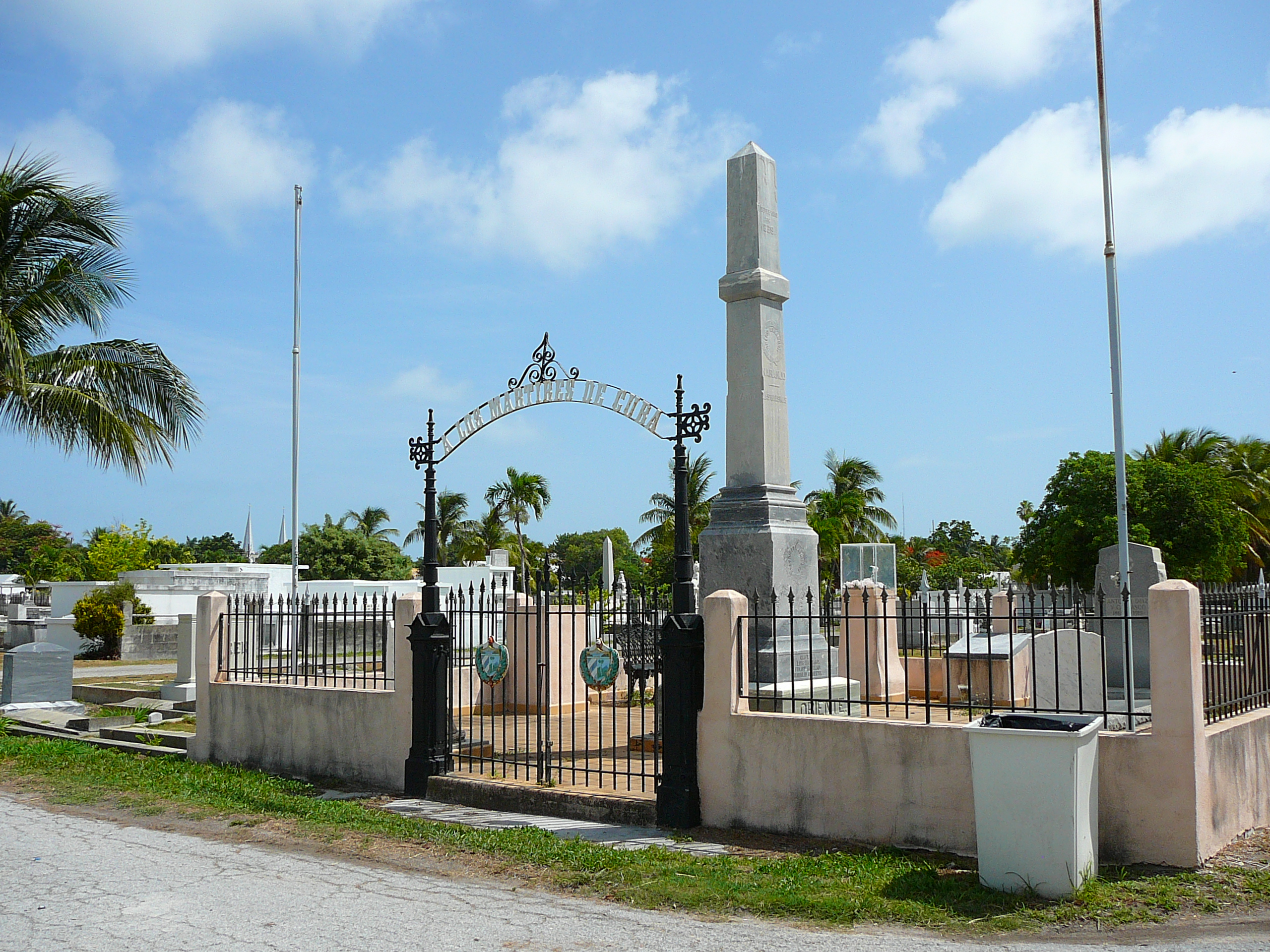
"A los martires de cuba" Section for Cuban independence fighters in the Ten Years' War

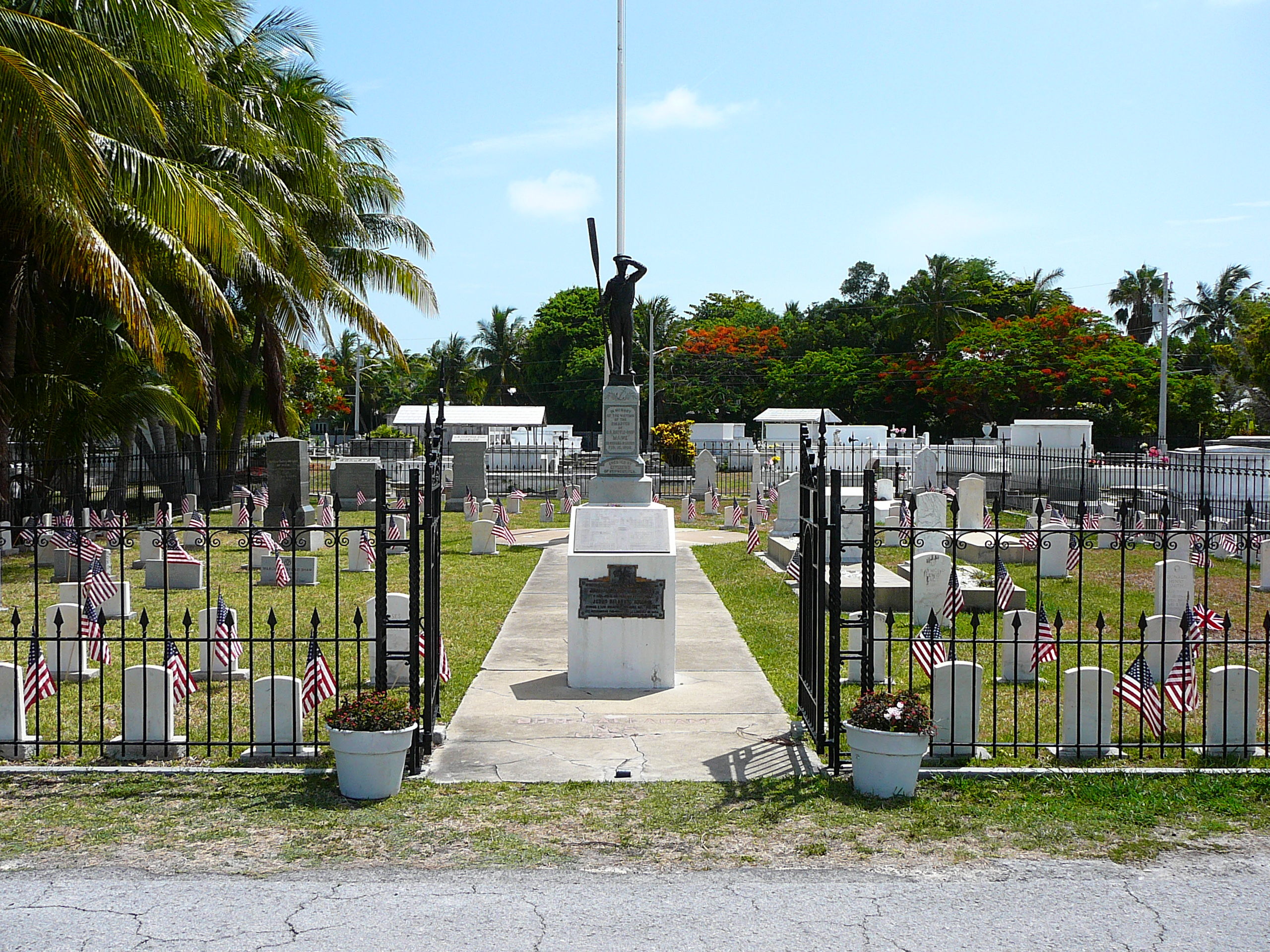
Battleship Maine memorial section

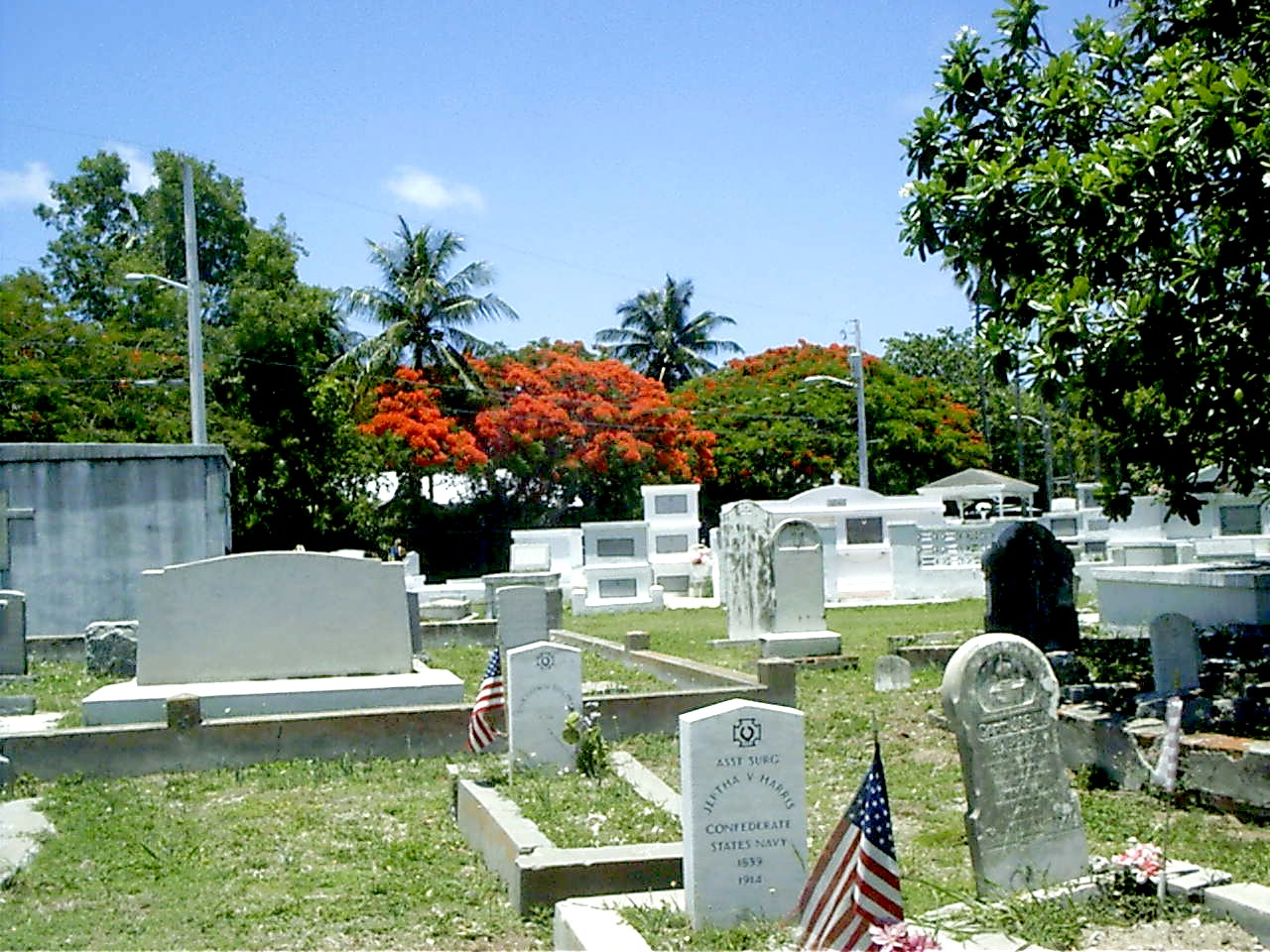
Area containing Confederate Navy sailors' graves

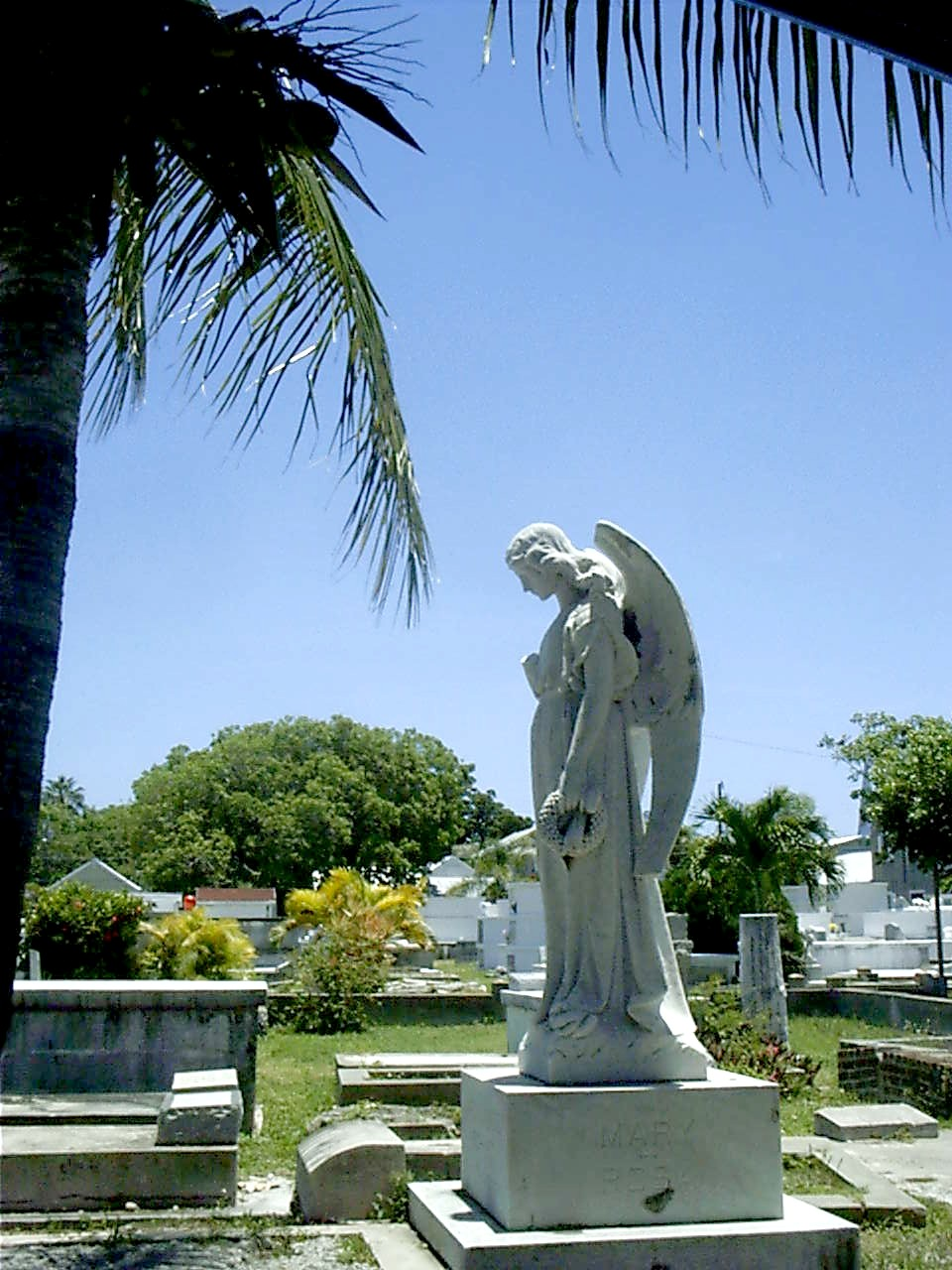
Historic Angel grave marker

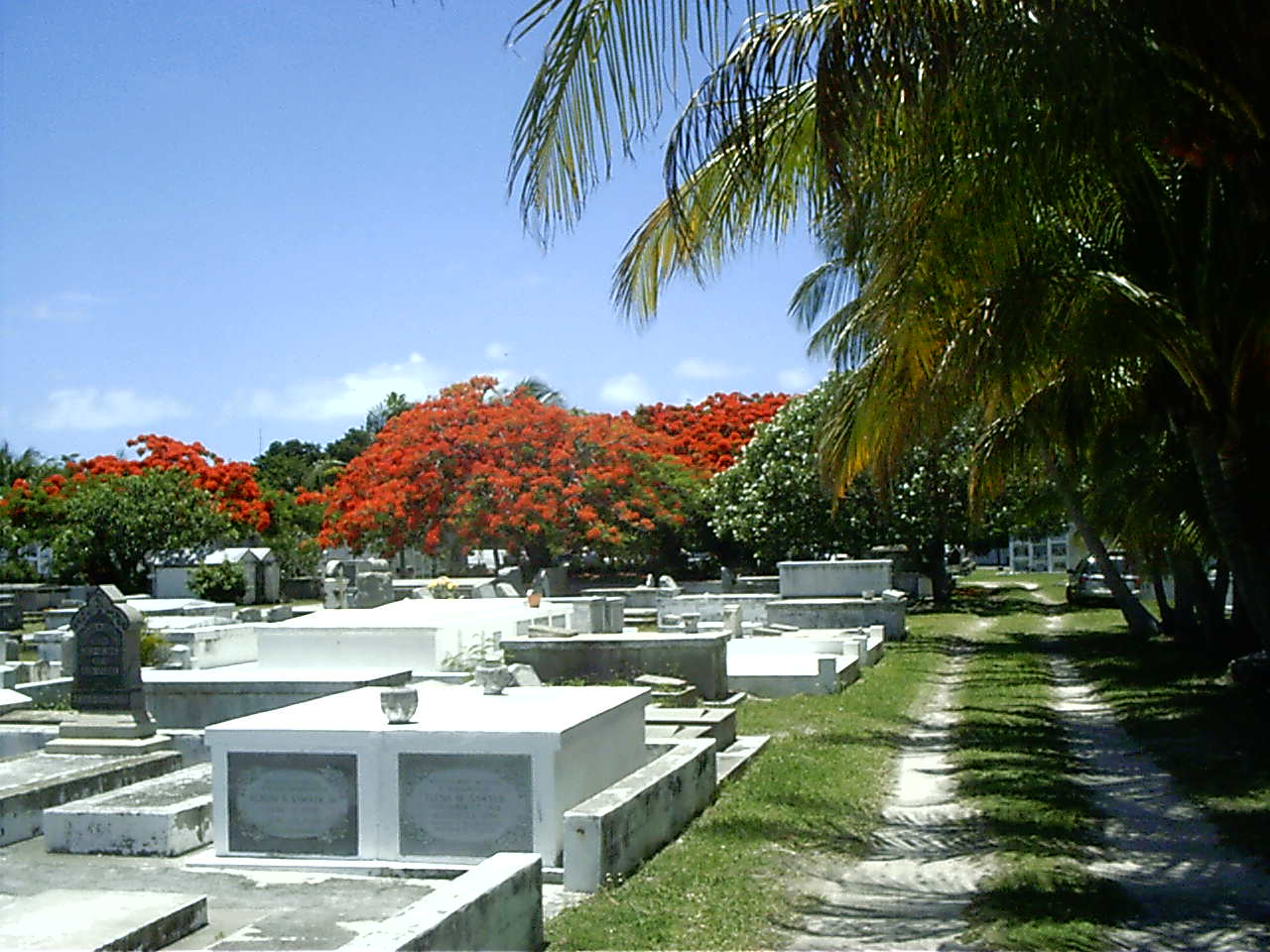
Some newer graves are put in above-ground vaults, similar to the cemeteries in New Orleans, since the space for below-ground burials has become increasingly limited.

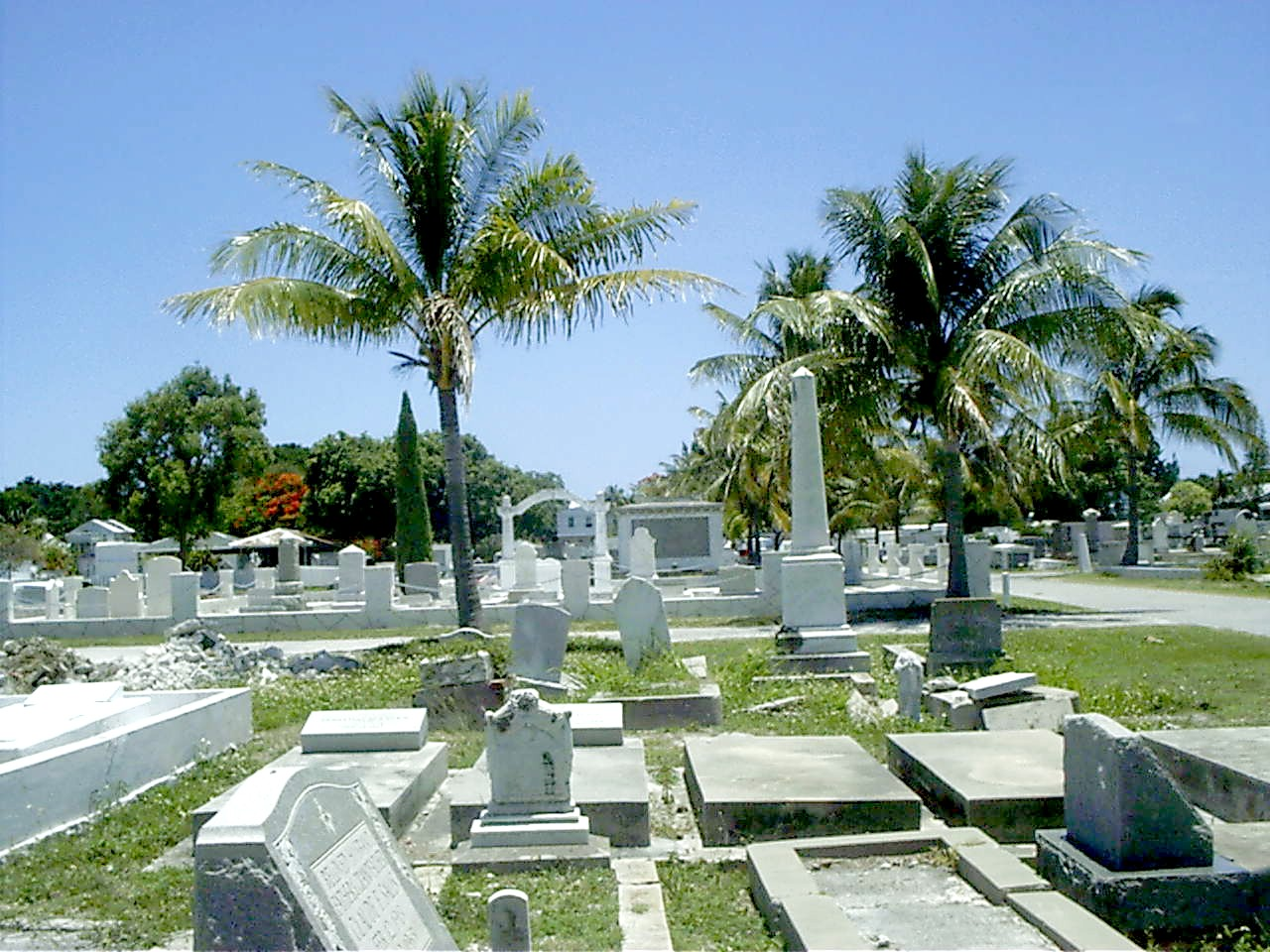
Many older graves date back to the mid-1800s and are weathered, broken and\or illegible.

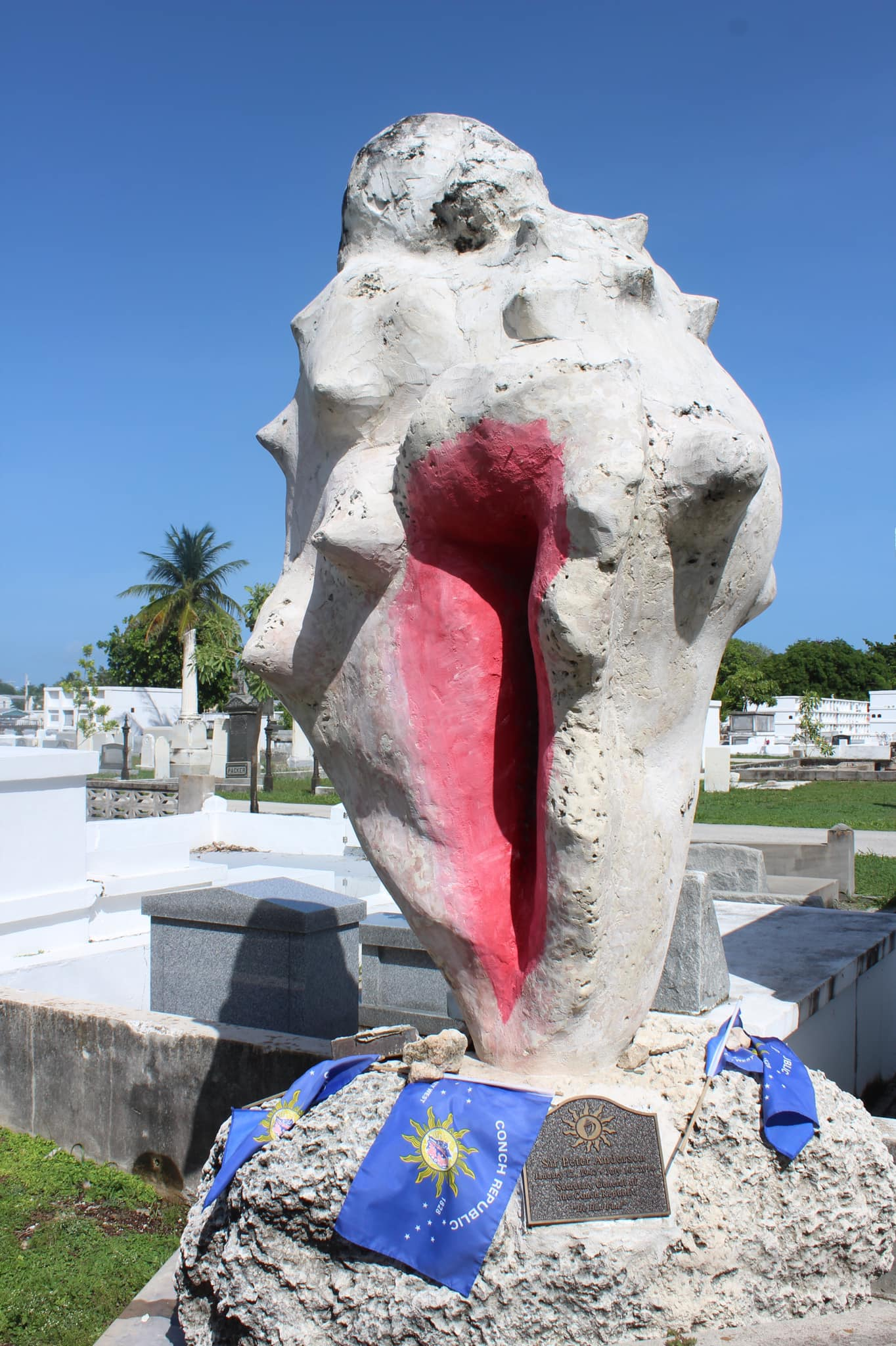
Grave of the Secretary General of the Conch Republic: Sir Peter Anderson

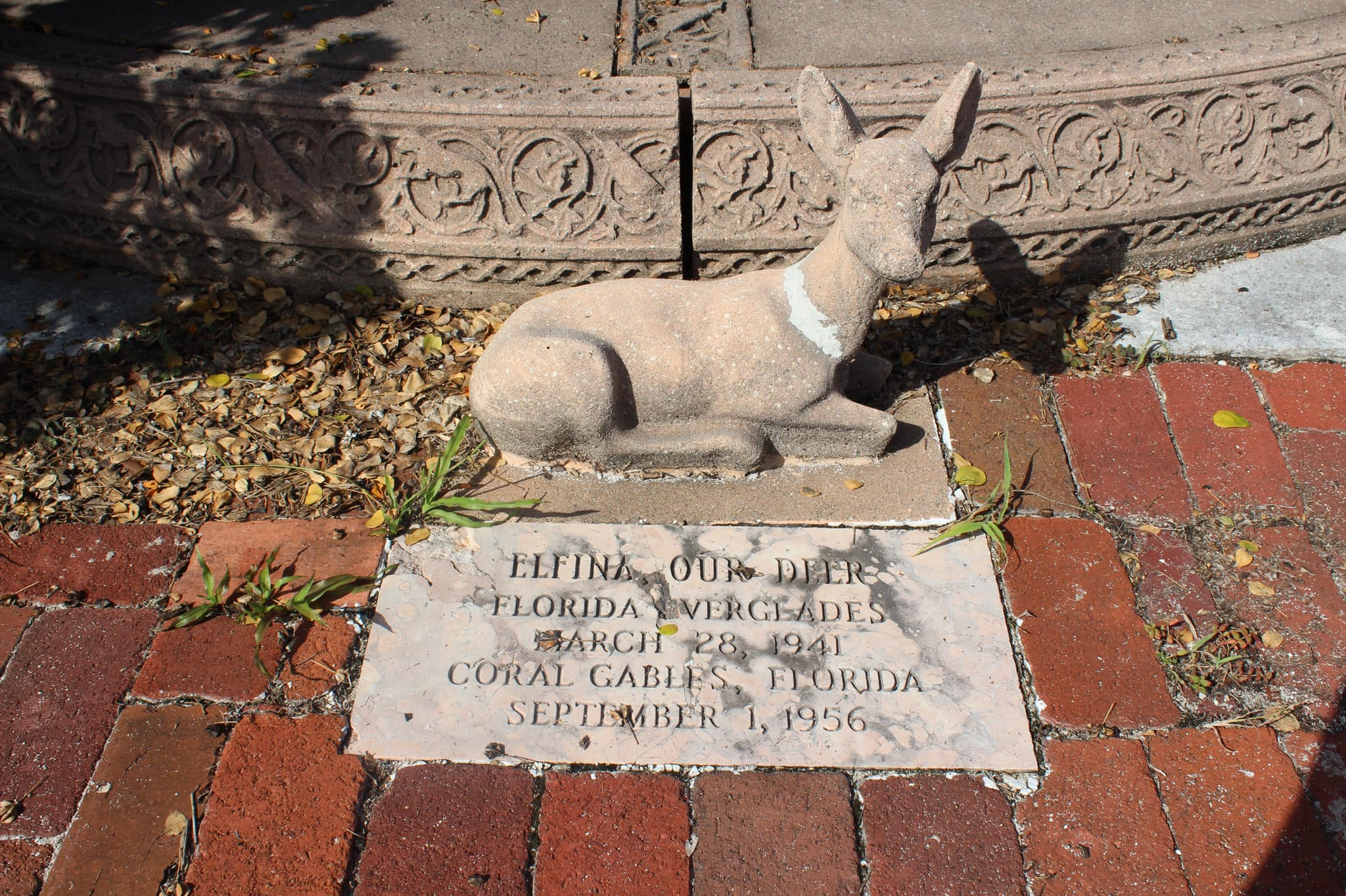
Grave of a deer belonging to a Key West family
