= Rosicrucian Digest =

Publication of the Ancient Mystical Order Rosae Crucis

Rosicrucian Digest is a publication of Ancient Mystical Order Rosae Crucis (AMORC), published continuously from 1915.

It is sent to members via correspondence, but it is also available to the general public. Issues of Rosicrucian Digest can be read at the website of the English Grand Lodge of the Americas.

It is not the same as Rosicrucian Forum, another publication of AMORC that is available only to members. In the past, Rosicrucian Digest was named Mystic Triangle.

== See also ==
- Rosicrucian Forum
- AMORC
- Rosicrucianism
