= Internment in the United Kingdom during the First World War =

The British government was initially reluctant to impose widespread internment in the United Kingdom during the First World War, choosing instead to restrict the activities of nationals of enemy nations residing in the UK and interning only those suspected of being a threat to national security. Public anti-German sentiment peaked with the sinking of the Lusitania on 7 May 1915, and the subsequent rioting forced the government to implement a general programme of internment.

== Initial measures ==
In 1914, there were up to 75,000 nationals of enemy states residing in the UK, and on the outbreak of the First World War there was concern that this community would engage in acts of espionage and sabotage. Under the Aliens Restriction Act, passed on 5 August, all foreign nationals were required to register with the police, and by 9 September just under 67,000 German, Austrian and Hungarian nationals had done so. Areas important to national security, such as defence works, military bases and, by November, the whole of the east and most of the south coast were designated as prohibited; nationals of an enemy state residing in such areas were required to obtain a permit, and those who were denied permission were given four days to relocate. Enemy aliens were also required to obtain a permit to travel more than five miles from home, and they were prohibited from possessing means of communication, such as signalling apparatus and carrier pigeons, and owning photographic equipment, military maps and motorised transport. A decision on 7 August by the military authorities to intern all nationals of enemy states between the ages of 17 and 42 then in the UK was quickly rescinded.

== General internment ==
The policy on internment shifted throughout the first nine months of the war, but targeted only foreigners suspected of being a threat to national security and was repeatedly suspended due to lack of facilities in which to intern them. By the end of September, over 10,500 enemy nationals were being held, but between November 1914 and April 1915 few arrests were made and thousands of internees were actually released. Government policy changed significantly when public anti-German hostility, which had been building since the previous October following reports of German atrocities in Belgium, surged after the sinking of the Lusitania on 7 May 1915. For a week, some of the most widespread rioting witnessed in wartime Britain occurred in towns and cities across the country, during which virtually every German-owned shop had its windows broken. Although the government believed that enemy nationals still at liberty posed no military threat, it was forced to bow to public pressure and implement a general programme of internment. For their own safety as much as that of the British population, all non-naturalised enemy nationals of military age were to be interned, while those over military age were to be repatriated. By 1917, the small number of enemy nationals still residing at liberty and the fact that no acts of sabotage had been committed since the declaration of war allowed the home army to relax its guard of vulnerable points, leaving only a small number of places of vital national interest still under protection.

== Bibliography ==
- Bird, J. C. (2015). Control of Enemy Alien Civilians in Great Britain, 1914–1918. Abingdon, Oxon: Routledge. ISBN 9781138857667.
- Denness, Zoë Andrea (October 2012). A Question Which Affects Our Prestige as a Nation: The History of British Civilian Internment, 1899–1945 (PDF) (Thesis). University of Birmingham.
- Payani, Panikos (2013). Prisoners of Britain: German Civilian and Combatant Internees During the First World War. Manchester: Manchester University Press. ISBN 9780719078347.
- Payani, Panikos (2014). Enemy in our Midst: Germans in Britain during the First World War. London: Bloomsbury. ISBN 9781847881847.
- Pearsall, Mark (24 March 2017). "Enemy aliens in Great Britain 1914—1919". Richmond, Surrey: National Archives.
