= N. A. Dobrolyubova State Linguistic University of Nizhny Novgorod =

Nizhny Novgorod State Linguistic University
- Нижегородский государственный лингвистический университет имени Н. А. Добролюбова
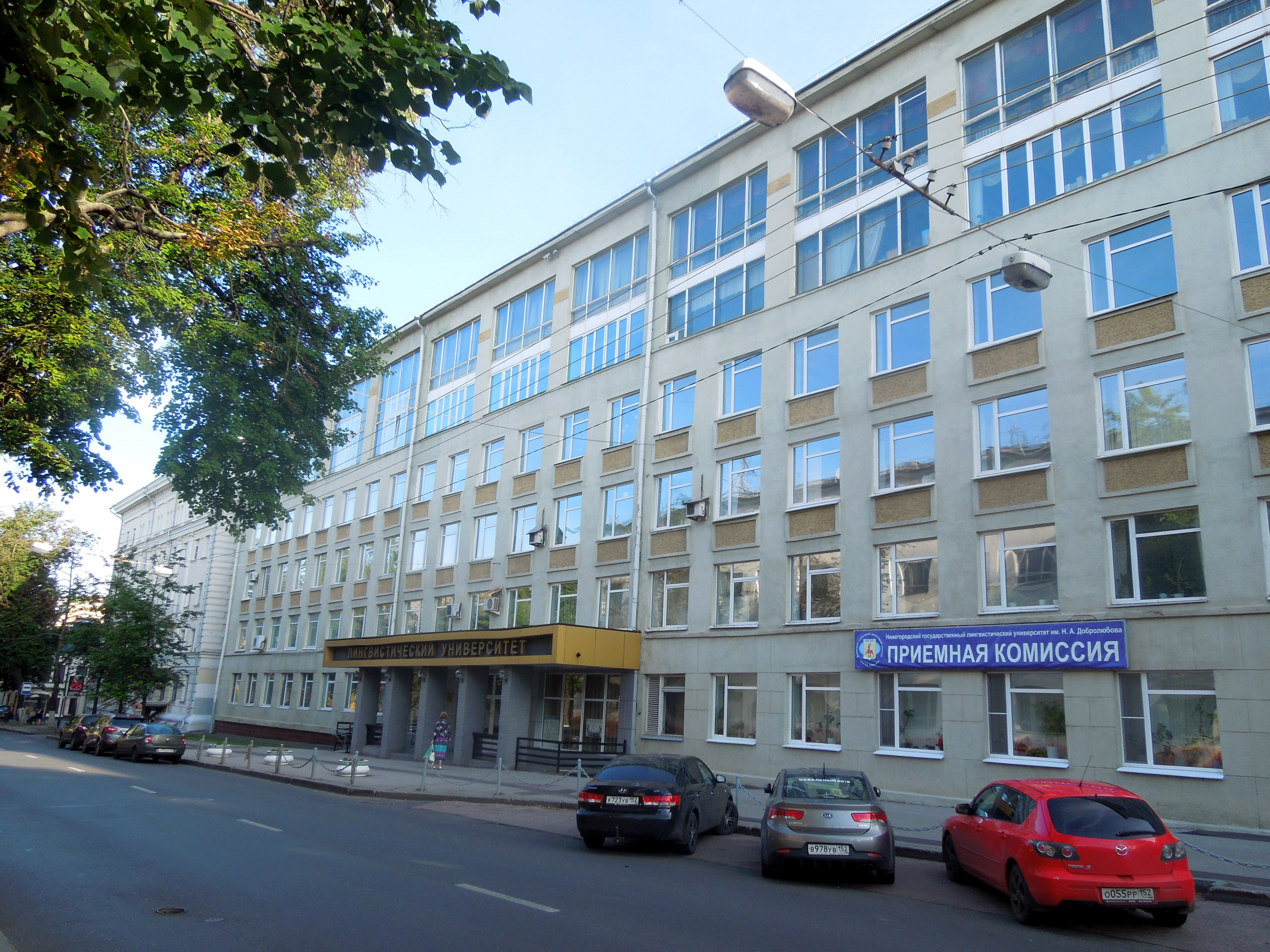
- Latin: Dobrolyubov Nizhny Novgorod Linguistic publica University
- Former names: Gorky Pedagogical Institute of Foreign Languages
- Type: Public
- Established: 1937
- President: Zhigalev Boris Andreevich
- Rector: Nikonova Zhanna Viktorovna
- Academic staff: 227
- Administrative staff: 417
- Undergraduates: 3150 (2018)
- Location: Minin st., 31a, Nizhny Novgorod, Nizhny Novgorod Region, Russia; 56°19′29″N 44°01′42″E
- Campus: Urban
- Language: Russian
- Colors: Blue, white
- Website: http://www.lunn.ru/en

Nizhny Novgorod Dobrolyubov State Linguistic University is an institution of higher education in the city of Nizhny Novgorod, Russia, and it is one of two linguistic universities in Russia. The institution was established in the year 1937 as the Gorky Pedagogical Institute of Foreign Languages.

== History ==
In 1917 the municipal language courses were established in Nizhny Novgorod. Based on those courses, the Gorky Pedagogical Institute of Foreign Languages was founded in 1937. Initially, the Institute trained teachers of English, German, French, and Spanish for secondary schools and had, respectively, three faculties: English, German, and Romance languages.

In 1964, the Faculty of Translation of Western European languages was established. In 1994 the institute was given the status of a Linguistic University.

== Gallery ==
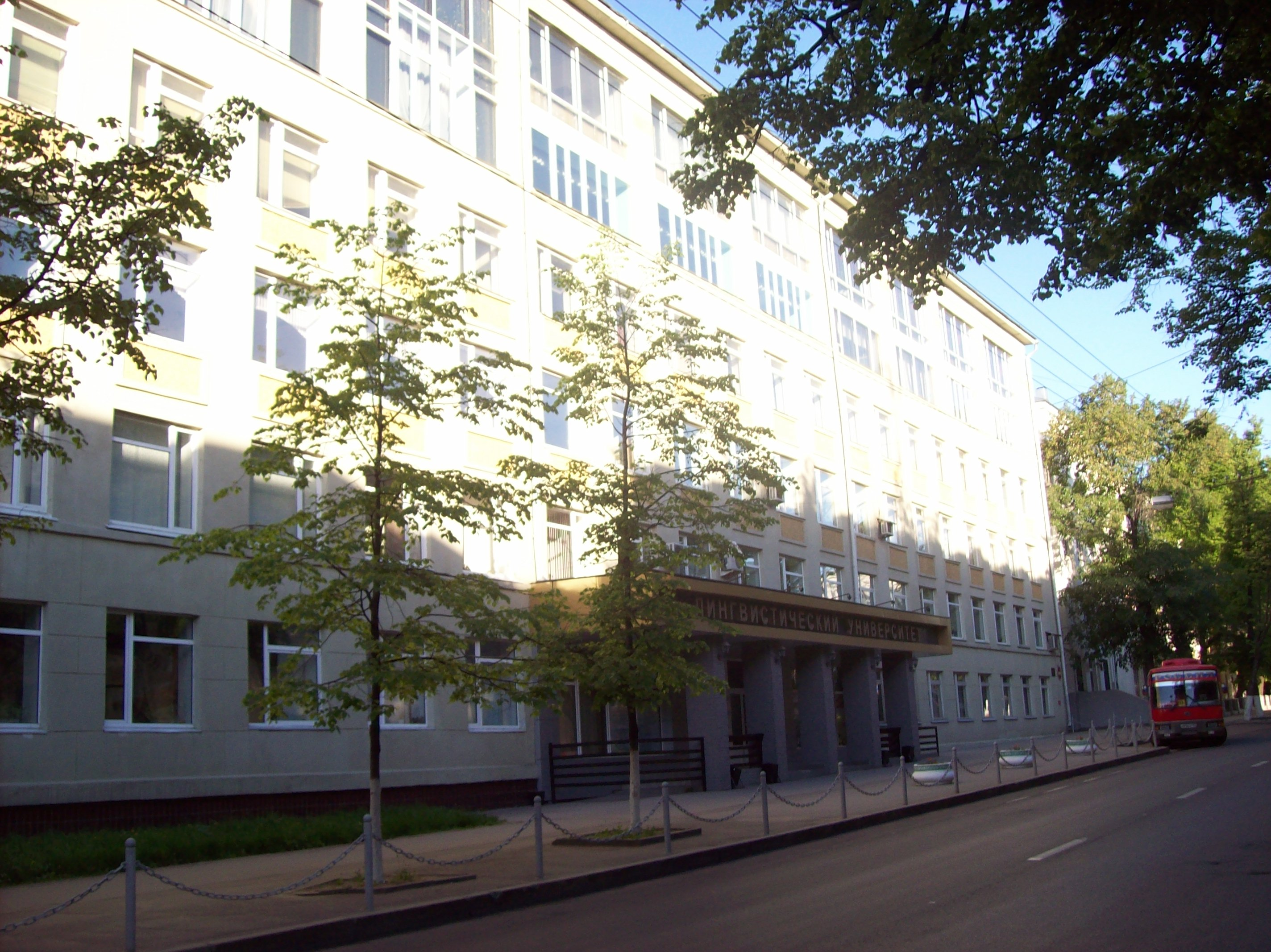

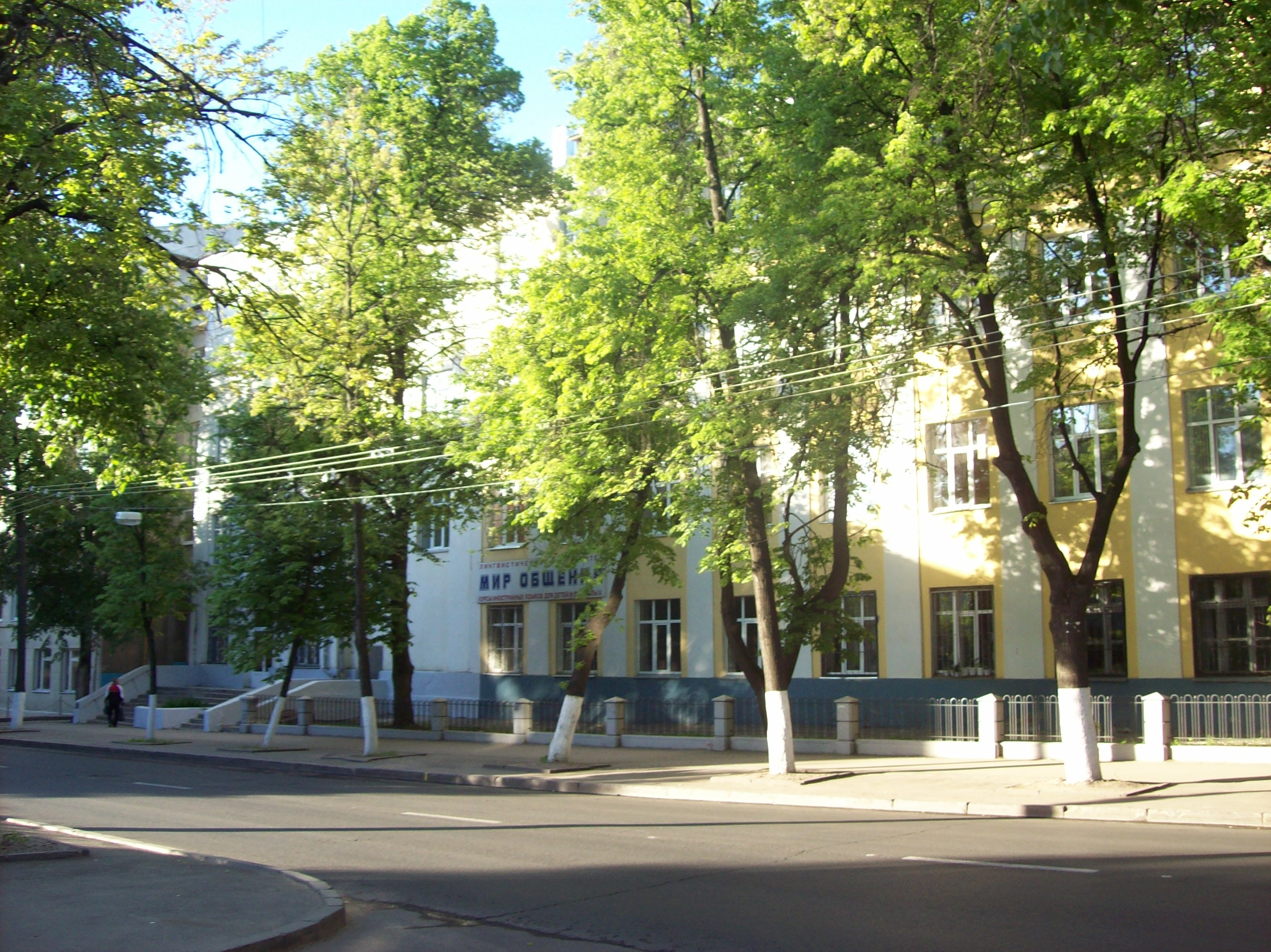

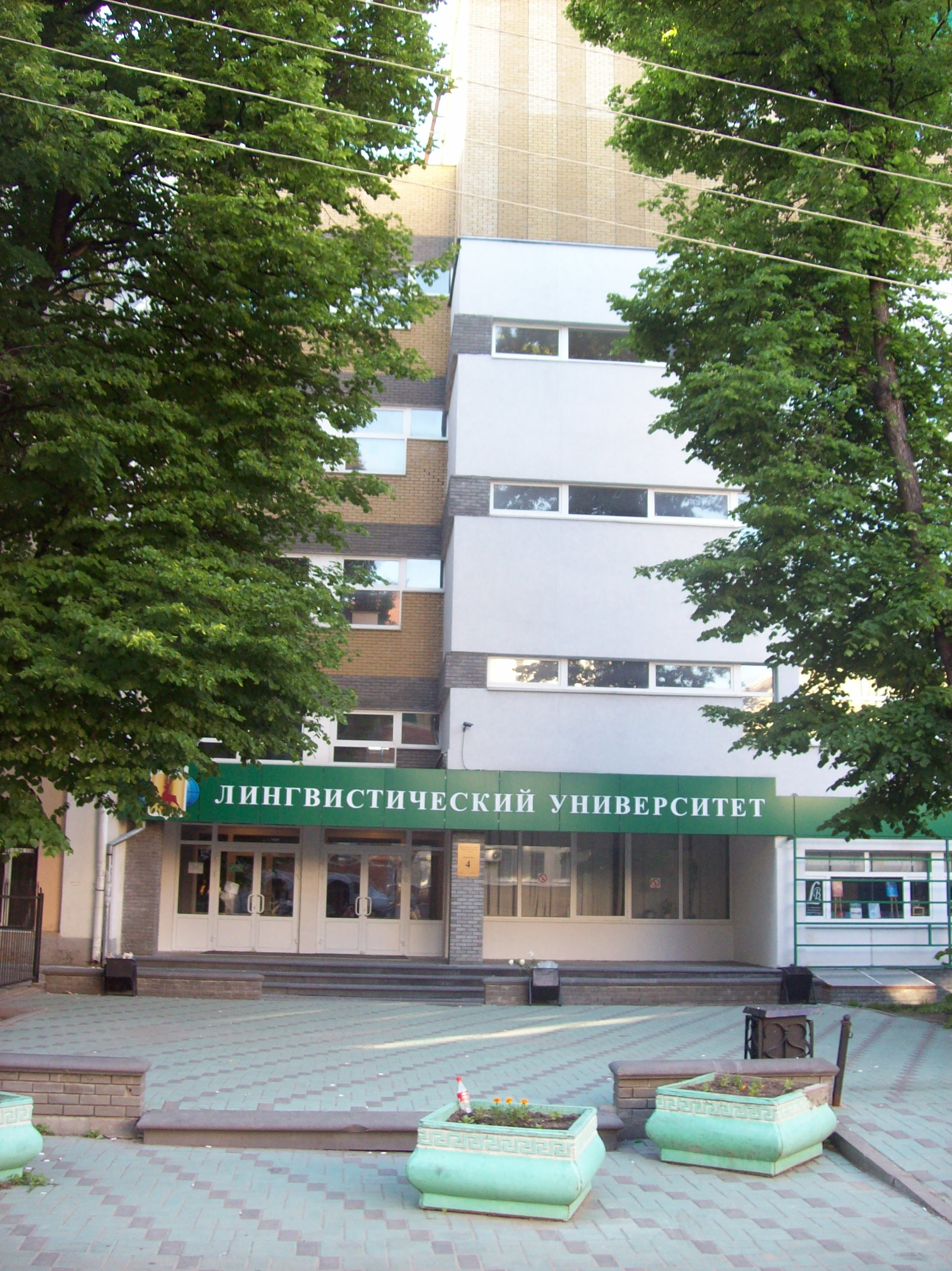

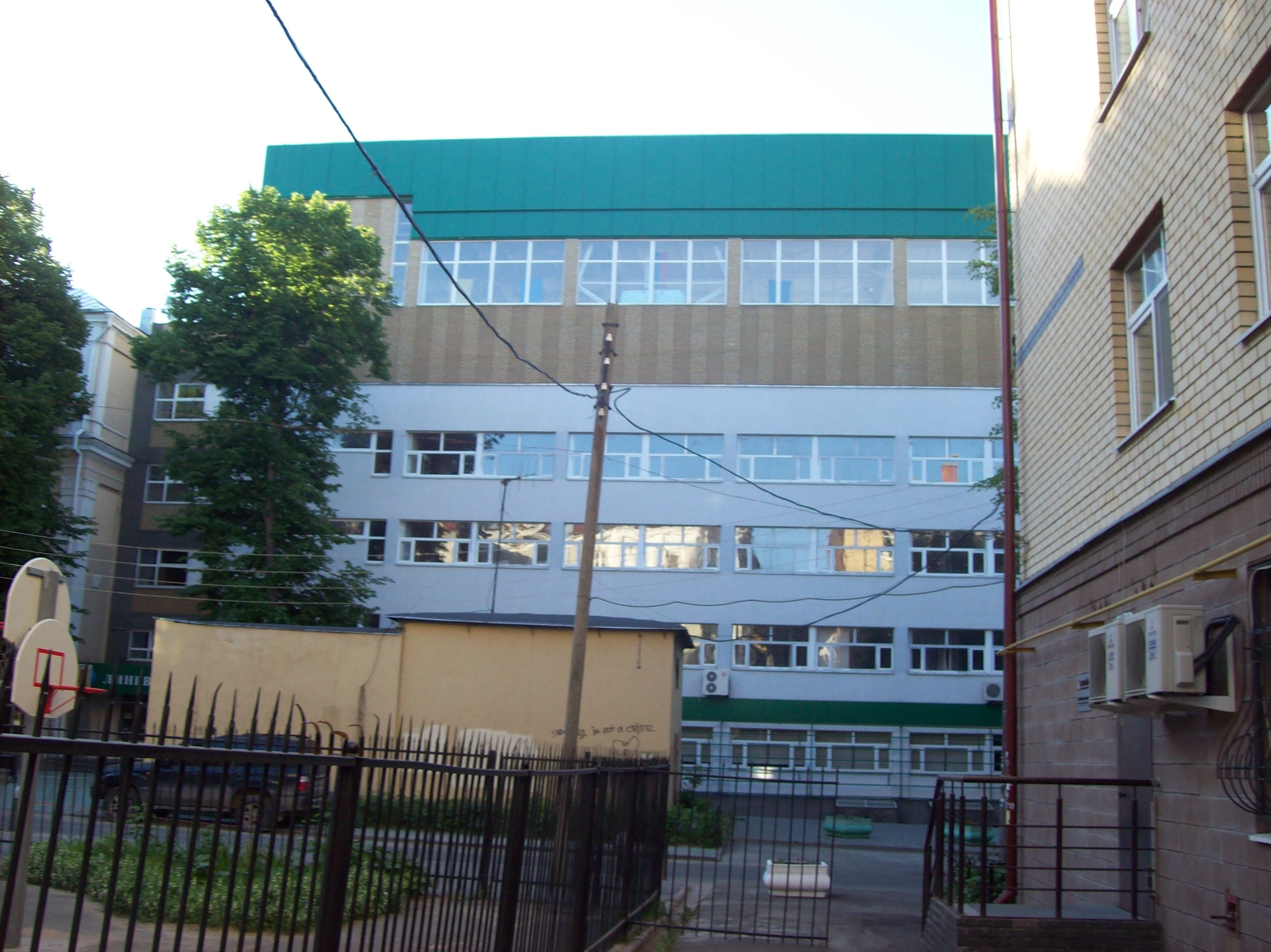

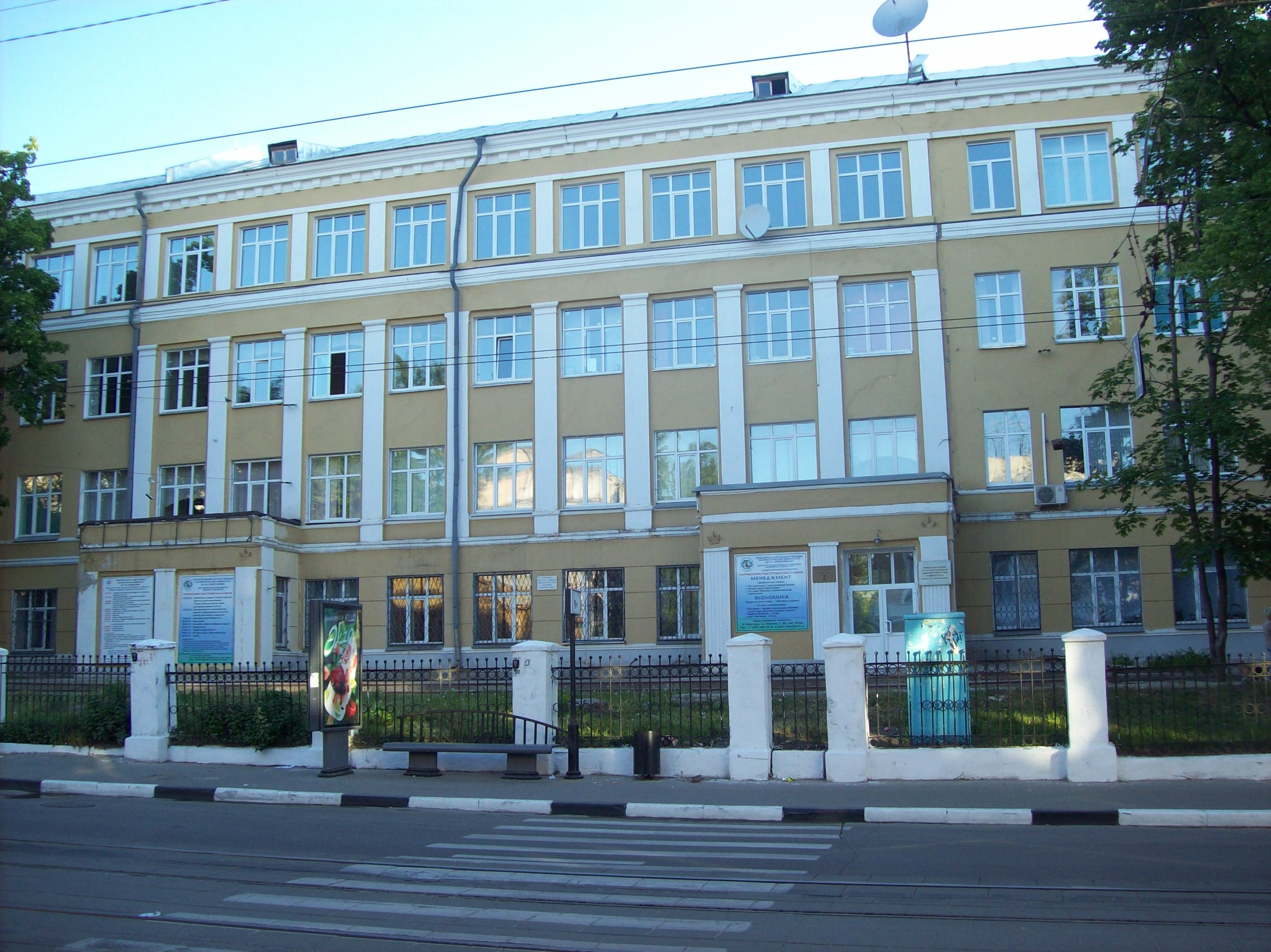

== See also ==
- List of modern universities in Europe (1801–1945)
- List of institutions of higher education in Russia
