= Arlo =

Name list

- Gender: Unisex
- Language: Old English (Anglo Saxon)

Arlo (pronounced /ˈɑːɹ.loʊ/) is a unisex given name. It was first used by Edmund Spenser, who "evidently invented" it, as the name of a hill where the gods debate in his poem The Faerie Queene (1590 and 1596).

Although originally a male name, 2018 Yahoo! UK article indicated an increasing popularity of "Arlo" as a girls' name in England and Wales.

== People ==
=== Arts and sciences ===
- Arlo Bates (1850–1918), American author, educator and newspaperman
- Arlo Gilliam (born 1977), American singer-songwriter and record producer
- Arlo Guthrie (born 1947), American folk singer
- Arlo Haskell, historian, poet, literary organizer, and publisher
- Arlo Hemphill (born 1971), American explorer, ocean conservationist and film actor
- Arlo U. Landolt (1935–2022), American astronomer
- Arlo Parks (born 2000), British musician
- Arlo West (born 1958), American singer/songwriter
- Arlo McKinley

=== Military ===
- Arlo L. Olson (1918–1943), American military officer and recipient of the Medal of Honor

=== Politics ===
- Arlo Hullinger (1921–2021), American politician
- Arlo Looking Cloud (born 1954), Native American activist
- Arlo Schmidt (1931-2022), American politician
- Arlo Smith, District Attorney of San Francisco, California, during 1980–1996

=== Sports ===
- Arlo Brunsberg (born 1940), former professional baseball player
- Arlo Chavez (born 1966), Filipino boxer who has competed at the 1992 Summer Olympics
- Arlo Eisenberg (born 1973), American aggressive inline skater
- Arlo White (born 1973), English sports commentator

== Fictional characters ==
=== Television ===
- Arlo Beauregard, in the 2021 Netflix animated series I Heart Arlo, voiced by Michael J. Woodard
- Arlo Davenport, on the British soap opera Hollyoaks
- Arlo Dean, on the British soap opera Family Affairs
- Arlo Givens, on the television series Justified, portrayed by Raymond J. Barry
- Arlo Glass, on the 8th season of the television series 24

=== Films ===
- Arlo Pear, in the 1988 comedy film Moving, portrayed by Richard Pryor
- Arlo, in the 2002 comedy film Orange County, played by Kyle Howard
- Arlo, a young green Apatosaurus and the main character in the 2015 Disney/Pixar animated film The Good Dinosaur
- Arlo Beauregard, the lead titular character in the 2021 Netflix film Arlo the Alligator Boy, voiced by Michael J. Woodard

=== Comics ===
- one of the titular characters of Arlo and Janis, an American comic strip
