= Key West Literary Seminar =

Annual writers' conference

Coordinates: 24.5591°N 81.7934°W

The Key West Literary Seminar is a writers' conference and festival held each January in Key West, Florida. It draws an international audience for readings, panel discussions, and workshops.

== History ==
The seminar was founded in 1983 by David Kaufelt and his wife Lynn Kaufelt, as a program operated by the Council for Florida Libraries. The inaugural event, known as the Key West Literary Tour and Seminar, consisted of readings, panel discussions, literary walking tours, and cocktail parties. This basic format remains unchanged. The current executive director is poet, writer and publisher Arlo Haskell.

In its early years, the seminar focused on the literary history of Key West, a small subtropical town which has been home to Ernest Hemingway, Elizabeth Bishop, Wallace Stevens, Robert Frost, and Tennessee Williams, among others. Subsequent Seminars have been devoted to broader genres or literary themes.

In 1987, the seminar incorporated as a 501(c)(3) tax-exempt corporation, run by a board of directors, with Lynn Kaufelt named as the executive director. In 1988, Monica Haskell became executive director. She was succeeded by Miles Frieden in 1995. Many well-known authors have served on the seminar's board of directors, including Judy Blume, Harry Mathews, James Gleick, William Wright, Richard Wilbur, and John Malcolm Brinnin. An honorary board of directors has included popular singer Jimmy Buffett, former First Lady Barbara Bush, and writers Annie Dillard, Robert Stone, Alison Lurie, and Joy Williams.

The seminar was formerly held at the Tennessee Williams Fine Arts Center at Florida Keys Community College on Stock Island. Since 1993, events have been held on Duval Street at the San Carlos Institute, a historic building whose construction was partly funded by the Republic of Cuba during the 1920s. The seminar begins each year with the John Hersey Memorial Address and features a series of receptions at notable Key West locations.

Through their website, the seminar offers audio recordings of past events, biographies of past and forthcoming speakers, and information about Key West's literary history.

The seminar went on hiatus in 2021.

Key West Literary Seminar themes by year:

- 1983: Key West Literary Tour and Seminar
- 1984: Key West Literary Tour and Seminar
- 1985: Hemingway: A Moveable Feast
- 1986: Tennessee Williams in Key West
- 1987: Writers & Key West
- 1988: Whodunit? The Art & Tradition of Mystery Literature
- 1989: The American Short Story: A Renaissance
- 1990: New Directions in American Theatre
- 1991: Literature of Travel: A Sense of Place
- 1992: Literature and Film
- 1993: Poetry of Elizabeth Bishop
- 1994: Biography and Autobiography
- 1995: Journalism
- 1996: American Writers and The Natural World
- 1997: Literature in the Age of AIDS
- 1998: Once Upon A Time: Children's Literature in the Late 20th Century
- 1999: The American Novel
- 2000: The Memoir
- 2001: Science and Literature: Narratives of Discovery
- 2002: Spirit of Place
- 2003: The Beautiful Changes: Poetry
- 2004: Crossing Borders: The Immigrant Voice in American Literature
- 2005: Humor
- 2006: The Literature of Adventure, Travel, and Discovery
- 2007: Wondrous Strange: Mystery, Intrigue, and Psychological Drama
- 2008: New Voices: Where Have We Been? Where Are We Going?
- 2009: Historical Fiction and The Search for Truth
- 2010: Clearing the Sill of the World: 60 Years of American Poetry
- 2011: The Hungry Muse: an exploration of food in literature
- 2012: Yet Another World: Literature of the Future
- 2013: Writers on Writers
- 2014: The Dark Side: Mystery, Crime, and the Literary Thriller
- 2015: How the Light Gets In: Literature of the Spirit
- 2016: Shorts: Stories, Essays, and Other Briefs
- 2017: Revealing Power: The Literature of Politics
- 2018: Writers of the Caribbean
- 2019: Under the Influence: Archetype & Adaptation from Homer to the Multiplex
- 2020: Reading Between the Lines: Sport & Literature
- 2022: A Seminar Named Desire (planned)

== See also ==
- Florida literature
- List of writers' conferences
