= Goombay Festival =

Goombay Festival may refer to:

- Goombay Festival, held in Coconut Grove, Florida
- Fantasy Fest, held in Key West, Florida

== See also ==
- Goombay, a genre of Bahamian music
