= Fogarty Mansion (Fogarty House) =

Coordinates: 24.55838°N 81.80437°W

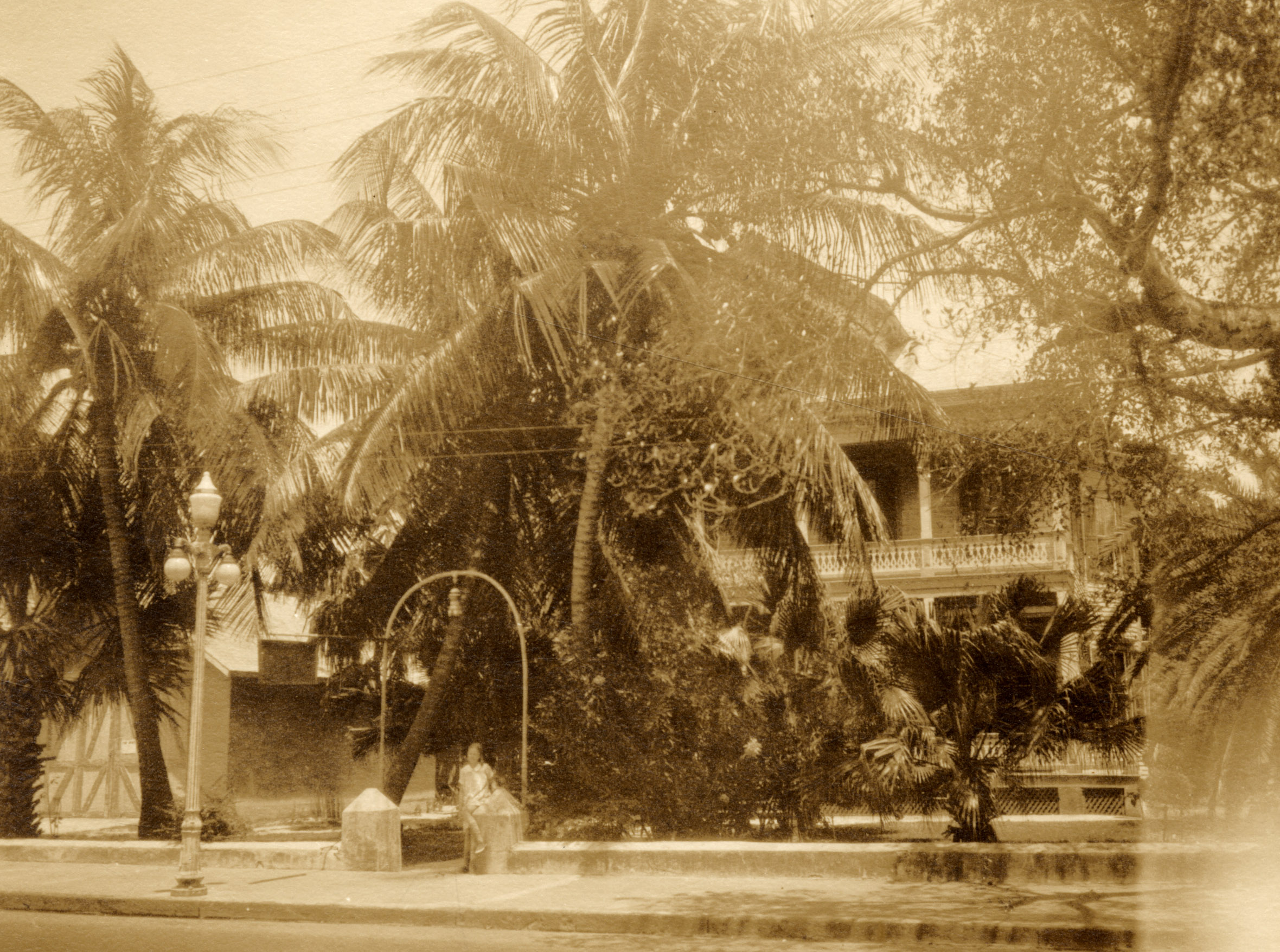
Fogarty House, 1930s

The Fogarty Mansion is a historic home in Key West, Florida, United States. It is located at 227 Duval Street and is denoted by Key West Historic Marker 18.

== History ==
=== Construction ===
The home was first built in 1875 by Charles Curry. This original structure was destroyed in the 1886 fire in Key West, and was rebuilt as the current structure in 1887. Charles Curry was the son of William Curry, and the home is typical of the mansions built by Curry children, such as the Southernmost Mansion built by Florida Curry.

=== Namesake ===
After Charles’ death, the house was purchased for his daughter Corinne by her husband Dr. Joseph Norman Fogarty as a wedding present in 1900.

Dr. Fogarty, for whom the house is now known, was mayor of Key West when the Overseas Railroad linked the island to the Florida mainland for the first time in 1912. He held office for six years. He was a prominent and wealthy member of the Key West community who used his property to host a number of important events. In January 1912, he held a large reception for Henry Flagler to celebrate the completion of Flagler’s Overseas Railroad. In December of that year, he held a reception for William Howard Taft, who stopped in Key West on his way to inspect the Panama Canal. Grover Cleveland was also entertained at the Fogarty house.

== Current Usage ==
After the Fogartys passed, the house fell into disrepair. In 1971, it was purchased by John and Dolly Dedek, who turned it into the Fogarty House 1875 Restaurant.

Today, the house is the site of Fogarty’s Restaurant and Flying Monkeys Saloon. The Flying Monkeys Saloon is the site of an original piece by late Key West artist Captain Outrageous.
