= Michael Sumpter =

Deceased American serial killer and rapist

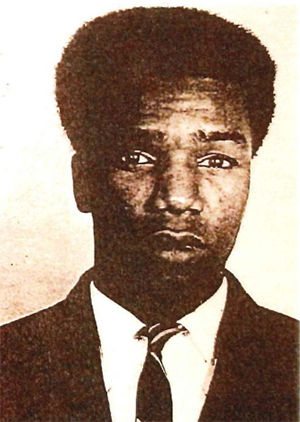
- 1968 prison ID photo
- Born: Michael Eugene Sumpter; September 26, 1947; Boston, Massachusetts, U.S.
- Died: August 10, 2001 (aged 53); Lemuel Shattuck Hospital Correctional Unit, Boston, Massachusetts, U.S.
- Convictions: Rape (2 counts); Assault; Battery
- Penalty: 21–30 years imprisonment

Details
- Victims: 3
- Span of crimes: 1969–1973
- Country: United States
- State: Massachusetts
- Date apprehended: For the final time on December 19, 1973

Michael Eugene Sumpter (September 26, 1947 – August 10, 2001) was an American serial killer who raped and strangled three women in the Greater Boston area from 1969 to 1973. Because Sumpter died before his DNA was matched to the rapes and murders, he was never tried for or convicted of these crimes.

== Crimes ==
Sumpter's first recorded crime occurred at age 19, when he was arrested for a purse snatching on November 27, 1965, on Washington Street, Boston. For this incident, he received a short prison term, which he served at MCI-Concord.

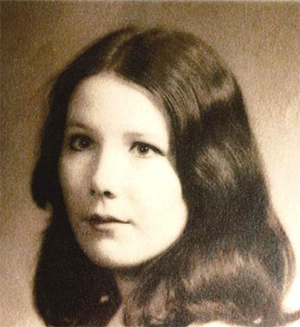
Jane Britton, Sumpter's first known victim

After his release, Sumpter continued to commit criminal acts, which gradually escalated into rapes and murders. His first known serious crimes occurred on January 7, 1969, when he raped and murdered 23-year-old Harvard University graduate student Jane Britton in Cambridge. The daughter of the then-administrator of Radcliffe College, she was last seen in her apartment on 6 University Road after being visited by her 27-year-old friend, James Humphries. After she failed to attend classes the following day, Humphries and Britton's next door neighbors, Donald and Jill Mitchell, checked on her, eventually entering the apartment after she failed to answer the door. They then found Britton lying facedown on her blood-soaked mattress, clad only in her nightgown. Police were immediately called to investigate, with a forensic autopsy determining that Britton had been raped and killed with a sharp instrument; the exact murder weapon was never identified. Sumpter had presumably accessed Britton's apartment by climbing the fire escape and entering through an open window, when he then attacked the unsuspecting woman. Several factors in the case, including Britton's social status, the similarity to the 1963 murder of 26-year-old Beverly Samans attributed to the Boston Strangler, and the contemporary suspicion that it was committed by someone who knew Britton led to the case gaining notoriety in the area, but despite extensive investigations and media coverage no suspect could be identified at the time.

Sumpter's next victim was 24-year-old Ellen Faith Rutchick, a native of Saint Paul, Minnesota who worked as a secretary at the Colonnade Hotel. On the night of January 5, 1972, Sumpter entered her apartment in Back Bay and attacked her, strangling Rutchick with a stereo speaker cord. He then removed some of her clothing and left the body on the sofa before leaving the apartment. Concerned co-workers went to the apartment, found the door slightly ajar, and Rutchick herself dead, wearing only a housecoat and her torn bra. In June of that year, Sumpter was convicted of assault and battery, sentenced to 6–10 years and imprisoned at MCI-Norfolk. On November 20, 1973, he was granted furlough, but failed to return to prison and an arrest warrant was issued for him.

While evading police for his furlough violation, Sumpter wandered towards Beacon Hill, where, on December 12, 1973, he used the fire escape to enter the apartment of 24-year-old secretary Mary Lee McClain. Despite the fact that McClain had two roommates and a male friend present in the apartment, no one saw or heard anything suspicious. The following morning, McClain, wearing only a nightgown, was found asphyxiated to death in her bed. When the authorities were called and questioned the other residents of the apartment block, a female neighbor claimed that she had heard muffled screams coming from McClain's apartment, and moments later, what sounded like someone descending the fire escape. Eight days later, Sumpter was arrested near the Marsh Chapel after he was caught with a stolen purse. He was additionally charged with assault and battery for attacking the arresting officer, and carrying a firearm, which felons are prohibited to possess.

For this, Sumpter was remanded to MCI-Walpole but was later transferred back to MCI-Norfolk. On August 2, 1975, Sumpter was granted work release, ostensibly to attend his job at Quincy Home Furnishings; however, unbeknownst to the authorities the store closed at noon on Saturdays. Using his temporary freedom, Sumpter began searching for a victim in the Back Bay area, eventually coming across a 19-year-old college student to whom he claimed he was the "new neighbor". The woman invited him to her apartment for a glass of water, after which Sumpter went into the bathroom. When he returned, he attacked the student while wearing a pair of rubber surgical gloves, tying up her hands and gagging her with tissue. She was then forced to perform a sexual act upon him before Sumpter raped her and then fled. The victim reported the crime to the police, who presented her with approximately 250 police photos, from which she positively identified Sumpter as her assailant. Shortly thereafter, he was arrested, convicted, and given a 15–20 year sentence, which he was to serve at MCI-Walpole consecutively with his assault and battery sentence.

== Death, investigation and exposure ==
On August 10, 2001, Sumpter, who had been suffering from cancer, died at the Lemuel Shattuck Hospital Correctional Unit. After his death, his DNA was uploaded to CODIS, in an effort to possibly connect him to any unsolved cold cases. In 2005, the investigators had their first hit, when Sumpter's DNA was matched to the 1985 rape of a woman in Back Bay, likely committed when he was allowed out on another furlough. Encouraged by their findings, cold case units continued with their research. On February 28, 2010, Boston police announced that they had connected him to Rutchick's murder.

Two years later, on October 19, 2012, authorities announced another positive match, this time with the murder of McClain in 1973. In 2018, he was linked to the Britton murder after his brother provided a DNA sample which upon analysis excluded more than 99.92 percent of the male population. His identification dispelled most of the theories surrounding the case, as until then, it was thought that Britton had been killed by someone acquainted with her.

== See also ==
- Boston Strangler
- List of serial killers in the United States
