= Great Fire of Key West =

1886 conflagration in Florida, United States

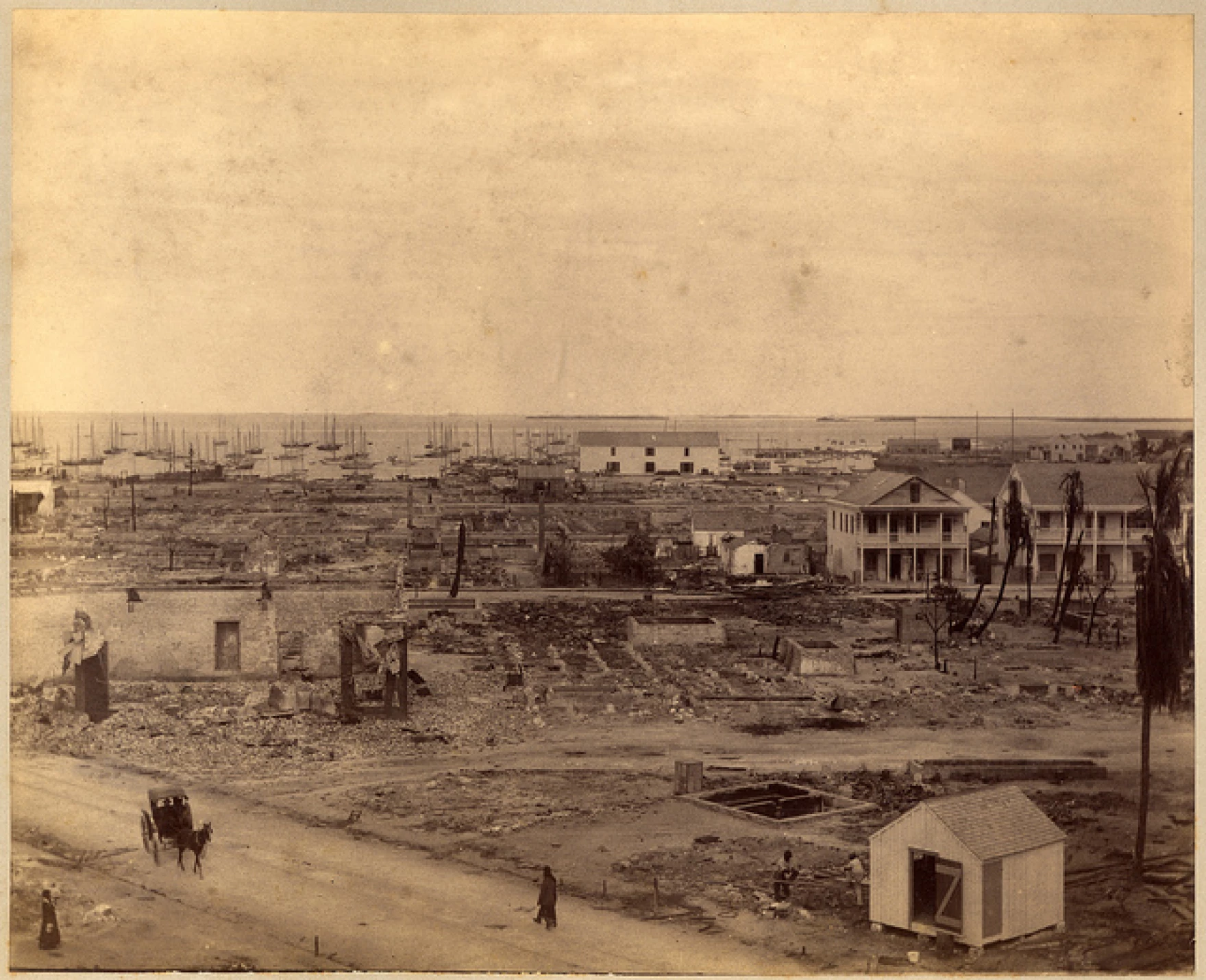
- Picture of the few remaining buildings left in a Key West neighborhood after the fire
- Date: March 30, 1886, 10:00 am – 10:00 pm
- Location: Key West, Florida, U.S.
- Deaths: 7
- Injuries: 15
- Property damage: 50 acres, $1.5 million

The Great Fire of Key West was a major fire that destroyed a significant portion of the city of Key West in 1886. It was the largest and most devastating fire in Key West history.

The fire began in a coffee shop next to the San Carlos Institute. It burned for 12 hours over 50 acres (20 ha), destroyed most of the commercial area of the city, killed seven people, injured 15 more, and cost $1.5 million ($53.8 million in 2025) in property damage.

== Compounding factors ==
There were several compounding factors that caused the fire to burn for so long and destroy so much of the city.

Since 1875, the city had a serious fire department, organized first by A. H. Dorsett. However, at the time of the fire, the city's only steam fire engine had been sent to New York for repair. Firefighters were only able to use less effective measures like hand pumpers.

Secondly, on the night when the fire occurred, strong winds were blowing, which caused the fire to start up again even where it appeared to have been put out.

== Arson speculation ==
There is speculation that the fire was started on purpose by arsonists sent by the Spanish empire attempting to undermine Key West citizens' support for Cuban independence. This stems from three key details of the fire. The fire was started immediately next to the San Carlos Institute, which was the heart of Cuban culture in Key West. The increased pay that Cuban emigrants found in Key West was a source of direct financial contributions to the Cuban revolution. Secondly, the morning after the fire, there was a Spanish ram waiting to take on any unemployed Cuban cigar workers who wanted to return to Cuba. 400 workers returned at that time. Thirdly, Havana newspapers reportedly ran an article describing the great fire the day before it actually took place.

== Buildings destroyed ==
Notable buildings destroyed by the great fire include the San Carlos Institute, City Hall, St. Paul's Church, Fire House No. 1, the Fogarty Mansion, the Patterson House, and the Key West Custom House. Because the blaze occurred in the heart of the island's business district, many cigar factories and sponge warehouses burned down, putting four thousand employees out of work.

== Aftermath ==
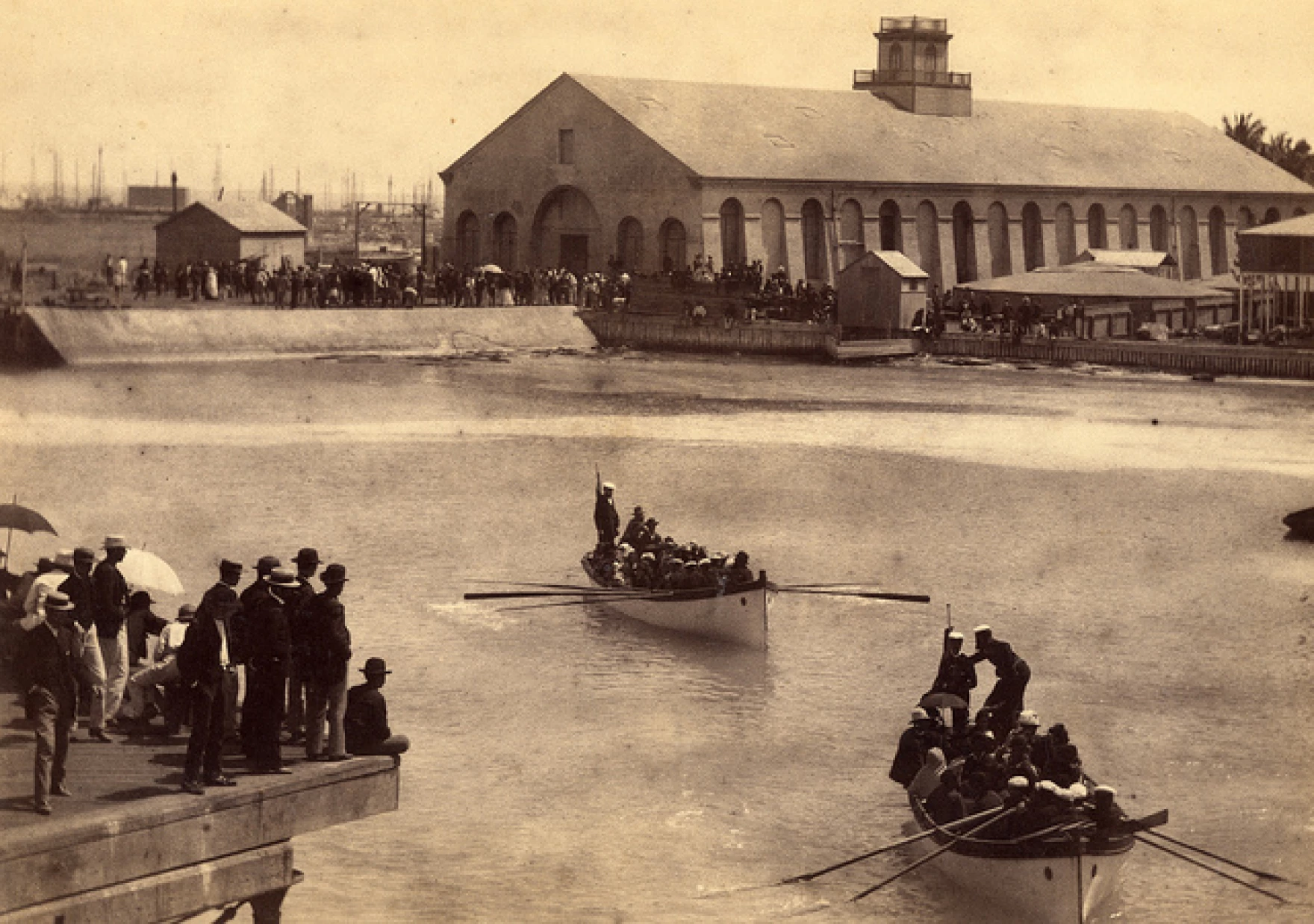
Cuban workers leaving Key West by Spanish ships after the fire of April 1886.

William Curry was chairman of the Relief Committee created to rebuild the city after the fire. On April 4, he publicly requested aid from US Citizens: "A large portion of our city having been swept away by the flames, our industrial occupations entirely ruined, and thousands of our people left in other destitution and distress, we found ourselves compelled to appeal to the benevolence of our country..."

The local fire department took measures to better prepare for such a massive fire in the future. They purchased two new steam engines, rebuilt the firehouse, and built several new firehouses across town over the next several years.

Within two years, the city had a waterworks system to bring in salt water in case of fire. The city also became home to a privately owned telegraph fire alarm system.

Buildings reconstructed after the fire often used wood, which is unusual for communities that have experienced such a massive fire event. The motivations for this appear to be economic: lumber was readily available in Key West due to the wrecking business. The wood used most often in wealthy homes was Dade County pine, which had high resistance to termites. However, many buildings destroyed in the fire (such as Fire House No. 1) were rebuilt with red brick.
