= Becky Cooper =

American author

- Born: Rebecca A. Cooper; Queens, New York, U.S.
- Education: Harvard University
- Occupation: Author
- Writing career
- Language: English
- Notable works: Mapping Manhattan (2013); We Keep the Dead Close (2020)
- Notable awards: Hoopes Prize (2011)

Becky Cooper is an American author best known for her nonfiction book We Keep the Dead Close (2020), an account of the long-unsolved murder of a Harvard graduate student in 1969.

== Education ==
Cooper graduated from Harvard University off-cycle in the winter of 2010 as part of the class of 2011, with an A.B. in comparative literature. Her undergraduate thesis, "Quo Vadis? The Life and Literary Philosophy of David Foster Wallace," won Harvard's $4,000 Hoopes Prize, awarded annually for outstanding scholarly work or research by students. Cooper was later a senior fellow at Brandeis University's Schuster Institute for Investigative Journalism.

== Career ==
Before becoming an author, Cooper worked as a research assistant, helped make a documentary about giving socks to homeless youth, and traveled to France for a job as a paralegal. After returning to the U.S., she became a member of The New Yorker′s editorial staff, where she contributed 19 restaurant and bar reviews to the "Goings On About Town" section published between July 2015 and May 2017, and served as assistant to the magazine's editor, David Remnick. In April 2017, she left The New Yorker to focus full time on researching an unsolved murder that had intrigued her since 2009. After embarking on a two-week archeological dig in Bulgaria (the murder victim being a Harvard graduate student of archaeology), Cooper took up residence on Harvard's campus and began writing a book about the case.

== Books ==
Cooper's first book, Mapping Manhattan: A Love (and Sometimes Hate) Story in Maps by 75 New Yorkers (2013), recounts her journey walking the length of Broadway, and includes 75 maps from both anonymous mapmakers and notable New Yorkers such as The New York Times wine critic Eric Asimov and Tony Award-winning actor Harvey Fierstein. The book grew out of a collaborative art project, for which Cooper created a Tumblr blog in 2009 that invited strangers to fill out a blank map of Manhattan with their own memories and submit it for consideration.

Cooper's second book, We Keep the Dead Close: A Murder at Harvard and a Half Century of Silence (2020), is the true story of Jane Britton, a graduate student of Near Eastern archaeology in Harvard's anthropology department who, at age 23 in 1969, was bludgeoned to death in her off-campus apartment in Cambridge, Massachusetts. The title is taken from a talk by a Harvard professor, rumored to be involved in the case, who said of a prehistoric culture that buried the dead under their houses, "The dead are kept close to you." Cooper was struck by the ambiguity of keeping human remains close as suggesting either respectful remembrance or attempted cover-up. In completing this work, she received support from the Fund for Investigative Journalism, the International Women's Media Foundation's Howard G. Buffett Fund for Women Journalists, and the Freelance Investigative Reporters and Editors Program.
