= Murder of Faith Hedgepeth =

2012 murder of a college student in North Carolina

- Faith Hedgepeth
- Date: September 7, 2012
- Time: Between 4:25 and 11:00 a.m.
- Location: Chapel Hill, North Carolina, US; 35.94128°N 79.00266°W
- Cause: Blunt-force trauma
- Perpetrator: Miguel Salguero-Olivares
- Burial: Warrenton, North Carolina

On September 7, 2012, Faith Hedgepeth (born September 26, 1992), an undergraduate student in her second year at the University of North Carolina at Chapel Hill (UNC), was found deceased in her apartment in Chapel Hill. She was known to be alive much earlier that morning, when she went to bed after returning from a local nightclub with her roommate.

Police recovered considerable forensic evidence in the case. Hedgepeth had been beaten over the head with a blunt instrument, later found to be an empty liquor bottle. Evidence of semen and male DNA was present at the crime scene. DNA evidence eliminated one suspect, her roommate's former boyfriend, who was said to have expressed anger and resentment toward Hedgepeth, even supposedly threatening to kill her if he could not reunite with her roommate. A note left at the scene, suggesting the writer was jealous, is believed to have been written by the killer; it was among a large group of documents released by police two years after the crime, following a court action brought by several local media outlets.

Four years after the killing, a Virginia DNA testing company released (at police's behest) an image showing what the suspect might look like based on his genetic phenotype. A voicemail, possibly accidentally recorded by Hedgepeth, may have captured some of the events that led to her death.

In September 2021, the Chapel Hill Police Department announced an arrest in the case. The suspect, Miguel Salguero-Olivares, was linked to the case through DNA evidence after a drunken-driving arrest the month before. Olivares was convicted and sentenced to life without parole in October 2026.

== Background ==
Faith Hedgepeth was born in 1992 in Warren County. She was a member of the Haliwa-Saponi Native American tribe recognized by North Carolina, and Warren County is part of the tribe's traditional territory. Her parents divorced within a year of her birth, and she was raised by her mother, Connie, with help from an older sister, in Hollister and Warrenton. Connie Hedgepeth had named her second daughter Faith because she believed that was what she needed to raise a fourth child.

In high school, Hedgepeth was an honor student, a cheerleader and a member of many extracurricular organizations. She earned a Gates Millennium Scholarship to attend the University of North Carolina at Chapel Hill. Faith hoped to be the first in her family to graduate from college. (Her father had attended UNC-CH as well, but he did not graduate.) She was considering further studies to become a pediatrician or teacher.

After two years attending the university, she took a hiatus for the spring 2012 semester. She remained in the Chapel Hill area over the summer, living in an off-campus apartment at the Hawthorne at the View complex between Chapel Hill and Durham, on the line between Durham and Orange counties, during the month of August. She planned to move to another apartment after her financial aid for the fall semester was made available to her. She shared the apartment with Karena Rosario, with whom she had been friends since her freshman year, and Rosario's boyfriend, Eriq Takoy Jones.

Jones and Rosario's relationship had been marked by domestic violence, and eventually she ended it. He moved out of the apartment, but in early July 2012, he attempted to break into the apartment twice, even after Rosario changed the locks. Hedgepeth eventually drove Rosario to court to get a protective order that required Jones to stay away from the apartment. Jones reportedly resented Hedgepeth's influence over his former girlfriend, and at one point reportedly threatened during a phone conversation with Hedgepeth to kill her if he could not restore his relationship with Rosario.

== Murder ==
The evening of September 6, 2012, a Thursday, began at 5:45 p.m. with Hedgepeth attending a sorority rush event for the campus chapter of Alpha Pi Omega, a historically Native American sorority she hoped to join. At 7:15 she left, saying she had to work on a paper she was writing about the history of her tribe. She and Rosario went to the university's Davis Library to study together at 8:00 p.m. Between 8:30 and 9:00 she exchanged texts with her father about the sorority.

Hedgepeth left Rosario there briefly and returned around 11:30, after which they returned to their apartment together, arriving there around midnight. A half-hour later they left again, heading for The Thrill, a nightclub in downtown Chapel Hill which admitted customers under the legal drinking age of 21 to dance. (The establishment has since gone out of business.) The two young women arrived at The Thrill around 12:40 a.m. Rosario told police later that, after almost an hour and a half of dancing, she suffered an upset stomach and wanted to leave. Security cameras at the club show her and Hedgepeth leaving at 2:06 a.m.; it is the last visual record of her presence anywhere before the killing.

By 3 a.m., Hedgepeth and Rosario had returned to their apartment. A woman who lived below the two and was awake watching television said that she heard three thumping noises, which she described as similar to a heavy bag being dropped or furniture being overturned, shortly afterward. Hedgepeth's Facebook page was also accessed around the same time.

At 3:40 a.m., a text message was sent from Hedgepeth's phone to that of Brandon Edwards, a former boyfriend of Rosario, saying "Hey b. Can you come over here please. Rosario needs you more aha. You know. Please let her know you care." Three minutes later, another text was sent from Hedgepeth's phone to Edwards's phone with the single word "than," believed to be a correction for the "aha" in the previous text. That was the last evidence of activity from Hedgepeth's phone. At 4:16 a.m., Edwards sent a return text, asking who had sent the previous text.

Rosario's phone records show she was also trying to call Edwards around the same time. When he did not answer, she tried to call Jordan McCrary, a soccer player for their school. At 4:25 a.m., she left the apartment and entered McCrary's car. At that time, Rosario said later, she believed Hedgepeth was asleep in her room, and she left the apartment's door unlocked.

McCrary drove Rosario to the home of another acquaintance on West Longview Street in Chapel Hill. She put the time of her arrival there at around 4:30 a.m. After spending the rest of the night and the early morning there, a short time after 10:30 she began trying to arrange a ride home. After attempting to reach Hedgepeth, who did not answer, Rosario called another friend, Marisol Rangel, who came and took her back to her apartment.

When they arrived there shortly before 11 a.m., they entered and called for Hedgepeth, who did not respond. In her bedroom, they found her bloodied body, wrapped in a quilt, partially nude. They immediately dialed 9-1-1 and informed police.

== Investigation ==
Details of the investigation were not discussed publicly at first, a deviation from the Chapel Hill police's usual practice. The town obtained a court order sealing all records as they were collected. Police collected semen from the scene and used it to develop a DNA profile; it was consistent with male DNA found elsewhere in the apartment. The autopsy determined that Hedgepeth had died from blunt force trauma to the head, likely a result of being hit by an empty rum bottle in the apartment.

Jones seemed to be a very strong suspect from the beginning. Police learned of his history of domestic violence and his threat against Hedgepeth. They also found that the night before, around 6 p.m., he had texted an acquaintance asking for forgiveness "for what I am about to do" and then posted the same message on his Twitter feed. Three days later, he changed the banner on his Facebook page to read "Dear Lord, Forgive me for all of my sins and the sins I may commit today. Protect me from the girls who don't deserve me and the ones who wish me dead today."

Police sought a DNA sample from Jones, whom they considered a person of interest. After some initial resistance, he complied. His DNA did not match the sample from the apartment, and they excluded him as a suspect. DNA from Edwards and many other men whom police found had been at The Thrill during the same time as Rosario and Hedgepeth was also tested, with the same result.

Within days the university's board of trustees, the local Crime Stoppers chapter, the Haliwa-Saponi tribe, and the apartment complex had offered a combined $29,000 in reward money for information leading to an arrest. Police hoped the reward money would lead to a quick resolution of the case, as their resources were limited. In the 2008 murder of Eve Carson, who at the time was UNC-CH's undergraduate student body president, a $25,000 reward had led to the killers' arrest. Two months later, the office of Governor Bev Perdue added another $10,000 to the reward for Hedgepeth's killer.

=== Seal on case records ===
In November, The Daily Tar Heel, UNC-CH's student newspaper, petitioned the judge who had ordered the investigation records sealed to release an early search warrant in the case. Instead, the judge ordered it resealed for another 45 days. At that time, the Chapel Hill police had not even released Hedgepeth's cause of death, although her parents told the media that their daughter's death certificate said she had been beaten.

Police announced in January that the DNA from the scene had come back as belonging to a male. From the crime scene and other evidence the Federal Bureau of Investigation (FBI) had developed a profile of the man. They said it was likely that he had lived near Hedgepeth in the past, had expressed an interest in her and his behavior may have changed since the crime, including showing an unusual interest in the case. Notwithstanding this release of information, the town successfully petitioned the court to keep the warrants under seal, saying that phase of the investigation was still not complete; in May 2013 the court extended the seal another 60 days.

In September 2013, a year after the killing, Chapel Hill police formally requested the assistance of the North Carolina State Bureau of Investigation, which had provided some help earlier in the investigation, with the case. "We're working the case hard, and we've used all the possible resources," said Chief Chris Blue. However, he would not share any more information about the case.

Two months later, the Tar Heel noted that the Hedgepeth case remained open, along with the death case of David Shannon, a UNC-CH freshman whose body had been found on the grounds of a Carrboro cement plant the previous October 27 (while he had died from a fall, the autopsy found he was severely intoxicated, and the Carrboro police suspected hazing and believed there might be other students who could tell them more about the circumstances of Shannon's death). In Hedgepeth's case, there had been no new information about a possible suspect since January. Yet the case records remained under court-ordered seal.

In March 2014 the Tar Heel was joined by the Raleigh News & Observer and Capitol Broadcasting Company, which owns three television and radio stations in the Research Triangle area, in opposing the district attorney's motion to extend the seal another 60 days. They argued that the order was not justified by a compelling interest on the state's part, and that some of the orders had been issued before the records covered by them had been created, meaning the argument for sealing them was speculative. During a hearing on the motion, the district attorney filed a more specific accounting of what investigative work had been done, allowing the media to report for the first time on what police had searched in the immediate aftermath of the crime. "Eighteen months goes by and no one's been charged and no one's been arrested," said a lawyer for the Tar Heel. "The public has the right to assume the trail has gone cold, or it's not being investigated in a diligent manner." In response, the district attorney's office argued that releasing the detailed records at that point would definitely hinder the investigation, and the records remained under seal.

==== Criticism of seal ====
The following month, Chelsea Dulaney, a reporter who had originally covered the case at the Tar Heel, wrote an article on the Atavist platform taking a skeptical look at the sealing of the case. She speculated that the seal's real purpose was to conceal early missteps by the Chapel Hill police, who might also not have been competent enough to handle the investigation by themselves. The town's court filings, she noted, revealed that after the first two months of the investigation no new search warrants had been sought. "We have to ask, how hot is it?" asked one of the lawyers representing the media.

Dulaney talked to the residents of the apartments at Hawthorne at the View who lived near Hedgepeth and Rosario. They told her that during the preceding summer, they strongly suspected the domestic violence later reported between Rosario and Jones; they thought the police presence on the day the body was found was related to that until they learned otherwise.

Two of the neighbors told Dulaney that while the police sealed off the four-unit block where Hedgepeth and Rosario lived with crime scene tape, they only searched the women's apartment and not any of the others in it. Nor did they search the woods behind the apartments, and they only returned later to search one other apartment in the complex. They did not seem to canvass the area either, never knocking on doors and asking residents what they might have seen. The police also left Hedgepeth's car unsecured while they searched the apartments.

When North Carolina State Bureau of Investigation officers began investigating the case late in 2013, they also interviewed residents of Hawthorne at the View. One resident who spoke to Dulaney said it was clear to her that the SBI investigators were better trained than their Chapel Hill counterparts had been. The agent who interviewed her asked questions that elicited more useful information from her, she recalled.

In downtown Chapel Hill, Dulaney talked to the owner of a towing service who had the contract for the Thrill's parking lot. He had set up a system of security cameras to monitor activity in the club's parking lot that might have possibly recorded anything that happened outside of the club involving Hedgepeth and Rosario while they were there that morning, or after they left. The police did not ask to see it until shortly before Dulaney wrote the article, almost 19 months after the crime. By that time, he told her, any footage from that night had been long since recorded over.

==== Release of records ====
The court ordered the records unsealed in July 2014. Media organizations were able to review and report on the search warrant applications and the investigative notes that had supported them, with most names redacted, for not only the residences and cars but Hedgepeth's phone, computer, Facebook records and bank account. Also released was the transcript of Rosario's 9-1-1 call, and the content of the early-morning text messages as well as the timeline of Rosario and Hedgepeth's actions the night before the body was found.

In September 2014, almost two years after Hedgepeth's death, the autopsy report was released. It confirmed what was on her death certificate, that she had died of blunt force trauma to the head. She had numerous cuts and bruises as well as blood under her fingernails, suggesting she had struggled with her killer. The DNA taken from the semen was matched to DNA elsewhere at the scene.

== Evidence ==
The released records included the recording of Rosario's 9-1-1 call and two pieces of evidence that were seen as potentially helpful in narrowing down the killer's identity. The DNA profile was also used later to generate an image of the potential suspect. "Investigators have excellent evidence in this case," Chief Blue said when the documents were released. "This is not a cold case. It has been and remains an active investigation."

=== 9-1-1 call ===
News & Observer reporter Tom Gasparoli, who covered the case extensively for his newspaper, has also devoted most of his own blog to pondering the evidence and keeping the case alive. To him, Rosario's call raised many questions. "To me, the whole call reeks of unusual," he wrote in 2017 on the case's fifth anniversary.

Gasparoli raised the possibility that Rosario's friend Marisol Rangel, whose voice sounds to him more like the constantly sobbing caller, was the real caller, only later identifying herself as Rosario after repeated requests from the dispatcher for her name. And if it was Rosario, she never mentions that Rangel accompanied her to the apartment. The caller also does not mention Hedgepeth's name in a call that lasts nearly eight minutes, only describing the body she has come upon as "her friend."

And why, Gasparoli asked, does the caller seem reluctant to touch Hedgepeth's body despite repeated pleas from the dispatcher to at least see if she is still breathing? If Rosario was not able to bring herself to do so, could she not have asked Rangel to do so? "I have often thought," Gaparoli wrote,"[that] if it was [Rosario], that she didn't call 9-1-1 the moment she first saw [Hedgepeth]."

=== Note left at scene ===
The note found near the body

Among the evidence collected was a note left near Hedgepeth's body with the text:

I'M NOT STUPID
BITCH
JEALOUS

It was sloppily written in ballpoint pen on what was determined to be the torn-off bottom of a white paper bag of the type commonly used for carry-out food. Police believe the bag may have come from Time-Out, a popular 24-hour restaurant in Chapel Hill that would have been the only place open at the time Hedgepeth and Rosario left The Thrill. It uses such bags and is a short distance away from the nightclub.

Investigators have not said whether they have had the handwriting analyzed. The website Crime Watch Daily had an expert, Peggy Walla, look at photos of the note. She noted that it was clean of the blood reportedly found splattered all over the room, suggesting it was written either away from the crime scene or beforehand. The writer may have been using their non-dominant hand in an attempt to disguise their handwriting. Walla believes the writer was particularly agitated, likely to the point of homicidal rage, by being called "stupid."

In his post marking the fifth anniversary of the case, Gasparoli said a law enforcement source he talked to about the case refused to comment on whether the note was "odd" even as the source answered other questions. He elaborates that the words may have been intended to be read in a different order, producing wording that makes more sense ("I'm not jealous ... stupid bitch," for instance). In addition, he theorizes that more than one writer may have been involved, or that not all of it may have been written at the same time.

The word "STUPID" especially looks to Gasparoli as if it might have been written separately from the other words, as it is written much more clearly and off to the side. The swash extending leftward from the counter on the "P" in "STUPID" struck him as unusually distinctive. "[It] looks quite different, much more precise than any other letter in the note," he says. It seems to Gasparoli to suggest a female writer, or at least one calmer and more intelligent than the lettering elsewhere on the note.

Gasparoli questioned in fact what purpose would be served by leaving it there. As a message to Hedgepeth, it made no sense to leave it next to her body if she was dead; if it was written by the killer or killers, it could have been particularly incriminating evidence and they had to be aware of that possibility. It looked to him, in fact, "[a]lmost as if it were a red herring ... left for some other reason than to reflect the real feelings of the killer(s). Left ... to confuse."

=== Conversation accidentally recorded ===
A friend of Hedgepeth's shared with police a long conversation, perhaps inadvertently recorded, when Hedgepeth's phone pocket-dialed them on the night before the murder, that may have some bearing on the case. It consisted of a three-way conversation, three minutes long, between what sounds to be Hedgepeth and a male and female, with music in the background. It was timestamped at 1:23 a.m., when the night's timeline has Hedgepeth at The Thrill.

It was mostly inaudible and of minimal evidentiary value until Crime Watch Daily hired audio expert Arlo West, who specializes in enhancing such recordings. He claimed he heard Hedgepeth crying for help while the female says "I think she's dying" and the male says "Do it anyhow" after a long discussion in which the female seems to get angrier. The male and female use the name "Eriq" and "Rosie" (which is Rosario's nickname), respectively. Hedgepeth's father is convinced what was recorded was of his daughter's death; West agrees.

The website informed the Chapel Hill police of West's findings, and they agreed to consider West's enhanced version and evaluate it. However, due to the time of the message, they do not believe it to be a recording of the killing; the music in the background further suggests it was recorded at The Thrill. Several months later, they added that the metadata associated with the call reinforces this belief.

West, for his part, cites a known software issue with phones like Hedgepeth's that resulted in inaccurate timestamps. He discounts the background sound as being music, since his analysis did not produce any sounds like percussion, a heavy bass or synthesizers. Further, he adds, there are none of the background sounds, like glasses clinking and others talking, that one would associate with a nightclub.

=== Image of suspect generated from DNA profile ===
On a September 23, 2016, episode of the ABC News program 20/20, Chapel Hill police released an image generated by Parabon NanoLabs, a genetic testing company in Reston, Virginia, of what the suspect who left the semen might look like based purely on the phenotype in his DNA profile. Parabon's president told ABC that Snapshot, the program his company used to create the image, "predicts eye color, hair color, skin color, freckling, face morphology and ancestry." The image included a chart listing the probability that the suspect had the traits he was assigned.

According to the image, the suspect was "very strongly Native American and European mixed ancestry or Latino." Most of his genetic markers pointed to Mexican, Colombian and Iberian ancestry, with some other South American and African countries making up the balance. Parabon believed with over 80 percent confidence that the suspect would have a skin tone in the olive range, with very few freckles or none at all and black hair. It did not make any predictions as to his height and weight.

== Theories ==
Chapel Hill police have not said much about how the crime happened despite the September 2021 arrest. In the past they said they do not believe the killing was a mere crime of opportunity by a stranger, and instead it was committed by someone in her social group, likely someone who knew her through UNC-CH. They are certain the killer or killers knew Hedgepeth, and have interviewed 2,000 people, with DNA tests done on 750 of those. They mapped the relations of many of those interviewees with Hedgepeth and each other, and had reportedly narrowed a pool of a thousand possible suspects down to 10. "This is not a cold case. It's never been a cold case," Chief Blue told Gasparoli in 2016.

A year later, Gasparoli said that he believed that the killer was "just outside" Hedgepeth's closest friends and acquaintances. "Good chance this person didn't know [Hedgepeth] or investigators would know who it was," he wrote. They may, however, have been acting out of anger at some grievance she caused to someone closer to her.

Blue declined to answer Gasparoli's question at that time as to whether investigators believed more than one person had been involved. "It's a piece of the puzzle we do not have if we connect the direct physical evidence," Celisa Lehew, who took over the case as the department's new chief investigator in 2016, told the reporter regarding that theory. "There was some knowledge that two people lived there."

Speculation has sometimes focused on Rosario, Hedgepeth's roommate at the time, due to her 9-1-1 call, the last texts sent from Hedgepeth's phone to her former boyfriend suggesting that "[Rosario] needs you more than you know," the woman addressed as "Rosie" on the voicemail conversation and her decision to leave the apartment unlocked with, she claims, a sleeping Hedgepeth inside, to go sleep somewhere else at 4:30 the morning of the killing. Although she has left North Carolina and said very little about the case since then, Gasparoli wrote in 2017 that he learned from his police sources that they still regularly speak with her, and she cooperates. "They do believe there is more Rosario can tell them," he says. "[It] sounds to me like [Rosario] has been in the crosshairs ... as a key figure who knows more than she says she knows."

== Arrest and trial ==
On September 16, 2021, the Chapel Hill Police Department arrested Miguel Salguero-Olivares, 28, of Durham, on a first-degree murder charge in Hedgepeth's death. Salguero-Olivares is originally from Guatemala, and arrived in the United States in 2010, 2 years before Hedgepeth's death. He had not been a suspect originally, but was identified through investigative genetic genealogy. Confirmatory DNA samples were obtained after he had been arrested on a drunken-driving charge in Wake County the preceding month. According to court documents released in January 2022, the DNA found at the scene and the palm print on the murder weapon match Salguero-Olivares. In a statement, the police asked the public to bear with them as they sorted the details out. "This story will take time to completely unfold", said Chief Blue.

In November 2024, it was announced that prosecutors amended the indictment to add charges of first-degree burglary, first-degree rape, and first-degree sexual offense.

On October 23, 2026, Olivares was found guilty of first-degree murder, rape and other charges by a jury. He was sentenced to life in prison without the possibility of parole.

Jurors interviewed by the media afterwards said that they found the state's case most convincing in its forensic aspect, with experts testifying that the DNA and fingerprints found at the scene belonged to Olivares. Some were surprised when his defense, which had pointed to inconsistencies and mishandling of some of that evidence, chose to rest its case instead of calling witnesses or presenting any evidence of its own, after having suggested they would. When deliberations began, some jurors still had doubts. "I was like, I just don't understand. I need more evidence. I'm not understanding the burglary charge and the murder," one said. Eventually they decided that the evidence they would like to have had to consider would not have outweighed the forensics if they had it.

Olivares filed a notice of intent to appeal shortly after his conviction.

== See also ==
- Deaths in September 2012
- List of 2012 murders in the United States
- List of unsolved murders (2000–present)
- Crime in North Carolina
- Sexual victimization of Native American women
- 2015 Chapel Hill shooting, three UNCCH/NCSU students killed in off-campus residence
- Murder of Jane Britton, similar 1969 killing of a Harvard graduate student at her apartment, where police also kept information to themselves and perplexing evidence was found next to the body, attributed in 2018 to a long-dead man via DNA evidence.
