= Murder of Jane Britton =

1969 killing at Harvard solved via DNA in 2018

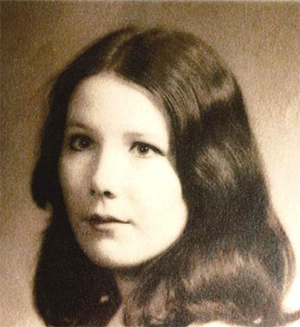
- Date: January 7, 1969
- Time: 12:30–1:30 a.m.
- Location: Cambridge, Massachusetts; 42.3730°N 71.1230°W
- Burial: Needham Cemetery, Needham, Massachusetts
- Coroner: George Katsas
- Suspects: Michael Sumpter

On January 7, 1969, at 12:30 a.m, 23‑year‑old Jane Britton, a graduate student in Near Eastern archaeology at Harvard University, left a neighbor's apartment in Cambridge, Massachusetts, United States, to return to her own. The next day, after she had failed to answer her phone and missed an important exam, her boyfriend went to the apartment and found her dead. The cause of death was found to be blunt force trauma from a blow to the head; she had been raped as well.

The crime attracted national media attention, as Britton's father was an administrator at Radcliffe College, and several factors led to a presumption that Britton's killer had been an acquaintance, perhaps a fellow student or faculty member of Harvard's anthropology department. Her body had been sprinkled with red ochre powder, used in many ancient funerals of multiple civilizations. No valuables had been taken from the apartment, nor had any of her neighbors heard any screams or other unusual noises (although later some were reported).

Investigators were unable to find any likely suspects among the anthropology department. Albert DeSalvo reportedly confessed to raping and murdering another woman who had lived in the same building in 1963, following his arrest as the Boston Strangler several years earlier, but doubts remained as to whether he had committed all the murders linked to the case. Some also considered that there might have been a second Boston Strangler, leading to speculation that, if there was, he might have killed Britton as well. The case went cold but continued to fascinate the media and true crime enthusiasts on the Internet, some of whom fought to have records made public from the investigation in the hope of resolving the case.

Cambridge police and the Middlesex County district attorney's office announced in November 2018, two months before the crime's 50th anniversary, that they had identified a suspect in the case through DNA: Michael Sumpter, who had died in 2001 after being paroled into hospice care from a prison sentence that he was serving for a 1975 rape. It is the oldest cold case that Middlesex County law enforcement has ever solved. The DNA evidence has also linked Sumpter to several other unsolved rapes and murders in the Boston area.

== Jane Britton ==
Jane Britton was born May 17, 1945, the daughter of J. Boyd Britton, administrative vice president of Radcliffe College in Cambridge, a selective women's college that shared ties with Harvard and enjoyed a similar reputation, one of the Seven Sisters. Her mother, Ruth, was a visiting scholar in medieval history at the Radcliffe Institute for Advanced Study. The family lived in Needham, another Boston suburb.

Britton attended the Dana Hall School, a private school in Wellesley. In addition to her academic studies, she learned to ride horses, play the piano and organ, and paint. She went to Radcliffe herself, where she majored in anthropology, writing her senior thesis on comparative methodologies in studying one of the Périgordian cultures in a week. After graduating magna cum laude in 1967, she was accepted into Harvard's graduate program in the field.

Britton was particularly interested in Near Eastern archaeology. In mid-1968, she was one of several doctoral candidates who accompanied department chair Stephen Williams and project leader C. C. Lamberg-Karlovsky to a dig in southeastern Iran, where they found what Lamberg-Karlovsky believed to be the ruins of Alexandria Carmania, a fortress taken in 325 BCE by Alexander the Great, at the Tepe Yahya mound. Lamberg-Karlovsky later credited Britton with one of the dig's important finds.

Britton lived in a fourth-floor apartment at 6 University Road, a Harvard-owned building two blocks from Harvard Square. When studying, Britton did most of her work at the university's Peabody Museum of Archaeology and Ethnology. Outside of her studies, she painted pictures of animals in her apartment, where she kept a turtle and cat as pets. She also socialized, primarily with fellow students in her department. One of them, James Humphries, had become her boyfriend; she also frequently dined with fellow anthropology graduate students Donald and Jill Mitchell. They lived in the apartment next to hers and she had played the organ at their wedding ceremony.

=== Apartment and neighborhood security issues ===
Contemporary newspaper accounts describe the building as decrepit and unsafe. The New York Times called it "seedy and roach-infested" with peeling paint in the hallways. In 1963 Beverly Samans, a graduate student at Boston University had been raped and murdered in her apartment in the same building; the crime still had not been solved five years later but was believed to have been one of 13 committed by the Boston Strangler. The Harvard Crimson reported that the "littered and dingy" building had no locks on the outside doors despite repeated pleas from tenants to install them, along with a buzzer system, to further restrict entry to their guests. Britton's own apartment door had a lock so dysfunctional she rarely used it; the Mitchells said she intended to move out of the building early the next year.

Street crime had also become a problem in the neighborhood over the preceding months. The Tech, the weekly student newspaper at the Massachusetts Institute of Technology, also located in Cambridge, reported that several Harvard students and faculty had been the victims of muggings or attempted muggings in the area between Cambridge Common and the Radcliffe dormitories in late 1968. Friends of Britton recalled that while an undergraduate at Radcliffe she had fought off an attacker on the Commons with a penknife, slashing his clothes in the process; the incident had not been reported to the police.

== Murder ==
On the night of January 6, 1969, the first Monday of the new year and the day classes resumed after the holiday break, Britton and Humphries joined other anthropology classmates for dinner at a local restaurant, after which the couple went ice skating on the Common. Humphries returned with her to her apartment at 10:30 p.m. and left her for the night at 11:30 p.m. Britton went over to her neighbors the Mitchells to have some sherry at 12:30 a.m.

January 7 was an important day for all the anthropology doctoral candidates, as it was the day of their general examinations, the culmination of the classroom portion of their degrees, after which they would commence full-time work on their dissertations. Britton did not attend, which her classmates found unusual for a woman who had shown such dedication to her studies. Humphries called her repeatedly that morning but she did not answer.

After the exam, shortly after noon, Humphries went to Britton's apartment. Since the door was unlocked, he was able to enter, and found her body face down on her bed with her nightgown pulled over her head and a rug and fur coat over her upper body. Thinking she was sick, he went next door and asked Jill Mitchell if she would take a closer look. When she did, she discovered Britton's bloodied head and realized she was dead.

== Investigation ==
The Cambridge police were called to the apartment and began collecting evidence; they found that Britton had been raped as well as killed. She was officially pronounced dead by the medical examiner; by that evening he had performed an autopsy and, having found multiple lacerations to the head with underlying skull fractures, as well as a bruise on her arm, ruled the death a homicide by blunt force trauma that had occurred roughly 10 hours before the body was discovered. Nothing of value had been taken from the apartment. The Massachusetts State Police were called in to sweep the apartment for any forensic evidence.

From the shape of the head wounds, the murder weapon had had a point, but investigators could not determine exactly what had been used. "It was something sharp, like a hatchet or cleaver", said Leo Davenport, the lead detective on the case. Later they speculated that a 4-by-6-inch (10 by 15 cm) stone with a pointed end, a souvenir Britton had brought home from the Iranian dig, had been used. It was missing, and the state police found no weapon in the apartment; however, they did find a set of fingerprints which matched neither Britton nor anyone else investigators knew to have been in the apartment.

The final results of the autopsy, a week later, similarly failed to produce any new information. "[We know] nothing ... more than we knew about the murder when we started" Middlesex County District Attorney John Droney told the Times. "There is no suspect".

Canvassing the building did, however, produce a few leads. A child in one other apartment in the building recalled hearing unusual noises on the fire escape that night. Another neighbor of Britton's told police that he had seen a man whom he described as about 6 feet (180 cm) tall and 170 pounds (77 kg) running away from the building at 1:30 a.m.

=== Effect of media coverage ===
Because of the Harvard and Radcliffe connections, the case attracted national media attention. The New York Times ran several articles about the case over the next two weeks. It was the first assignment for United Press International reporter Michael Widmer, and newspapers as far away as California ran his stories.

Much reporting focused on one unusual aspect of the case. Britton's body, along with the floor, walls, and ceiling, had been sprinkled with a reddish-brown powder identified as either red ochre or iron oxide. When police had told Professor Williams of this while discussing the case with him, he said that ancient Iranians, along with many other cultures in the world, had sprinkled it over the dead as a funeral rite. Along with the way Britton's clothing had been used to cover her body, and the killer's apparent lack of interest in taking her valuables, that led to speculation that she had been killed by someone who knew her from Harvard and not a stranger.

Lamberg-Karlovsky called that idea "completely fabricated and without foundation". Nevertheless, Williams gave police a list of one hundred students and faculty from the department who might have had this knowledge, most of whom testified at a February grand jury hearing, expedited since many of them were due to leave the country for digs in a few months. But at the same time he dismissed rumors that there had been friction among the team members in Iran that might have motivated someone to murder, saying nothing more serious occurred than the sort of minor tensions that arise among a group living and working closely together for an extended period. "There were complaints about too much tuna fish", he recalled.

Many of Britton's friends could not imagine anyone wanting to kill her. The Cambridge police nonetheless filmed her January 10 funeral service, in case someone in attendance had been involved and gave themselves away by their behavior. Lie detector tests were administered to Humphries and the Mitchells, and detectives talked to, or attempted to talk to, anyone mentioned in her diary and an old phone directory.

Three days after the killing, the Cambridge police announced they had found the stone but would not say where. At a special news conference on the case, Chief James Reagan said that from then on detectives would need his permission to disclose any information about the case. He claimed that this was due to inaccuracies in reporting on the case.

With little news from the police, media speculation centered on the active counterculture of the era, which was very present in Cambridge. A Radcliffe friend of Britton's told the Times that "[s]he knew a lot of odd people in Cambridge—the hangers-on and acid heads who you would not call young wholesome Harvard and Radcliffe types" to the point that she attended parties through and got along well with them. It was postulated that perhaps whoever had killed Britton had been under the influence of hallucinogenic drugs popular with members of the counterculture at the time.

=== Ada Bean homicide ===
On February 6, less than a month after Britton was found dead, another woman, with past connections to Harvard, was found slain in her Cambridge residence under similar circumstances. Ada Bean, 50, a former research secretary at the university, was found raped and beaten to death in her Linnaean Street apartment, close to the Radcliffe campus and 1 mile (1.6 km) north of Britton's University Road building.

Bean's body also was found on her bed, face down, her nightclothes pulled over her head, covered by blankets. She, too, was found by someone who had noticed her absence, in her case her employer since she had failed to show up for work, who entered the apartment with the assistance of the building's janitor. Police believed she, like Britton, had been killed in her sleep (however, her building had the outside locks and functional indoor locks that Britton's did not).

The similarity of the two killings led to speculation that the same assailant was involved. By that time, Albert DeSalvo had confessed to the murder of Samans, as well as the other 12 victims of the Boston Strangler earlier in the decade. He was sentenced to life in prison for other offenses since he could not be prosecuted for the murders. As he was already in a mental hospital, he could not have also killed Britton and Bean. But DeSalvo's confession had been the only evidence linking him to most of the Strangler murders, (Note: Although DeSalvo's confession to the last of the murders, in 1964, was inconsistent with the details of the crime, and some investigators thought he was confessing to the crimes purely for self-aggrandizement, DNA evidence has subsequently linked him to that crime.) and there had been speculation that there was more than one killer responsible for those killings—a second killer who might have resumed his activities with Britton and Bean. Police would not say whether the two murders were linked to each other, or to any others.

== Cold case ==
After the initial investigation and its frustrations, no further information of value emerged, and the now-cold case fell from the attention of the police, media and public as newer crimes took its place. It was never closed, however. Occasional media coverage of the case was limited by the police's continued refusal to release any of the original records from the case, citing the ongoing investigation.

Evidence from the case was well-preserved, and when DNA testing became available to investigators in the late 1980s, they eventually tested the semen left by the killer. It did not produce any matches to the profiles of known offenders at the time, nor did a 2006 retest. In the early 2010s, several writers—Widmer, New Yorker staff writer Becky Cooper, and Alyssa Bertetto, moderator of the Unresolved Mysteries subreddit—began looking into the case and requesting copies of the investigatory records.

Most of these requests were denied. When the journalists did receive records, they were very limited, sometimes just consisting of newspaper clippings of articles about the case. Even the records that had been shared with the authors of those articles were withheld. Widmer observed that this was a common pattern for law enforcement in Massachusetts, to refuse to release all but the most basic information about long-cold cases. He, Cooper (who had left the magazine to work full-time on a book about the Britton case), and Bertetto all filed appeals with the state Supervisor of Records to force the release of the case files, arguing that fresh leads had been generated by the release of information from long-cold cases in other jurisdictions.

During preparations for the court hearings in the cases, police and prosecutors reviewed all the information they had. While doing so, they looked at the DNA evidence again and considered whether it was time to have it processed again in the hope of finding a match. The state police told them newer forensic techniques could process more of the DNA, making it more likely that they could find a match this time. The investigators decided to try again.

== Posthumous identification of perpetrator through DNA ==
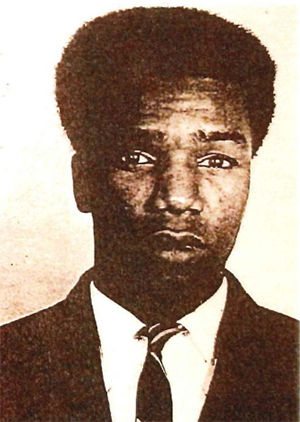
Michael Sumpter in a 1968 prison ID photo

The 2017 DNA analysis was, for the first time in the case, able to recover enough DNA to perform a Y-STR analysis and thus obtain strings specific to a male depositor. Entered into the federal Combined DNA Index System (CODIS), that string came back as a "soft hit" on an identifiable suspect: Michael Sumpter, a convicted rapist who had died in 2001, a little over a year after he was paroled from his sentence for that crime into hospice care for the terminal cancer from which he was suffering.

To be certain it was Sumpter's DNA, investigators needed to test the Britton case DNA against DNA from another closely related male, since the portion of DNA tested by the Y-STR remains the same in all males of the same line. Sumpter's records mentioned a brother, but his whereabouts by the mid-2010s were unknown. Researching the family on Ancestry.com led police to him, and he provided them with a sample that matched the one believed to be his brother's closely enough to eliminate all but 0.08% of the human male population as suspects.

During his lifetime, Sumpter had been convicted of two rapes, the second of which occurred when he escaped from a work release program he was in while serving his sentence for the first. Earlier investigations had found similar matches between his DNA and that from two other previously unsolved Cambridge rape-murders in the early 1970s, predating his first conviction, as well as another unsolved rape, bringing his lifetime total of known offenses to five rapes and three murders. However, despite the similarities in the Ada Bean case, police do not consider Sumpter a suspect there.

Further investigation found other circumstantial evidence that connected Sumpter to Cambridge in 1969. While he did not live in the city at the time, he had during his childhood in the 1950s, and attended first grade in the Cambridge Public School District; later in his youth he had been arrested as a juvenile by city police. Two years before the killing, he had worked on Arrow Street about 1 mile (1.6 km) from the apartment, and at the time his girlfriend lived in Cambridge. In 1972, he was convicted of assaulting a woman he had met at the Harvard Square subway station, (Note: As it was known then; today it is called the Harvard station.) just a few blocks from University Road.

At a November 2018 news conference, Middlesex County District Attorney Marian T. Ryan announced the results of the investigation: "Michael Sumpter ... has been identified as the person responsible for the 1969 murder of Jane Britton." Although Sumpter could not be tried due to his death, Ryan stated that "I am confident that the mystery of who killed Jane Britton has finally been solved and this case is officially closed." It was the oldest cold case in Middlesex County to be solved, she said.

Having identified the perpetrator, police set out their theory of how Sumpter had committed the crime. As one of the witness accounts at the time had suggested, despite the building's deficient security he had probably used the fire escape to gain access to Britton's apartment. Toxicology reports from the autopsy had found that while Britton's blood was alcohol-free, her stomach had an 0.08% alcohol content from the Mitchells' sherry, suggesting that she had died before it could be metabolized, within a short time of returning to her apartment. Once Sumpter had finished, he went back down the fire escape and fled the building. His height and weight at that time—5 feet 11 inches (180 cm) and 185 pounds (84 kg)—were close to that estimated by the neighbor who had seen the man running away at 1:30 a.m.

Despite the great significance originally accorded the scattered red ochre, police later concluded that it was a "red herring", just flakes or other residue from Britton's painting, as it is a common pigment in paints.

== See also ==
- Crime in Massachusetts
- Timeline of Cambridge, Massachusetts
- List of serial killers in the United States
- Faith Hedgepeth homicide, similar 2012 slaying of a college student in her residence, also marked by police reticence and perplexing evidence with body; a suspect was arrested in 2021.
- Golden State Killer, serial killer identified and arrested in 2018 through family DNA connections
