= Fantasy Fest =

Street party in Key West, Florida

Coordinates: 24.553213°N 81.802311°W

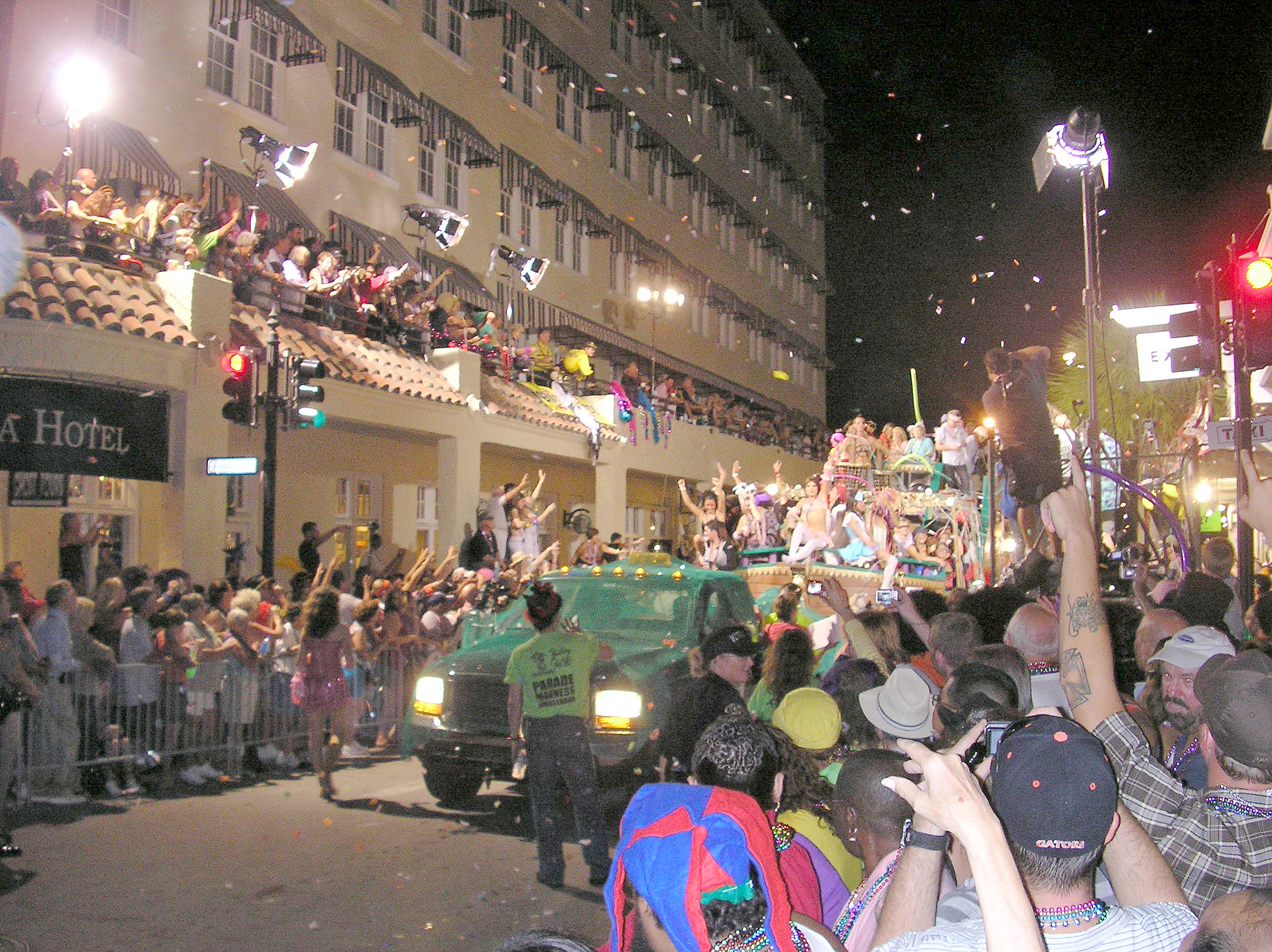
A float during the 2007 Fantasy Fest parade, the culminating event of the week-long event. In the background is the La Concha.

Fantasy Fest is a street party held annually in the last week of October in Key West, Florida.

== History ==
Fantasy Fest was initiated in 1979 by Bill Conkle, Tony Falcone, Joe Liszka and Frank Romano to attract tourists during the slow season. In 1995 over 60,000 people attended and there were 70 floats, bands, costumed groups and "imprecision drill teams" in the parade. In 2001 Fantasy Fest was estimated to bring $35 million to the region each year.

The highlight of Fantasy Fest is its parade featuring humorous floats, including one carrying the annually elected Conch King and Queen. The floats can be quite elaborate; costs can be $10,000 to $15,000. The expense for the floats is borne fully by the participant groups (called krewes) and their sponsors.

In October 2005, the event was postponed because of devastation wrought on the island by Hurricane Wilma; instead of being held at its usual time close to Halloween, it was moved to December and celebrated just before Christmas. The theme that year was "Freaks, Geeks and Goddesses."

2020 was to be in its 42nd year. However, that year's event was cancelled due to the COVID-19 pandemic and deferred to 2021.

== Typical Fantasy Fest Experiences ==
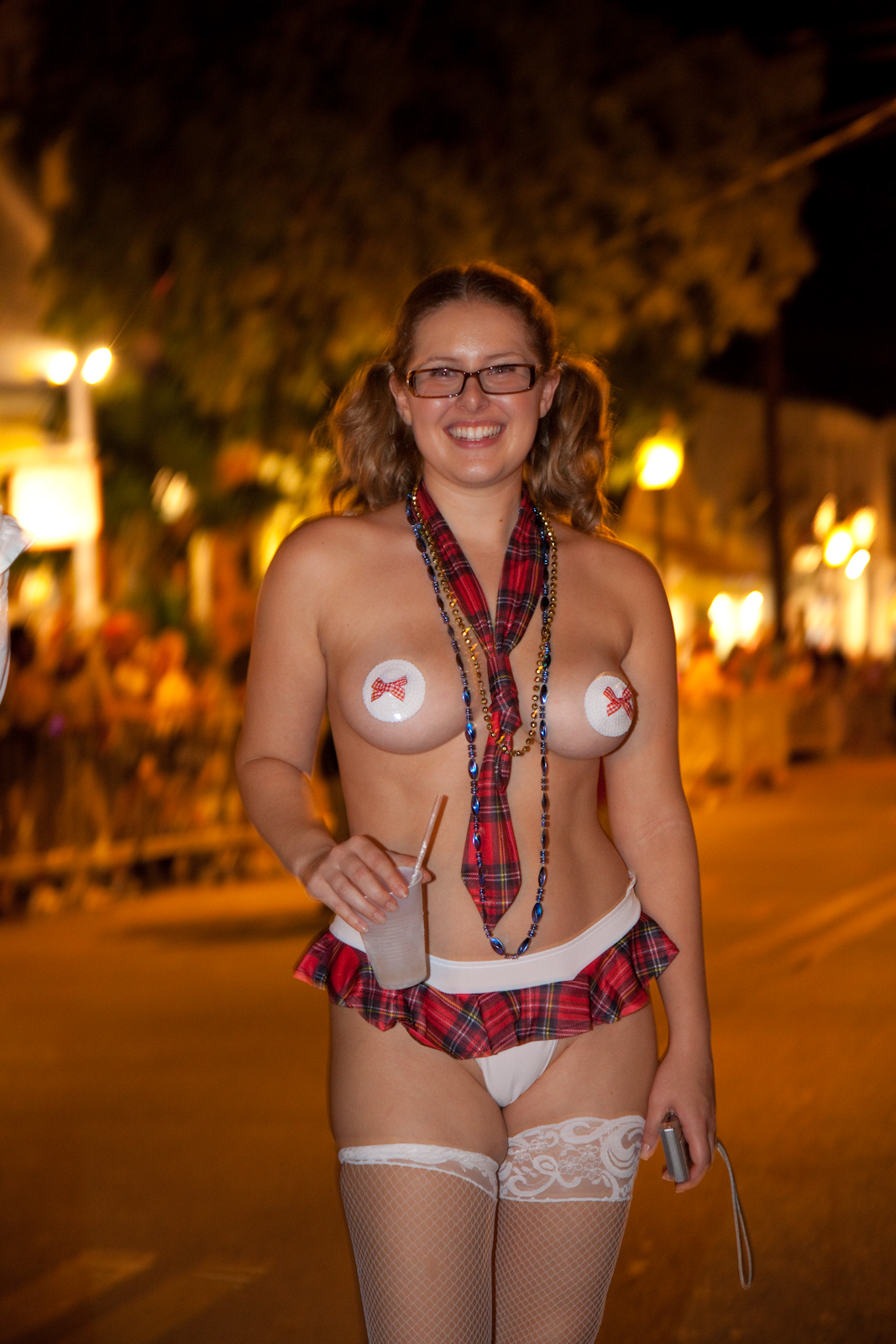
Schoolgirl uniform fetishism: A topless woman wearing pasties at Fantasy Fest

Fantasy Fest has been compared to New Orleans Mardi Gras and Carnival in Rio de Janeiro. As with New Orleans Mardi Gras on Bourbon Street in New Orleans, Fantasy Fest tend to attract many people to the concentration of bars along Duval Street. Most of the event is adult oriented, however, there are family friendly events. Nudity is illegal in Key West, but on the last two days of Fantasy Fest the city designates a "Fantasy Zone" in the city where women may expose their breasts if they are covered with body paint. Costumes worn at Fantasy Fest often feature nudity and sexual symbolism.

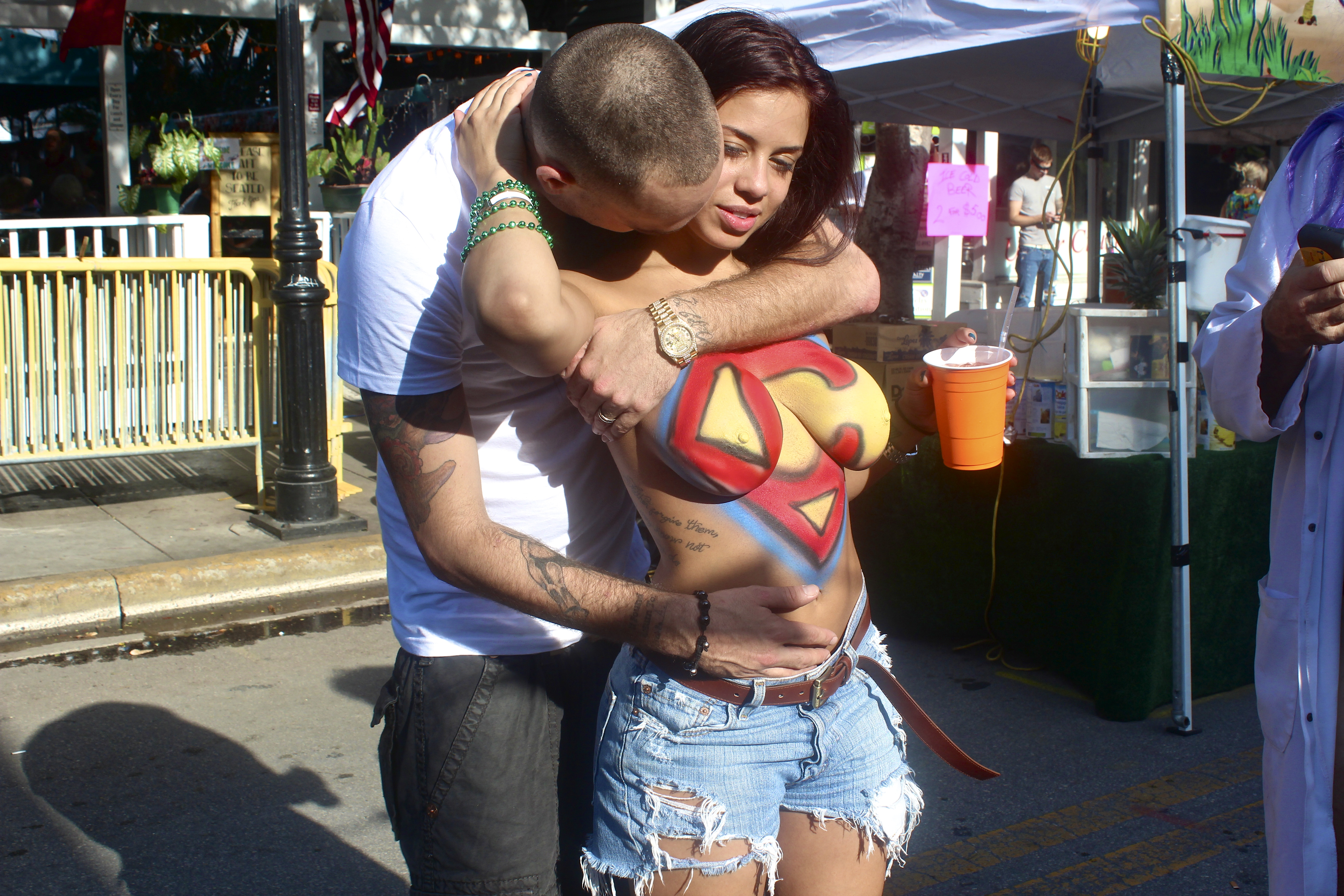
Body painting and public display of affection at Fantasy Fest, 2012

== The King and Queen of Fantasy Fest ==
The King and Queen of Fantasy Fest are annual titles bestowed at the Coronation Ball, a fundraiser for a community AIDS care service, that marks the official beginning of the event. The king and queen are residents of Key West, Florida, selected via an 8-week fundraising campaign.

Their Royal Court is subsequently composed of fellow Candidates who didn't raise as much, but are still honored with the titles of Duke and Duchess (and, one rare instance, Prince and Princess). For 8 weeks, these Candidates serve as ambassadors for AIDS Help, the non-profit agency that has assisted those living with HIV/AIDS in the Keys since 1986.

A varied array of events are individually staged by Candidates, as well as All-Candidate events that unite the campaigns, including a spin on the 'America Idol' singing competition, a Sunday BINGO, a Saturday Red Shirt Run in September and mixers at island venues.

The Royal Court, their support staff and other key agency supporters all appear prominently in the evening Duval Street parade on a float designed specifically to highlight their financial achievement.

== Events ==
- Goombay - a two-day street party held in Key West's Bahama Village neighborhood. It is named after the Goombay goatskin drums that generate the party's rhythms and celebrates the heritage of Key West's large Bahamian population with food, art and a lot of dancing.
- The Royal Coronation Ball - where the Conch King and Queen are crowned.
- Zombie Bike Ride: family-friendly event involving costume and bicycle decoration.
- Tutu Tuesday: adult costume party with tutu dress code.
- The Pet Masquerade - costume contest for pets.
- Fogarty's Red Party: adult party with red costumes, decor, and festivities. The original Fantasy Fest "color" party.
- The Headdress Ball: gay and lesbian event by the Key West Business Guild.
- The Street Fair: food, drink, costume, and arts and crafts down Duval Street.
- The Masquerade March - a daytime procession through the streets of Key West.
- The Fantasy Fest parade - the culmination of the festival.
- Children's Day: family-friendly event held in Bayview Park with children's festivities and contests.

== See also ==
- Folsom Street Fair
- Mardi Gras
- Nudes-A-Poppin'
