= Thomas T. Hoopes Prize =

Prize for Harvard undergraduates

The Thomas T. Hoopes Prize is an award given annually to Harvard University undergraduates. The prize was endowed by Thomas T. Hoopes, Class of 1919.

Awarded for outstanding scholarly work or research by students, recipients are selected by a committee of faculty from the Faculty of Arts and Sciences, representing the three branches of study—the humanities, the natural sciences, and the social sciences. All submissions must be nominated for consideration by the project's advisor.

Winning students and their advisors both receive cash awards. As of 2021, the students winners are awarded $5,000 and the faculty nominators are awarded $2,000. Winning projects are bound and displayed in Lamont Library for two years.

== Notable Recipients ==
- 1989: Mira Sorvino
- 1990: Kyriakos Mitsotakis (Greece)
- 1994: David R. Liu
- 1996: Steven Engel; Samuel Rascoff
- 1999: Elif Batuman, Evan Osnos
- 2002: Stephen E. Sachs
- 2008: Alison Miller
- 2011: Becky Cooper, Isidore Bethel
- 2021: Malia Obama

== See also ==
- Harvard College
