= Arlo Haskell =

American author and publisher

Arlo Haskell in Key West, FL (Photo: Ashley Kamen)

Arlo Haskell is an American author, publisher, and literary organizer.

== Early life and education ==
Arlo Haskell was born and raised in Key West, Florida, where his mother, Monica Haskell, was director of the Key West Literary Seminar during the late 1980s and early 1990s. Haskell attended Bard College in the late 1990s, where he studied poetry and was a student of John Ashbery. After college, he worked for David Wolkowsky, ferrying guests to Wolkowsky's private island and doing other odd jobs.

== Career ==
In 2017, Haskell authored and published his first work of nonfiction, The Jews of Key West: Smugglers, Cigar Makers, and Revolutionaries (1823–1969) (Sand Paper Press). Critics generally praised the social history for its depth of research and style, arguing that it had filled gaps in regional Florida history and in American Jewish history. In a review for the Journal of the Southern Jewish Historical Society, Raymond Arsenault remarked that it "introduces a fascinating cast of characters, revealing a unique saga of Jewish community life that no previous historian has chronicled." The Jews of Key West won the Phillip and Dana Zimmerman Gold Medal for Florida Nonfiction from the Florida Book Awards and a President's Medal from the Florida Authors and Publishers Association. Haskell is also the author of the poetry collection, Joker (Sand Paper Press, 2009).

Haskell is the publisher of Sand Paper Press, a small press he founded in 2003, where he has frequently collaborated with poet and translator Stuart Krimko. Publications include The Last Books of Héctor Viel Temperley (2011), which was translated from Spanish by Krimko and named a BOMB Editor's Choice. Another Sand Paper title, Harry Mathews's The New Tourism (2010), was co-edited by Haskell and selected as a "Book of the Year" by The Times Literary Supplement.

Haskell is executive director of Key West Literary Seminar, the nonprofit organization whose annual writers' conference has been held since 1983. His career with the organization began in 2008, when he led the digitization of its extensive audio archive. Since his promotion to executive director in 2015, Haskell has increased the organization's scholarship program, launched a literary walking tour of Key West, and created writing programs for local high school students. In 2019, he led the organization in its $1.2 million purchase of the former home of poet Elizabeth Bishop.

On June 4, 2019, Haskell was named by city proclamation the Poet Laureate of Key West by the Mayor, Vice Mayor and Board of Commissioners of Key West.

=== Political activities ===
In 2020, Haskell co-founded the Key West Committee for Safer, Cleaner Ships, a nonprofit group that fought successfully to establish the first-ever regulations for cruise ships in Key West. As the group's treasurer, he helped organize a citizens' initiative that placed three referendums with proposed amendments to the city charter for a popular vote. Key West's voters approved the amendments by wide margins on November 3, 2020, resulting in limits on the size of cruise ships that may call and the number of persons that may disembark each day.

Haskell was the committee's primary spokesman during the political campaign, in which the cruise industry secretly financed a dark money group that lobbied against the measures using fearmongering and disinformation tactics. He was also an expert witness in the committee's legal defense of the referendums in Federal and State court.

Since their passage, the charter amendments have been cited as an inspiration by others seeking to regulate cruise ships in places including Bar Harbor, Maine, the Cayman Islands, and Juneau, Alaska.
