= Zombie Bike Ride =

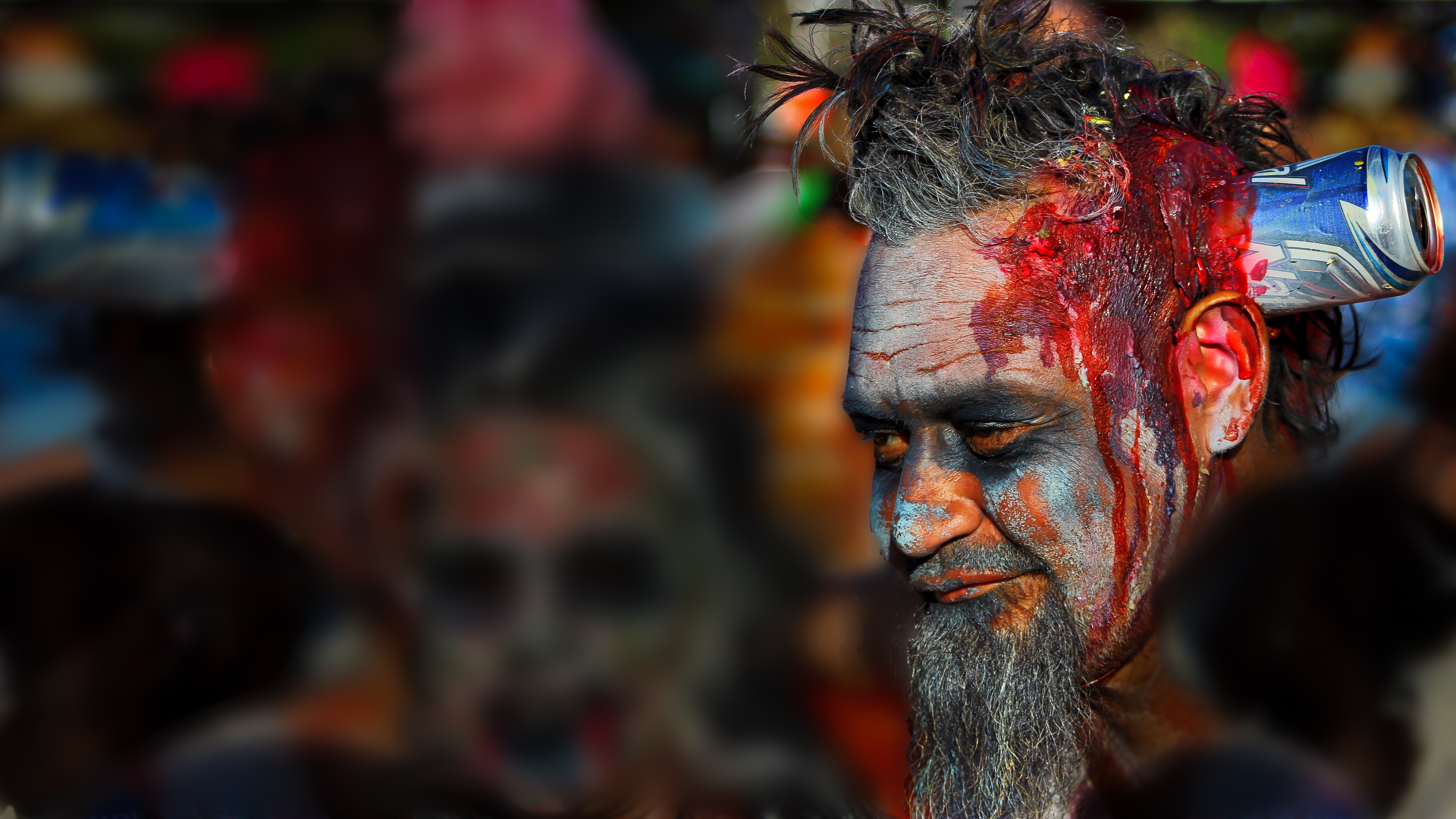
Zombie Bike Ride 2014 - Key West, FL

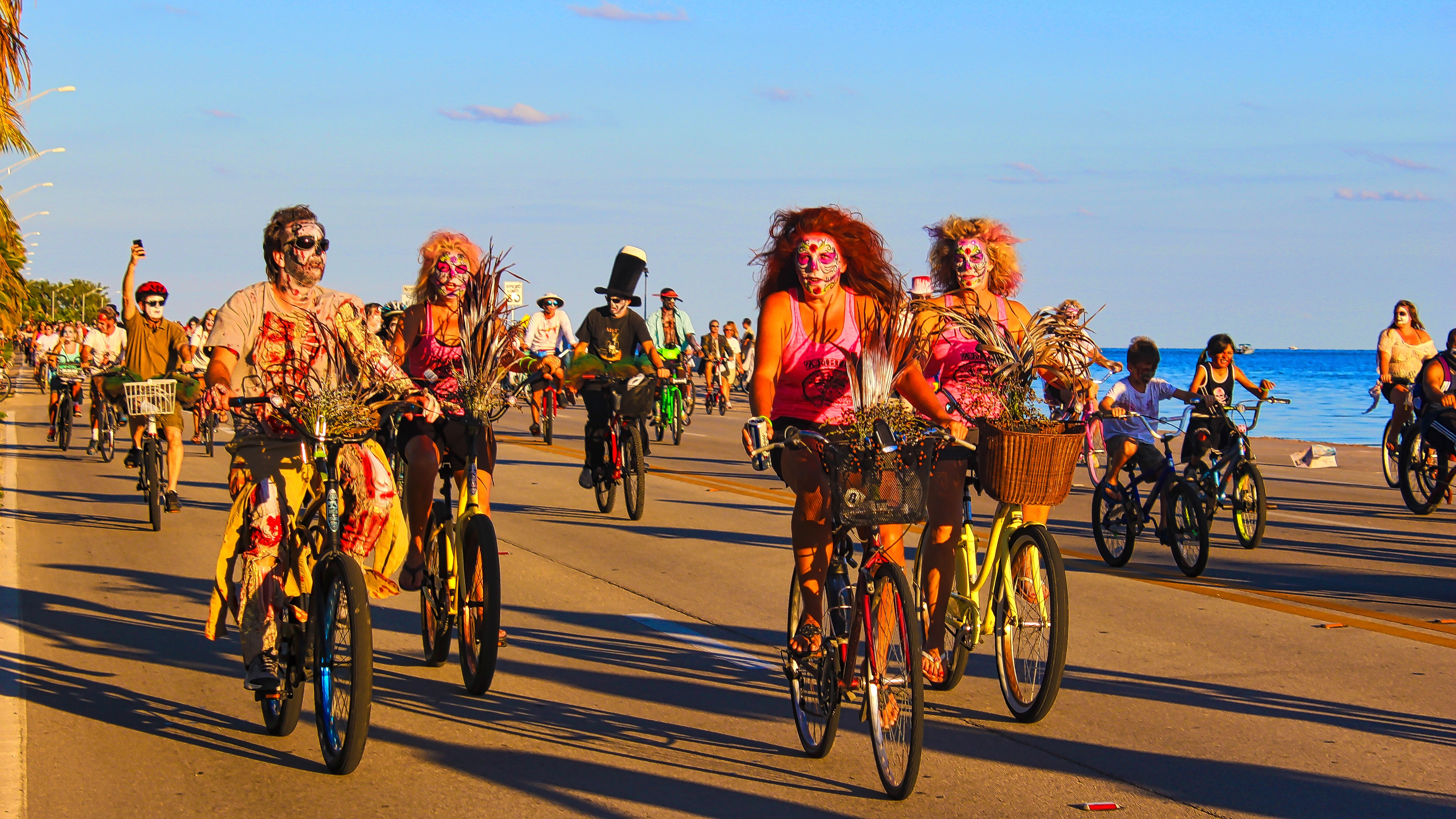
Zombie Bike Ride 2014 - Key West, FL

The Zombie Bike Ride is a celebration of the bicycle on the last week of October in Key West, Florida. Rock and roll, zombie bikes and costumes of all types and a one-mile leisurely ride along the Atlantic Ocean.

== History ==
The first Zombie Bike Ride was created in 2009 by the local WeCycle bike shop, three local businessmen, Marky Pierson of Wonderdog Productions and Evan Haskell & Chris Needham of WeCycle, organized the ride to celebrate the bicycle in a unique and intuitive way. The Zombie Bike Ride was quickly growing, doubling with every year, from a couple hundred people to nearly 5,000 in 2013 and has escalated to 7,000 zombies in 2014.

Participants of the Zombie Bike Ride wear everything from dead-like face and body-paint and gory zombie costumes to lively "walking dead" garb.
