= San Carlos Institute =

Cuban museum in Key West, Florida

Coordinates: 24.555279°N 81.802801°W

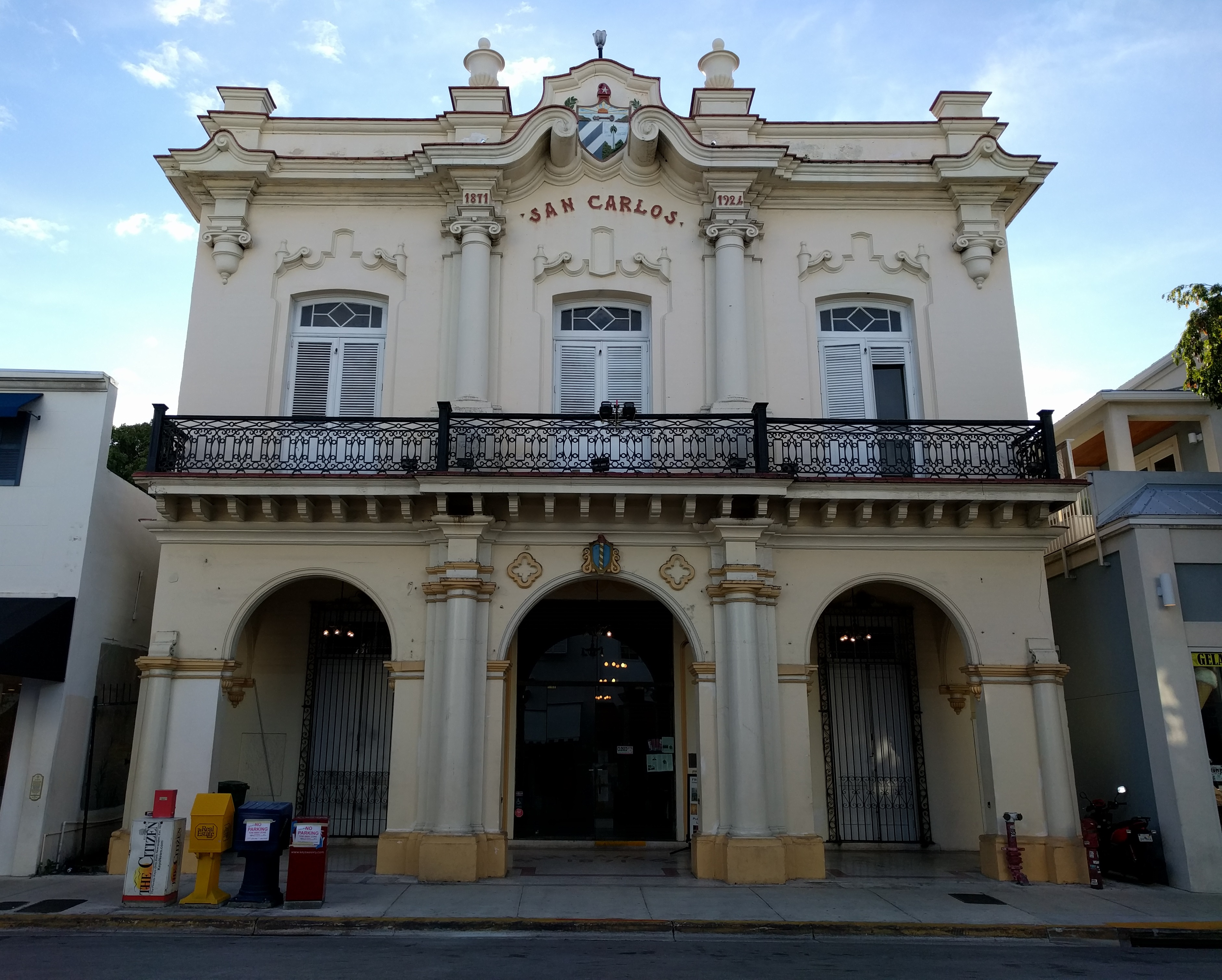
San Carlos Institute in Key West, Florida.

The San Carlos Institute, also known as the San Carlos, is a Cuban heritage center and museum located at 516 Duval Street in Key West, Florida. The institute was founded in 1871 by members of the Cuban exile community with the goal of preserving and promoting the language, cultural values, and patriotic ideals of the Cuban people. Today, the San Carlos Institute is a multi-purpose facility that functions as a museum, library, school, conference center, theater, and art gallery for the Key West community. The institute maintains several permanent installations related to Cuban history and hosts a number of popular cultural and artistic events.

== History ==
The San Carlos Institute was first established by members of the Cuban exile community who had taken refuge in Key West during the Ten Years' War (1868-1878). The effort was spearheaded by two prominent leaders of the exile community, Juan María Reyes and José Dolores Poyo, with the goal of creating a Cuban heritage and community center that would serve as host to cultural events, political meetings, and educational endeavors.

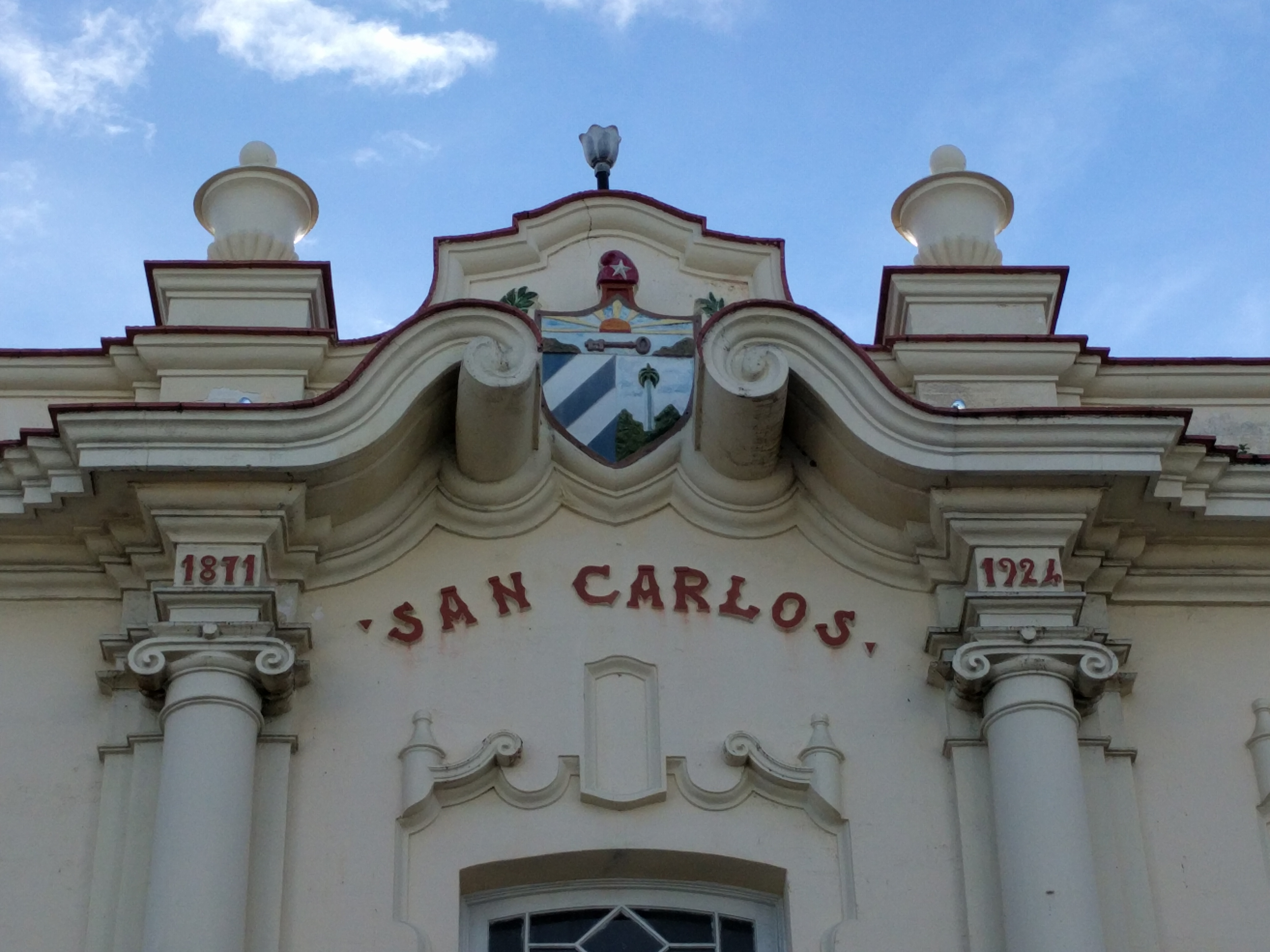
Close-up view of San Carlos Institute's exterior architecture.

On November 11, 1871, the San Carlos Institute officially opened its doors to the public at its original location on Anne Street. The growing institute was relocated to a larger facility on Fleming Street in 1884, but the building was severely damaged in a great fire that devastated much of the island of Key West in 1886. Under the guidance of Martín Herrera, a Cuban civic leader, the community went on to rebuild the San Carlos at its present location on Duval Street in 1890.

=== Cuban independence movement ===
The San Carlos Institute played a significant role in the Cuban independence movement as a meeting place where key figures of the movement could address the Cuban exile community of Key West, and one of its most notable speakers was the Cuban revolutionary José Martí. Beginning in January 1892, Martí made several trips to Key West to raise support, collect funding, and unite the divided exile community under the banner of a formal resistance movement against Spanish colonial rule. After several negotiation meetings with community leaders and the workers of local Cuban cigar factories, Martí called an assembly at the San Carlos Institute to announce the successful unification of the once-divided exile community behind the cause of Cuban independence.

Martí's efforts in Key West and other exile communities in the United States would lead to the establishment of the Cuban Revolutionary Party (Partido Revolucionario Cubano, or PRC), a key step toward Cuba's victory in the Cuban War of Independence.

=== Deterioration and restoration ===
For over a century, the San Carlos Institute operated one of the first bilingual and racially integrated schools in the United States. Key West children of all races were invited to take classes taught in Spanish and English. In 1973, however, the San Carlos was forced to close all of its facilities, including the school, due to looming financial collapse and the deteriorating structural condition of the building. The building remained closed and in disrepair for nearly two decades.

In 1981, the severely deteriorated San Carlos Institute was threatened with demolition after a sizable portion of the building's facade collapsed and injured a passing tourist. Faced with the reality of losing a historic Cuban-American landmark, the local Cuban community rallied to organize a state-wide effort to save the institute. With the helpful efforts of Florida's Hispanic Affairs Commission, the State of Florida agreed to aid in the restoration and preservation of the San Carlos Institute. The State provided $2.8 million in grants toward its restoration at the current Duval Street location. Miami attorney Rafael A. Peñalver Jr. played a major role in the restoration project and the raising of financial support for the project.

The San Carlos re-opened its doors in January 1992 with a three-day opening celebration. The Friends of Libraries U.S.A. later designated the San Carlos Institute as a Florida Literary Landmark and dedicated a plaque honoring José Martí's poetry, scholarship, and campaign for Cuban independence.

== Exhibitions and events ==
The San Carlos Institute maintains several permanent exhibits that highlight the histories of Cuba and the Cuban-American community in Florida:

- The Life and Works of José Martí: 1853 - 1895. This installation features a collection of photographs and documents that celebrate José Martí's life and contributions to the Cuban independence movement.
- The Pichs Collection: Exploring Cuba's History through its Postal Stamps. This is an online exhibit and joint venture with the Smithsonian Institution's National Postal Museum that explores Cuba's postal history from 1830-1939. The project includes a second virtual exhibit titled "Cuba's Commercial Aviation History", which documents the history of commercial aviation between Cuba and the United States.
- Portraits of Cuba's Presidents. This exhibit features a portrait collection of Cuba's constitutional presidents from 1902 to 1952.
- History of the San Carlos Institute. This exhibit documents the history of the San Carlos Institute from its inaugural opening in 1871 to the opening year of the exhibit in 2008.

The San Carlos also hosts and sponsors a number of cultural, historical, and artistic events throughout the year:

- Key West Literary Seminar. Held each January, the Key West Literary Seminar offers a series of readings, writers workshops, and panel discussions with famous writers from around the world. Many of the seminar's main events take place in the San Carlos Institute's 375-seat theater.
- Key West Film Festival. The San Carlos is a festival sponsor and serves as one of several locations for festival receptions and film screening events.
- Key West Songwriter's Festival. The San Carlos is a festival sponsor and serves as one of several locations for musical performances.
