= Arlo West =

American guitarist and singer-songwriter (born 1958)

Arlo West (born 1958, Oquossoc, Maine, United States) is an American guitarist and singer-songwriter. He has recorded fourteen albums and has appeared as a guest artist on many others. He has toured with Uncle John Turner and Bobby "Bobby T" Torello (both formerly with Johnny Winter). Touring Scandinavia for 20 years has helped develop a following in Sweden.

== Biography ==
At age 11 Arlo West's family moved to Auburn, Maine, where he was influenced by the many musicians living there. Guitarists such as Lenny Breau and Jeff Wright became friends with West and helped him develop his style of playing.

In 1985 West met Billy Gibbons of ZZ Top and Gibbons suggested that West moved to Austin, Texas. After moving to there he was signed to Russell Whitaker's label Brighton Road Productions. This allowed him to record several of his albums such as 1987's Rattlesnake and 1994's Blues College. Whitaker's studio, the Dallas Sound Lab, has produced many recordings and this recording contract was instrumental in exposing West's music to the world.

2000–Present day: Arlo West started Creative Forensic Services a forensic audio and video recorded evidence laboratory in Lewiston, Maine. Arlo West has consulted as an expert with several media organizations including CNN, ABC, NBC, CBS, Larry King, Good Morning America, History Channel, Discovery Channel, Crime Watch Daily, Animal Planet and many others like Orlando Sentinel, LA Sun Journal, Miami Herald. Mr. West has testified and consulted as a forensic audio expert in many high-profile cases. The Faith Hedgepeth homicide, Trayvon Martin, Natalee Holloway, Mel Gibson, Britney Spears and Michael Jackson are just a few of the cases that he has provided expertise for.

In 2007, West became friends with Bill Lawrence. They are concentrating on producing a documentary on Lawrence's life and career as an innovator of the electric guitar.
