= Duval Street =

American street, Florida, Key West

Coordinates: 24.553735°N 81.801265°W

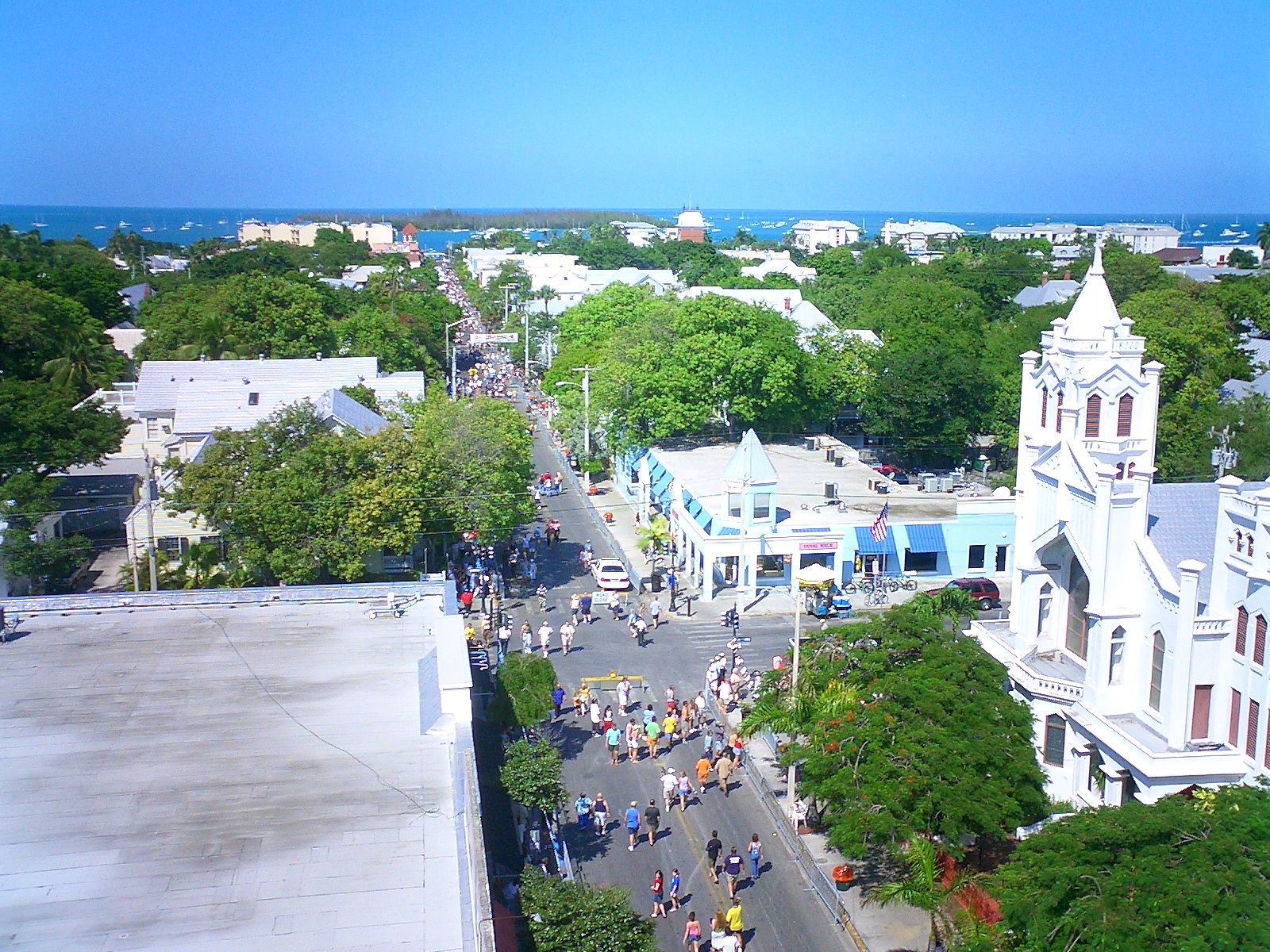
Aerial view of Duval St. with a view toward the Gulf of Mexico, taken from atop the La Concha Hotel during the day of Fantasy Fest parade 2004. Photo: Marc Averette

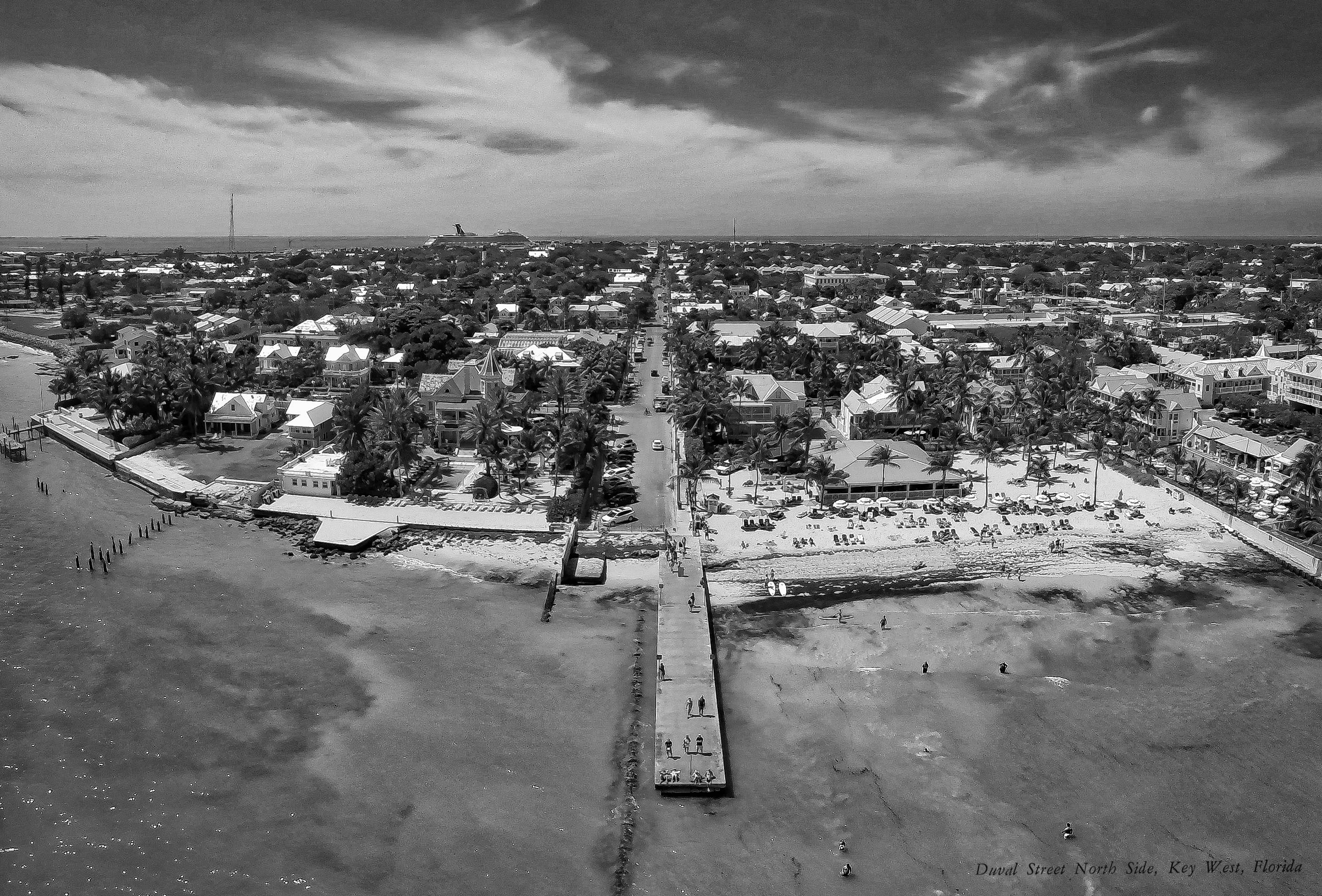
Duval Street, connecting the Atlantic Ocean to the Gulf of Mexico; taken from the air, south of the island.

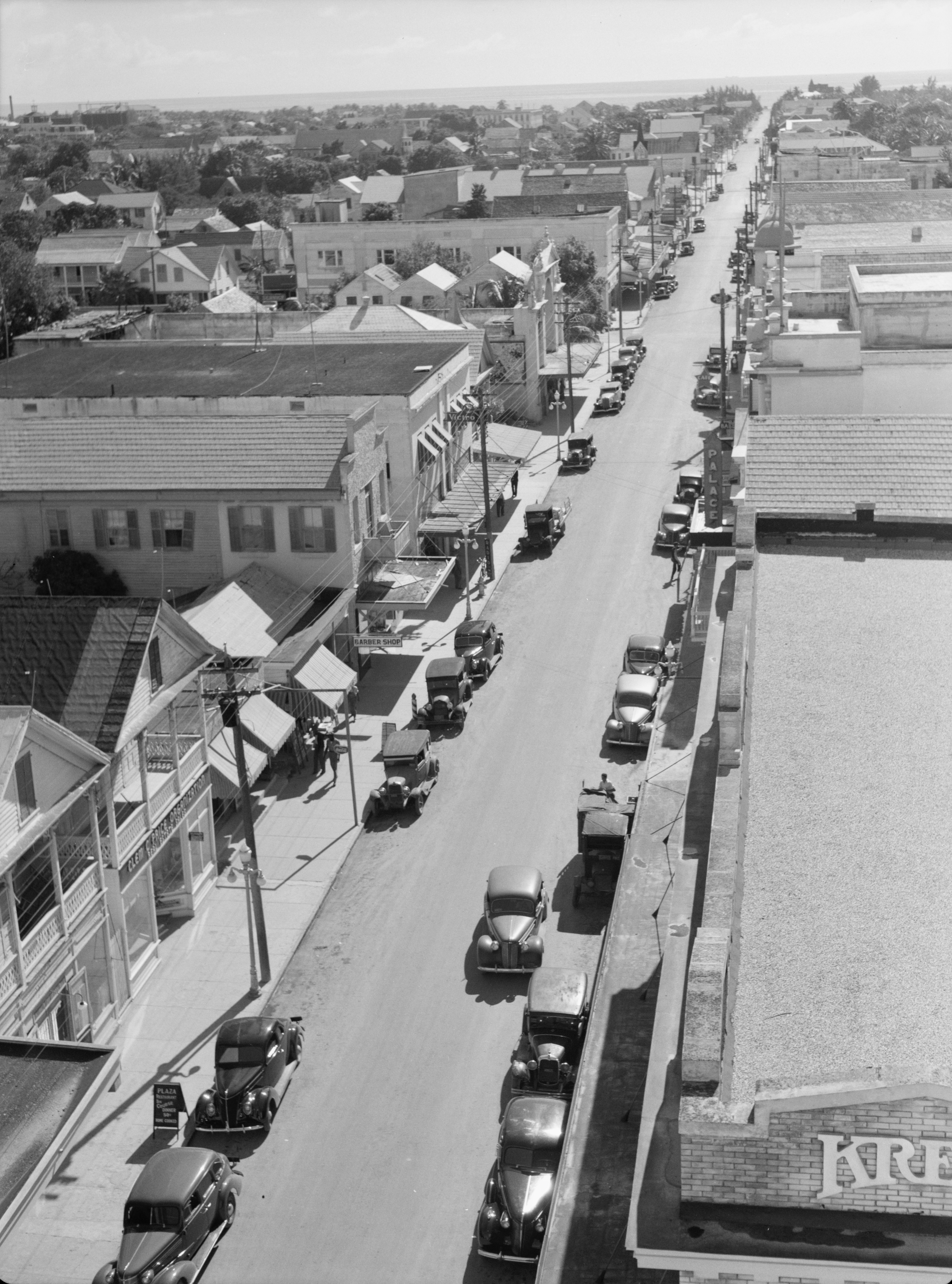
Duval St. seen from atop the La Concha Hotel in 1938, with a view toward the Atlantic. The Kress department store building seen at bottom right now houses a CVS. Photo: Arthur Rothstein

Duval Street (/ˈduːvəl/) is a downtown commercial zoned street in Key West, Florida, running north and south from the Gulf of Mexico to the Atlantic Ocean, just over 1.25 miles in length. It is named for William Pope Duval, the first territorial governor of Florida.

Duval Street was designated a "Great Street" in 2012 by the American Planning Association. The beautiful Bahamian and Spanish influenced Victorian Mansions of Duval Street have been well preserved through local preservation efforts starting in the 1960s. On the Atlantic Ocean end of Duval Street there is a mix of early Key West Victorian mansions and bungalows dotting the neighborhood. Art galleries, boutiques, inns and bodegas line the wide sidewalks. Although this end of Duval is more residential and less filled with tourists, the sidewalks still bustle with activity.

One block west of the southern terminus of Duval Street is the buoy marker for the southernmost point in the United States; it is close to the Southernmost House, a Victorian mansion built in 1896. A favorite of both Harry S. Truman and author Ernest Hemingway, the building was restored to its formal beauty and opulence with a $3 million renovation in 1996.

Duval Street well represents the cultural influence of Key West’s proximity and cultural ties to Cuba. Many Cubans immigrated to the area beginning in the late 1860s. At one time, the many cigar stores on Duval gave the city the moniker "Cigar City USA." There are many pleasant outdoor cafes to enjoy another Cubano influenced product, "Cuban Coffee", which is espresso made from roasted Cuban Coffee beans with a heavy dose of sugar. There is the San Carlos Institute. The San Carlos Institute was established on November 11, 1871 by members of the Cuban exile community who had taken refuge in Key West during the Ten Years' War (1868-1878). The effort was spearheaded by two prominent leaders of the exile community, Juan María Reyes and José Dolores Poyo, with the goal of creating a Cuban heritage and community center that would serve as host to cultural events, political meetings, and educational endeavors.

At the north end, tourists from the cruise ships that dock at the Port of Key West, or Mallory Square, are often seen traversing Duval Street's many shops [1] in the afternoon looking for souvenir trinkets and cheap T-shirts. The streets are congested with Pedi cabs, trollies, bikes, mopeds, cars, and the Conch Train all adding to the touristy feel of this heavily visited end of Duval.

Near the northern end of the street is Mallory Square. Historic Mallory Square is the center of Key West’s waterfront. The City of Key West and Duval Street share their beginning along this deep harbor waterfront.

On certain nights, the gulf shores of Duval Street often vibrate with a carnival like atmosphere that lasts until dawn and beyond. In fact, the ritual has a name known to tourists and residents as the “Duval Pub Crawl.” Duval is the location of many famous restaurants and bars, including Sloppy Joe's, Jimmy Buffett's Margaritaville, which is the original, Fogarty's Restaurant, Bar and Bakery, "The Flying Monkeys Bar", The Bull and Whistle, Rick's Cafe and Irish Kevin's bar, Bourbon Street Pub and Aqua. Tour outlets book the “Duval Pub Crawl” activity and provide knowledgeable guidance for the tourist wishing to visit and imbibe at the famous drinking establishments, for a fee.

A 1967 National Park Service survey of Historic American Buildings designated 18 buildings as historic. A full six blocks were added to the National Register of Historic Places in 1971. Further protection for this historically significant street has been created through the City’s, “Historic Architecture Guidelines,” approved in 2000, which sets standards for construction on Duval Street.

Duval Street is also a neighborhood within the City of Key West. It is defined as the area on either side of Duval Street, and includes the area to the north of Front Street, containing Wall Street, Mallory Square and the Port of Key West.
