= History of Key West =

The history of Key West begins thousands of years prior to recorded European contact, when the island became largely occupied by the Calusa and Tequesta Native American tribes. By the end of the Age of Discovery, Key West's indigenous history had largely diminished; brief settlements by transient Seminoles in the late 18th century introduced temporary trade in the surrounding Florida Keys, with early fishing and wrecking revenues becoming lucrative among passing Natives in the region. The island's first documented exploration by Europeans occurred in 1513 by the Spanish explorer Juan Ponce de León while attempting to reach Florida's Gulf Coast. (Note: In 1513, Ponce de Leon and his fleet of three ships and 200 men set sail from Puerto Rico and discovered the land of Florida in which he named La Florida. Upon encountering the Gulf Stream, Leon and his fleet began their voyage north to discover Florida's west coast. To do so, the fleet traveled south around the Florida Keys, where he named the newly discovered islands, Los Martires ("The Martyrs"). See Weddle (1985), p. 42) The island soon adopted the Spanish name, Cayo Hueso, literally meaning "bone cay", referring to the scattered bones attributed to inter‑tribal warring among Indigenous inhabitants. (Note: Key West's original name, Cayo Hueso, Spanish for "Bone Cay" or "Bone Key", refers to the white-bleached bones found on the island's beaches. It was believed to be left behind from a massacre between rivaling Natives.) Although ownership was claimed by the Spanish explorers, no permanent settlement had been established, and possession of the island was briefly asserted by the British Empire in 1763.

Following Spain's cession of Florida to the United States in 1819, the first permanent colonization of Key West began with American possession in 1821. Legal claim of the island occurred with the purchase by businessman John W. Simonton in 1822, in which federal property was asserted only three months later with the arrival of US Navy Lieutenant Matthew C. Perry. After being designated as an official Port of Entry in 1828, Key West's wrecking industry became a significant factor in the island's growing economy. By the 1830s, Key West was the wealthiest city in the United States per capita.

Shortly after Florida's secession from the United States in 1861, Federal forces seized Fort Zachary Taylor, securing their position in Key West as a stronghold for the duration of the ensuing American Civil War. The East Gulf Blockade Squadron, established on the island by the Union navy to restrict supplies reaching Confederate ports, played a significant role in supporting Union blockade operations in the Gulf of Mexico during the conflict with the South. With the completion of Henry Flagler's Overseas Railroad in the early 1910s, Key West was connected to the Florida mainland with Flagler's extension of the Florida East Coast Railway (FEC). In the years prior to the Cuban Revolution in 1953, frequent transport closely linked Key West and Havana. During the Cuban Missile Crisis, the island later became a strategic position for installation of missile defense systems and military personnel in the event of a sudden attack from Cuba. In his speeches regarding Fidel Castro, President John F. Kennedy often used the phrase "90 miles from Cuba" in reference to Key West's close proximity to Cuba.

Authors Lynn M. Homan and Thomas Reilly defined Key West's role in the 20th century as that of a significant "artistic haven". The island was home to novelist Ernest Hemingway for eight years, during which he wrote several of his major works. It also served as a longtime residence for playwright Tennessee Williams, who spent much of his later life on the island. In subsequent decades, Key West hosted a number of prominent writers, including John Hersey, Wallace Stevens, Robert Frost, Elizabeth Bishop, Shel Silverstein, and Thomas McGuane, as well as various musicians and celebrities such as Jimmy Buffett, Jerry Jeff Walker, Richard Burton, and Sally Rand.

== Prehistory and settlement ==
=== Geological development ===
According to USGS geologists, Barbara Lidz and Eugene Shinn, the geological history of Key West coincides with the early sedimentary development of the Florida Keys in the latter part of the Pleistocene and Holocene epochs in the last 500 million years. Early deposition resulted in the accumulation of Pleistocene limestone over 200 feet in width in the Lower Keys. Key West and the Lower Keys are categorized geologically by their particular coralloid composition, sometimes classified as the High Coral Keys, Low Coral Keys and the Oolite Keys for their early foundation of sandbars and ooid composition. Key West is geologically distinctive from the rest of the Keys due to nonlinear orientation westward compared with the Upper Keys and Middle Keys, often attributed to the influence of southward or westward-trending currents. While largely formed from shallow sandbars and oolite shoals, evidence that Key West existed as a dense and inhabited "coral forest" reaching height of 10 to 18 feet is distinguishable from the "Low Coral Keys" with coral heights from five to ten feet.

During this period of geological formation, Key West's foundation was composed of compacted oolite deposits of calcium carbonate laying above Miami Colite limestone. The reduction of sea levels from the formation of glaciers during the Ice age resulted in the collapse of Key West's early coral forests. Geological shifts in the Pleistocene Epoch, 2–3 million years ago, may have altered the island into the shallow sand cays as it would be known as by human settlers. These shoals were shallow enough to facilitate photosynthesis and the development of coral reefs. As sea levels continuously lowered during the following periods of geological formation, the Florida Keys was eventually disconnected from the Florida mainland following its exposure as a landmass 100,000 to 125,000 years ago. During this time, Key West saw significantly less coral reef development than the Upper Keys as a result of the region's nutrient rich exchange of waters through perpendicular channels from the Gulf of Mexico to the Atlantic.

=== Human settlement ===
Historian John Viele traces possible human occupation of Key West to 3000 B.C.E, with indigenous groups related to Calusas, Matecumbes, Tequestas, and late Seminoles possibly settling in more than 800 islands in the Florida Keys. According to contemporary historian Jerry Wilkinson, the dominant inhabitants of the Florida Keys were likely the Calusa, however, the discovery of pottery fragments later indicated the presence of Tequesta and possibly evidence for Caribbean Island Natives. Wilkinson posits further archeological evidence indicating that the Calusa occupants may have functioned as a confederation composed of smaller tribes such as the Tequesta, Ais, or Jeaga. Primarily hunter-gatherers, the island's abundant source of fish, turtle, [obster, shellfish, and manatees provided native settlers with copious staple foods and even the installation of temporary trade outposts by later Seminoles. Spanish documents record a "Chief of the Key Bones", referring to a possible tribal leader or early chiefdom on Key West. During the period of Spanish control, many of Key West's native groups adopted aspects of the Spanish language, customs, and surnames, with evidence of the use of Spanish titles such as "captain-gener-al" "bishop", and "king" by Native leaders.

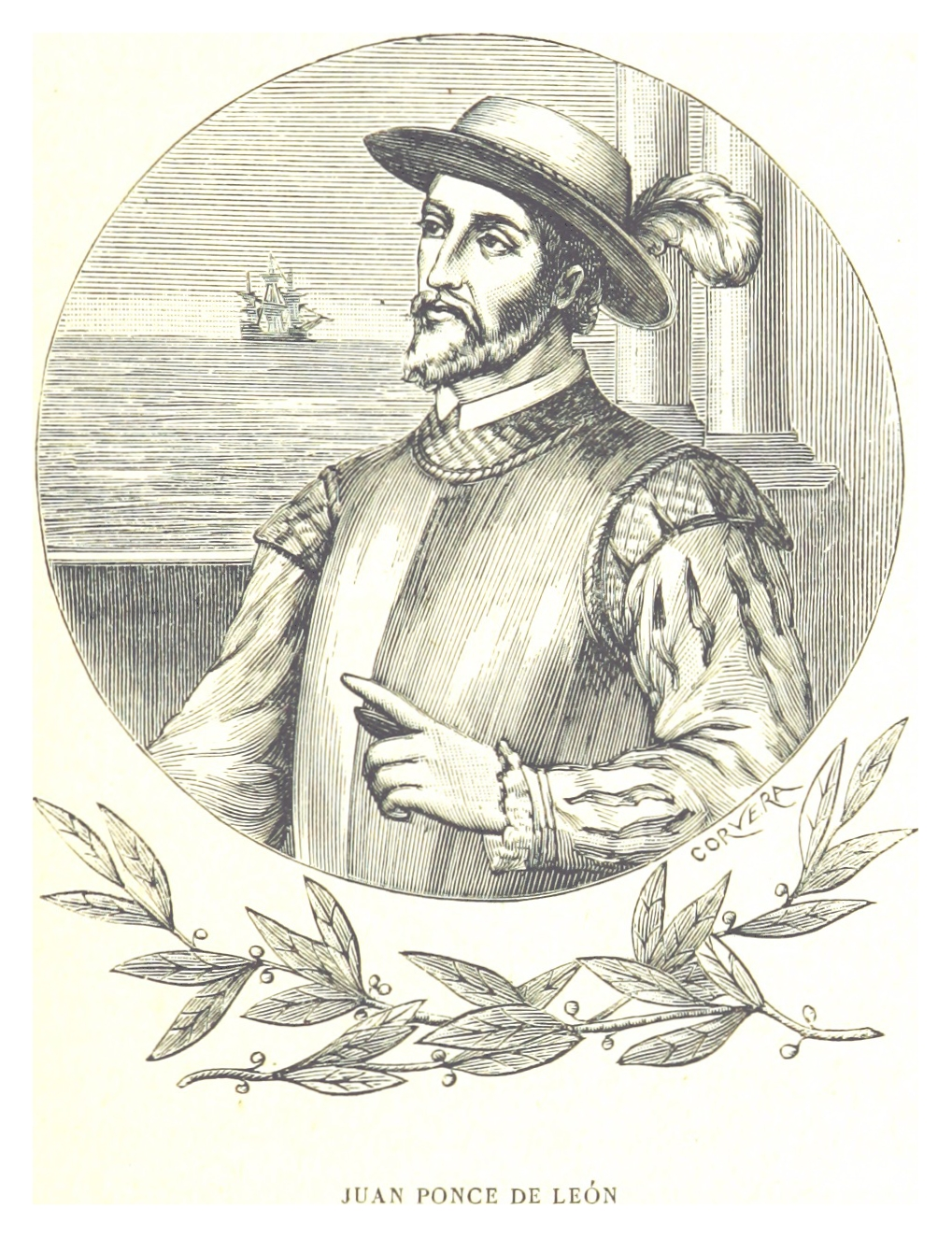
Juan Ponce de León

Upon sighting Key West during his voyage south along the keys in 1513, Ponce de León and his Spanish fleet adopted the island's original name of Cayo Hueso (Spanish pronunciation: [ˈkaʝo ˈweso]). The initial discovery of dried human bones reported along the island's beaches generally align with modern interpretations to be remnants of several battles fought between rivaling tribes and subsequently used as communal graveyard. In his correspondence with the lawyer and politician John Rodman in the 1830s, the then Collector of Customs and surveyor in Key West, William A. Whitehead, describes an early account of intermittent occupation of the island by various feuding "aborigines of the country." On the presence of Natives, Whitehead notes evidence of fortifications, possible burial grounds, and human bones initially believed to be rocks. An account relayed by a resident of 50 years describes how, approximately 130 years prior, two distinct Native American tribes, the island inhabitants and those from the mainland, came into conflict:

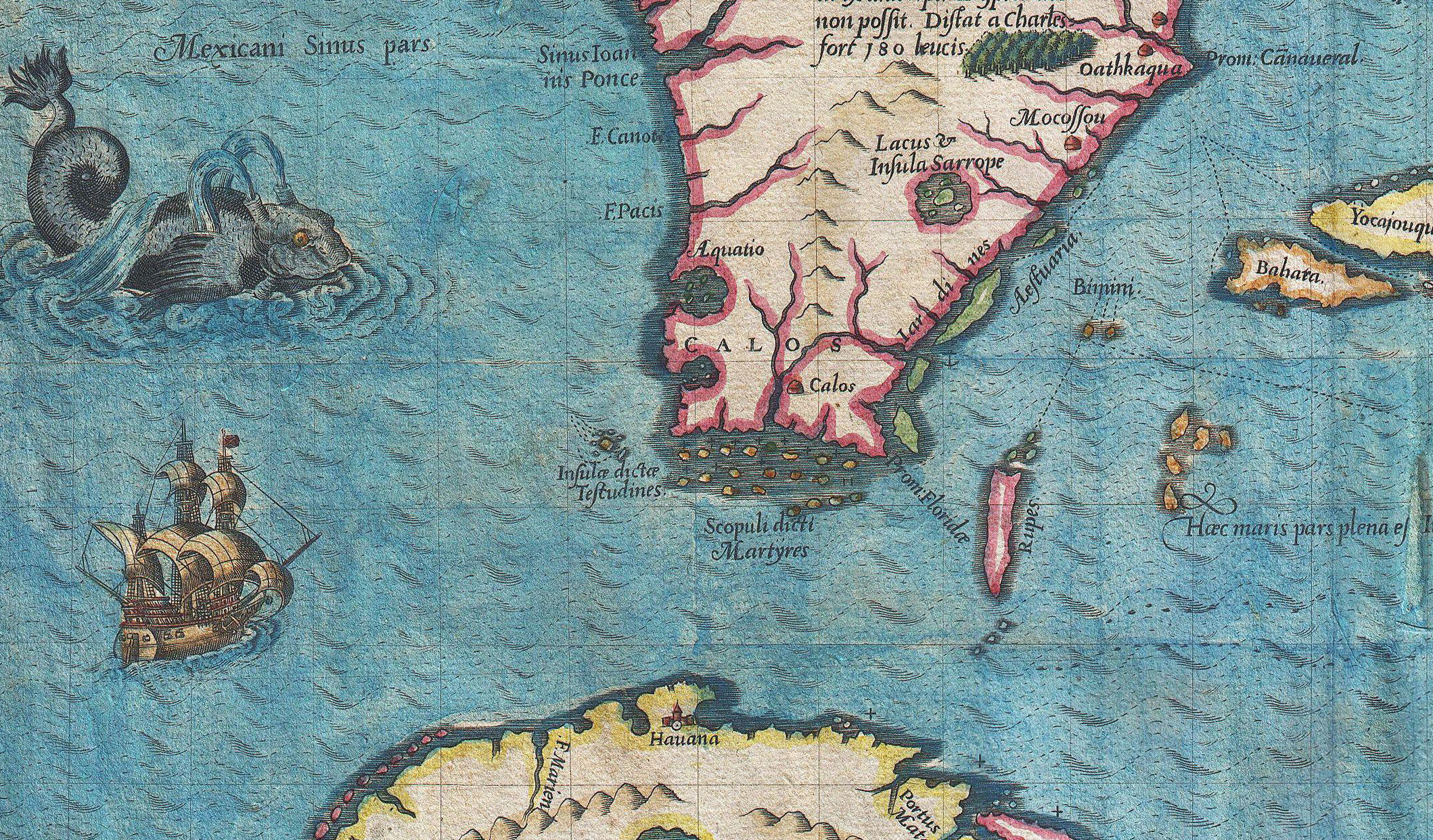
Spanish map of the Florida Keys and Dry Tortugas c., 1591

In his early years he had heard it stated that some eighty or ninety years previous, (probably about the commencement of the eighteenth century) the Indians inhabiting the Islands along the coast, and those on the main land, were of different tribes, and as the Islanders frequently visited the main for the purpose of hunting, a feud arose between the two tribes, and those from the main having made an irruption into the Islands, their inhabitants were driven from island to island until they reached Key West. Here, as they could flee no farther, they were compelled to risk a final battle, which resulted in the almost entire extermination of the islanders. Only a few escaped (and that by a miracle, as they embarked in canoes upon the ocean) whose descendants, it is said, were known to have been met with in the Island of Cuba.

— William A. Whitehead, A Sketch of the History of Key West, Florida, "Address," page 5

Upon discovery, Ponce de León soon claimed the island on behalf of Spain, with possible evidence of trade between Spanish vessels and Key West natives appears throughout the 17th century during Spanish colonization. However, Key West was considered to be of little value to the Spanish Empire, and with the exchange of Florida control from Spain to the Kingdom of Great Britain in 1763, the island fell under English possession. Two explanations have been offered for the origin of the name. Although there is no authentic records of the origin of the name Key West, possible anglicization during British authority likely altered the name of Cayo Hueso ("Bone Cay") to a modified Key West in following years. (Note: Key West may be an anglicized version of the Spanish Cayo Hueso.) Another suggests that it derives from the island's position as the westernmost of the chain of islands—or keys—extending from the Florida mainland, hence the name "Key West." The island's initial surveyor William Whitehead accepted the former theory, saying in a letter: "...hence the name of the island, Cayo Hueso, which the English, with the same facility which enabled them to transform the name of the wine Xeres Seco into 'Sherry Sack,' corrupted into Key West."

With the onset of British control of Florida, Key West became mostly uninhabited, with neither the arriving British nor Spanish exercising de facto control. In 1766, Major general and East Florida governor, James Grant, proposed the idea of establishing a military base on Key West to further regulate any activity in its surrounding waters. Grant often urged that a post or settlement on Key West would be ideally situated for trade with Havana and have a strategic advantage point in the case of a war with Cuba, but nothing came of his plea. After observing fleets of about 30 Cuban and 14 Bahamian fishing vessels in the Florida Keys, Grant became insistent on preventing the intrusion of foreign vessels, as he feared their presence could threaten British control of Florida. Grant consisted of no means to prevent the situation. (Note: In 1763, control of Florida was traded with the British for Spanish authority over Havana. While British officials, including Grant, saw Key West's value for trade in the Florida Straits, the Spanish saw limited use for the island.)

For much of the 18th century, smugglers and privateers used the island to conceal valuables, while Bahamians and Cubans often visited for fishing and other various forms of resource manufacture. British expansion westward in the Thirteen Colonies prompted the immigration south by many of the Creek Indian Nation in the early 1700s. These migrants, who settled much in Florida, came as far as Key West in 1770. Raids by outside natives in the early 1700s, supported and sometimes led by the British, resulted in the destruction of several Spanish missions in Florida. As a result, many of the remaining natives of Key West fled to Cuba. The 1750s and 1760s saw the last Native American residents of Key West, when roughly eighty families of Calusa natives reportedly took refuge on the island in 1763.

== 19th century ==
=== Founding and development ===
During the early 19th century, with neither Spain nor Britain maintaining effective authority over Key West, residents of Havana continued to issue fishing licenses to vessels in the British territory. On 26 August 1815, the Royal Spanish Navy Artillery officer, Juan Pablo Salas, acquired a Spanish land grant of Key West from Juan José de Estrada, the 7th governor of Spanish East Florida, for his "meritorious service to the King of Spain". Six years later on 21 December, 1821, the American businessman from Mobile, Alabama, John W. Simonton offered to purchase Sala's land grant for $2,000. Simonton, who Jefferson B. Browne writes was initially attracted by Key West's "advantageous situation and capacity of the harbor" and its proximity to major shipping lanes, conducted the purchase with Salas while meeting in Havana following Spain's formal cession of Florida to the United States in 1821.

Eager to sell the island, Salas had initially sold Key West for a total of $575 to a former governor of South Carolina, General John Geddes, who was unable to secure the rights before Simonton, assisted by influential friends from Washington D.C., asserted legal claim in January, 1822. During the purchasing process, Simonton was joined by three business partners—John Whitehead, John Fleeming (now spelled Fleming), and Colonel Pardon C. Greene. Soon after the purchase, Simonton sold half of his interest to John Whitehead and John W. Fleeming, both then of Mobile, Alabama. He sold an additional quarter interest to John Warner and John Mountain, whose share was later vested in Greene, who resided on the island. The island was subsequently divided into three separate properties, each allocated to one of these partners. As a result, Simonton, Whitehead, Fleeming, and Greene were hailed the "founding fathers" of Key West by the Keys Weekly Newspapers.

During his business travels between ports in the Gulf of Mexico and the eastern seaboard, John Whitehead often saw Key West but never stopped there. His first visit to the island was unplanned. While sailing from Mobile, Alabama, to New York City, the ship he was on was wrecked in the Straits of Florida. When wrecking crews arrived to salvage cargo from the shipwreck, they transported the passengers, crew, and John Whitehead to Key West. Following his arrival, Whitehead explored the island. Key West's Whitehead Street, which runs roughly north-south through Old Town, is named after John Whitehead. William A. Whitehead, a native of New Jersey, joined his elder brother John in Key West in 1828 and quickly became a prominent figure in the developing community. In 1829, he conducted a survey of the town after Key West received its first government charter. In 1830, Whitehead was appointed collector of customs; during the same year, he was in charge of Key West's port of entry.

On March 25, 1822, Lt. Matthew C. Perry commandeered the USS Shark, a schooner armed with 12 guns, sailed into Key West, and formally claimed the island as de facto property of the United States. Upon claiming the island, Perry renamed Key West to "Thompson's Island" and its harbor "Port Rodgers" in honor of the Secretary of the Navy, Smith Thompson, and War of 1812 hero and President of the Navy Supervisors Board, John Rodgers. Following the signing of the Adams–Onís Treaty in 1819 by Secretary of State, John Quincy Adams, and Foreign Minister of Spain, Luis de Onis, thousands of tracts of coral and Atlantic shallows offshore of the Florida Keys (what now makes up the Florida Reef), was made an extension of U.S. soil. "An Act to Protect the Commerce of the United States, and Crimes of Piracy" was signed into law and authorized by President James Monroe to create a special unit of the Navy, that would be known as the West Indies Squadron, to combat piracy and the slave trade in the waters surrounding Key West and the Florida Keys. Commodore James Biddle was named the squadron's first commander and was assigned a fleet of 14 ships. Biddle employed mostly heavy-drafted ships that proved to be ineffective in the pursuit of pirates who favored shallow-drafted vessels for agile navigation in the shoals and reefs of the West Indies.

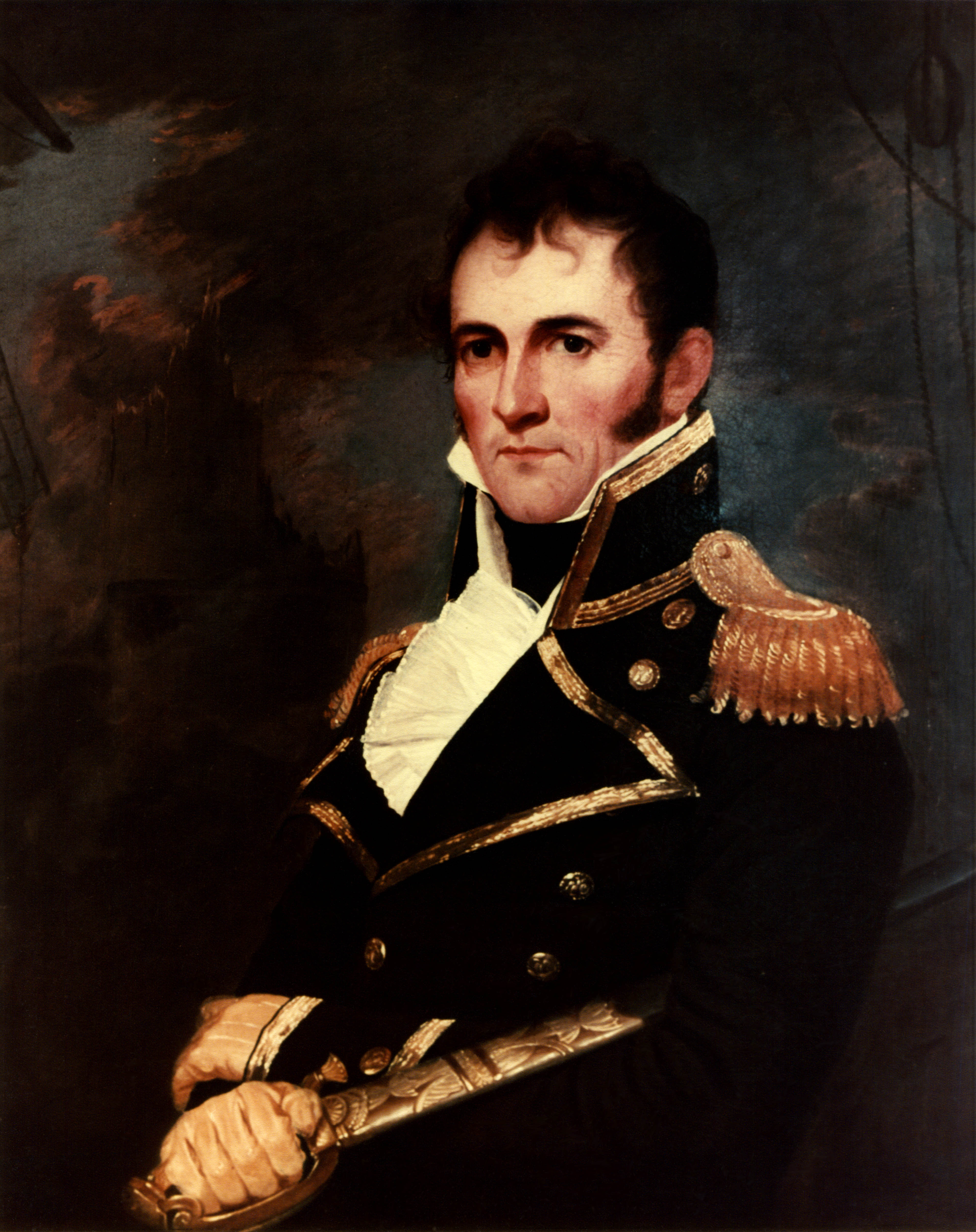
Commodor David Porter (1780–1843). His use of military authority and quasi-dictatorial control in Key West and the surrounding region drew significant official criticism.

In 1823, Secretary Smith Thompson replaced Biddle with Commodore David Porter of the USS Firefly, the flagship of a five-ship squadron tasked with the disruption of British trade in the West Indies, and granted him control over Key West. With a large portion of wealthy merchant fleets operating through the island's ports, the waters of Key West became a significant point of interest for pirates to prey on shipping lanes; to combat the piracy, Porter organized the "Mosquito Fleet": his command of 10 Chesapeake Bay schooners, five swift shallow-drafted vessels, and the steam-powered USS Seagull. Key West's Naval base was established in 1823 (in what is now known as Mallory Square) to avert the theft of the island's merchant vessels. Porter, who ruled Key West under martial law as a military dictator, was delegated the assignment of counter-piracy and control over the island's slave trade. In 1831, Porter noted the strategic value of Key West's military outpost:

A Salute of 17 Guns is to be find at 8 o'clock this morning from the Battery in front of the Town, and the American Ensign is to be hoisted at the Flag Staff.

The town is hereafter called Allenton, and the Battery, Thompsons Battery.

— Commodore David Porter, From the General Order, April 6th 1823, aboard the U.S.S. Peacock, officially honoring American ownership of Key West.

The advantages of Key West's location as a military and naval station has no equal except Gibraltar. ... It commands the outlets of all trade from Jamaica, the Caribbean Sea, the Bay of Honduras, and the Gulf of Mexico, and is a check to the naval forces of whatever nation may hold Cuba.

— Commodore David Porter, "Letter to Congress, December 29, 1829,", Public Documents Printed by Order of the Senate of the United States, First Session of the Twenty-Fourth Congress, vol. V, doc. no. 359 (December 7, 1835), 13–15

=== Early prosperity ===
Porter was court-martialed after invading the town of Fajardo, Puerto Rico and resigned from the U.S. Navy on 18 August, 1826. Two years later, Key West was officially incorporated as United States property in 1828. (Note: The timeline of U.S. and foreign occupation and land claims are described by Homan and Reily in the following: Ponce de Leon claims Key West as Spanish land in 1513; The English lay claim to the island in 1763; Spanish military officer Juan Pablo Salas is granted the land in 1815. Florida is given to the United States in 1819, therefore, loose claims of American property is established; In 1821, John W. Simonton purchases the island from Salas before a U.S. deed could be granted; Matthew C. Perry sails to Key West and claims the island as de facto property of the United States; Key West is officially incorporated as American property in 1828. See Homan & Reily (2000), p. 7) The first act incorporating the "City of Key West" was passed on 8 January, 1828. However, on 8 November, 1828, this act was repealed and replaced by a new one incorporating the "Town of Key West". The island saw extensive growth beginning in the late 1820s, particularly in 1825 with the Federal Wrecking Act prescribing that all property wrecked in US waters be taken to a US port of entry. Between 1823 to 1830, Key West's population rose from nearly 400 to 500 inhabitants. 20 years later, Key West would be home to roughly 2,500 residents.

In 1827, the US Senate passed a bill to establish a territorial court with admiralty jurisdiction at Key West. This legislation initially faced opposition from residents in northern Florida, who had a good chance of blocking it. However, John W. Simonton traveled to Washington, D.C., and presented a formal petition to Congress advocating for the bill's approval. As a result, in 1828, Congress enacted the bill creating a territorial (or federal) court at Key West, known as the "Superior Court," with jurisdiction over the southern part of the territory. Judge James Webb of Georgia was appointed as the first judge of the Superior Court in 1828. He served until his retirement in April 1838, after which he moved to Texas and became a secretary there. He was succeeded in 1839 by Mitam Fain, M.D., who held the position until Florida's admission to the Union in 1845. In 1847, the United States District Court for the Southern District of Florida was established.

Lieutenant Matthew C. Perry (1794–1858), the initial claimant of the island on behalf of the United States, leveraged Key West's location for operations in the Gulf of Mexico while acting as fleet captain for Commodore John Rodgers from 1826 to 1827.

Authority was granted to a board consisting of seven town council members, who were elected by free "white male persons" aged twenty-one or older, provided they had lived within the designated boundaries for a minimum of three months. The council’s president simultaneously acted as mayor, carrying out mayoral responsibilities and also fulfilling the role of justice of the peace for the territory, including collecting associated fees. Besides typical municipal functions, the council uniquely held the power to appoint maritime pilots, oversee pilotage regulations, and enforce laws both from the territory and those locally enacted. In 1832, the incorporated town was replaced by an incorporated city following the issuance of a charter by the territorial council. This charter established the framework for electing a mayor along with six council members. To be eligible to vote, residents had to have lived in the city for at least twelve months. Colonel Oliver O'Hara became the first mayor elected under this new charter.

In 1832, there were eighty-one buildings within the city limits, including storage sheds for wrecked cotton and other goods, as well as blacksmith shops. The two most prominent structures were the warehouses owned by Pardon C. Greene and Fielding A. Browne, each valued at $6,000, including the land and wharfs. In 1835, the territorial council abolished the city charter under circumstances that were unclear to most residents. However, the repeal stipulated that all existing ordinances would remain effective. Upon learning of this, local citizens petitioned Congress to oppose the decision. The Congressional Committee on Territories reviewed the situation and recommended reinstating the charter, leading the territorial council to restore it in 1836.

By request of the US military, Key West later became a strategic position for anti-piracy in the West Indies. Among the first people to immigrate to Key West, the island saw an increase in Bahamian population during the mid 19th century. Their successive involvement in Key West's labor force were contributing factors in the island's growing maritime industries, particularly fishing, sponging, turtling, and shipbuilding. In addition to a number of Bahamian migrants, Key West's population boom throughout the 1830s consisted of newcomers of English descent from the Bahamas, many of whom were relatives of Loyalists who had fled the American Revolution. This influx was complemented by settlers from southern, eastern, and New England states, who established homesteads and contributed to the town's growing diversity. The demographic expansion also included both enslaved and free Blacks, arriving from various parts of the United States and the West Indies.

Constructed in the 1820s on the corner of Caroline and Whitehead Streets, a one-story cedarwood house is recorded as the oldest house in Key West, and among the oldest in South Florida. Around 1832, the home was moved by a mule team to its present location on 322 Duval Street and purchased by Captain Frances Watlington in 1839. The house currently serves as the Wrecker's Museum after being donated to the State of Florida in 1974. As maritime activity around the island increased, the original Key West Lighthouse was built on the southern tip of the island in 1825. After it was destroyed during a hurricane in 1846, a replacement was built further from shoreline to 938 Whitehead Street. Built 56 feet high, it became the third-oldest brick lighthouse in Florida. As multi-storied buildings developed during Key West's economic growth and obscured the Lighthouse's beacon, 20 feet were added to its height. The property was purchased by American politician and then Key West customs collector Stephen Mallory from John Whitehead for $200.

After years of government lobbying for the establishment of military installations in Key West, the historic Fort Zachary Taylor was constructed in 1845 for the purpose of defending the southeast coast of the United States. Designed by US Army Colonel, Joseph Gilmore Totten, and Simon Bernard, the fort was built with a large gunpowder magazine at either end of the barracks and was supported by two artillery batteries, Martello Towers, which still exist as the Martello Gallery-Key West Art and Historical Museum and the West Martello Tower (which now serve as the Key West Garden Club). Originally built in 1861, the first official railroad in Key West was a small track that connected the two Martello Towers with Fort Taylor. Fort Taylor was built on an almost 13-acre island roughly 440 yards off of the southwest shore of Key West. Set in 10 feet of water, the fort was connected to Key West by a 720-foot long wooden drawbridge. Construction of Fort Taylor was frequently hampered by bouts of yellow fever, and less than a year after work began, the hurricane of 11 October, 1846, caused significant damage to the site and resulted in the deaths of four workers. Named for President Zachary Taylor, the fort was built of brick and local coral rock harvested offshore. Construction was completed in 1866, a year after the Civil War ended.

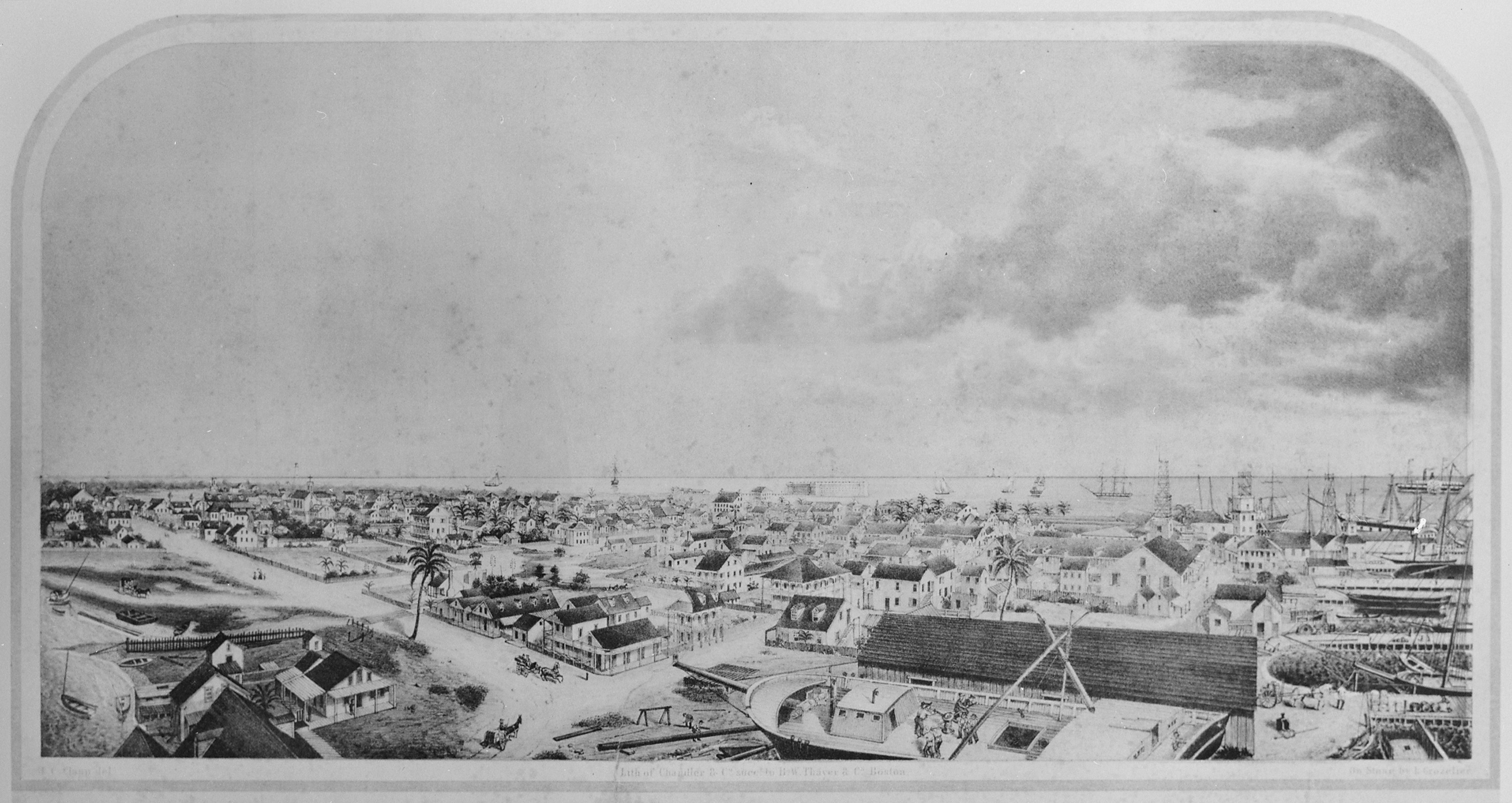
Key West c., 1856

During the Civil War, Fort Zachary Taylor gained the reputation of serving as the "Gibraltar of the Straits of Florida" or the "Gibraltar of the Gulf", referring to its significance in defending U.S. interests against European powers and headquartering the East Gulf Blockading Squadron. Major James Glassel of the U.S. Army dispatched two companies of infantry to Key West in February 1831, establishing soldiers' barracks on the northern side of the island. The encampment was complete with officers' quarters, a guardhouse, and several additional buildings.

The 1840s saw three damaging hurricanes hit Key West. In October 1841, the Key West Hurricane of 1841 brought a storm surge to Key West that was the highest to date in the city's history, driving several ships ashore. Three years later, the Cuban Hurricane of 1844 passed east of Key West, but caused extensive damage to property and ships, with almost ten inches of rain recorded on 5 October. Two years later the 1846 Havana hurricane struck Key West directly on 11 October. The storm surge reached three feet higher than the floors of buildings on Duval Street. The Key West lighthouse and the Sand Key Lighthouse, on an island six miles from Key West, both collapsed, killing more than 20 people who had taken refuge in them. It was reported that only eight houses of some 600 in Key West were undamaged. Two cemeteries were washed out, with open coffins and bones scattered about.

=== Civil War era ===
Prior to the Civil War, increasing concerns of a conflict with the South prompted government officials to organize a seizure of Fort Taylor from Florida's possession. On 11 December, 1860, Lieutenant Colonel Lorenzo Thomas of the U.S. Army, disturbed by the Union's vulnerable position in Key West, reported in the Official Record of the Union and Confederate Armies that:

The present condition of affairs in this State indicates very clearly that Florida, by the act of her people, will succeed from the Federal Government. I have reliable information that as soon as the act is committed an attempt will be made to seize upon Fort Taylor. I therefore request instructions on what I am to do- endeavor at all hazards to prevent Fort Taylor being taken or allow State authorities to have possession.

— Lieut. Col. L. Thomas, The War of the Rebellion: a compilation of the official records of the Union and Confederate armies, chapter 4, page 342

At midnight on Sunday, 13 January, 1861, three days after Florida's secession, Captain James M. Brennan of the 1st US Artillery Regiment transported 44 of his men from the Key West Barracks to Fort Taylor to secure their position from the Confederates. Brennan later sent a message to the central government in Washington requesting reinforcements and the presence of at least one or two warships in the harbor.

Construction of the US military coastal fortress, Fort Jefferson on Garden Key (70 miles west of Key West), began in 1845 after a survey conducted by Commodore John Rodgers in 1829 stated that a military outpost in the Dry Tortugas would provide a strong naval advantage within the Gulf Coast. With the beginning of the Civil War, 62 men of Major Lewis Golding Arnold's Second U.S. Artillery Regiment were transferred to the fort to prevent it from falling into rebel hands. A drill on 26 January, 1861, was performed by the fort's Superintending Engineer, Captain Montgomery C. Meigs, to test the integrity of the post's artillery. The weapon's capabilities proved disappointing, as it took twelve primers to fire two rounds. The vessel, Brooklyn, anchored briefly on Garden Key on 2 February to unload twelve mountain howitzers before traveling to Pensacola. 160 soldiers of Col. Bill Wilson's 6th New York Infantry Regiment was transferred to Fort Jefferson on 4 July, 1861. New York soldiers were relieved in March 1862 when the 7th New Hampshire Volunteer Infantry arrived under the command of Col. Haldimand S. Putnam. New Hampshire soldiers were relieved in June 1862 with the arrival of the 90th New York Volunteer Infantry Regiment under the command of Lt. Col. Louis W. Tinelli. New York soldiers were replaced with the 47th Pennsylvania Infantry Regiment in December 1862. Two years later, the 110th New York Volunteer Infantry arrived in March 1864. After being convicted of conspiracy for housing assassin John Wilkes Booth, Dr. Samual A. Mudd was among the fort's most infamous prisoners.

Key West later became an important outpost for suppressing blockade runners, with the Union Navy using their strategic position as an operations headquarters for their East Gulf Blockading Squadron. Through the course of the war, the Union Blockade captured and imprisoned about 299 captured blockade runners, as well civilians whom were disloyal to the Union, in Fort Zachary Taylor. For the duration of the war, Key West stood as a stronghold for the Union's prevention of resource transport to the Confederacy through South Florida. 199 ships were captured by the blockade. Key West's salt production industry was temporarily shut down by the Union after an increase in Confederate sympathizers smuggling the product to the south.

=== Postbellum period ===
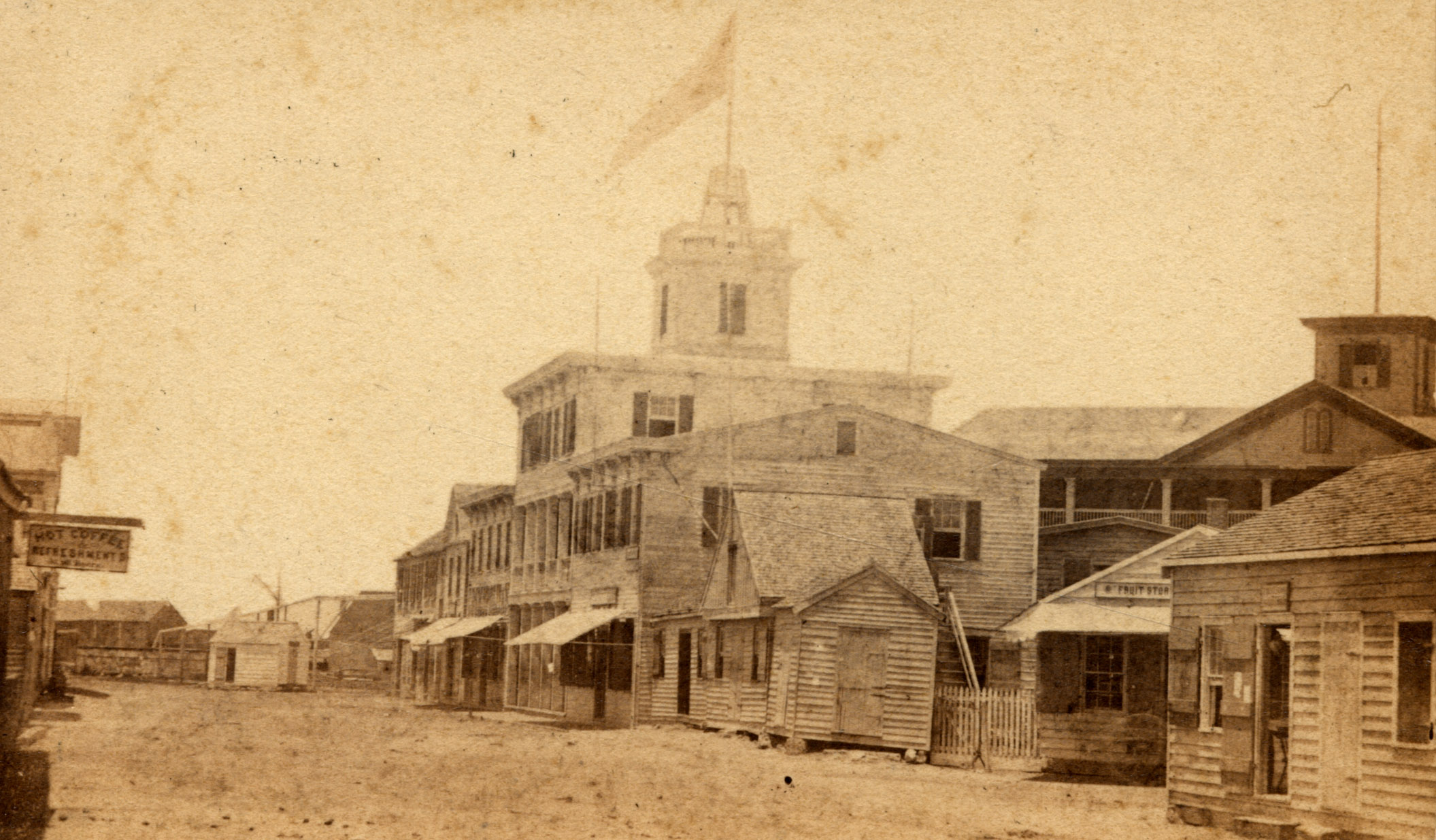
Image of Front Street in Old Town, Key West c., 1860

During the unsuccessful Ten Years' War for Cuban independence in the 1860s and 1870s, Key West became a major site for Cuban refugees. On 11 November, 1871, a Cuban heritage center and museum, the San Carlos Institute, was founded by members of Key West's exile community on Anne Street in Old Town. The institute served as a center for organizing efforts in support of Cuban independence from Spain. Key West community leaders José Dolores Poyo and Juan María Reyes proposed the creation of the organization to promote Cuban cultural identity and nationalist ideals. In his first visit to Key West, Cuban revolutionary José Martí addressed a large gathering at the institute on 3 January, 1892, and announced the formation of a united front to lead the effort for Cuban independence.

At the time, while the Spanish Empire was engaged in a conflict with Cuban revolutionaries, financial and material assistance routed through Key West was crucial. The island's cigar industry was integral to this support network, processing Cuban tobacco and facilitating the flow of funds to insurgent forces. According to speculative historical interpretations, by targeting Key West's cigar factories, Spanish authorities sought to disrupt a principal source of funding for the revolutionaries, thereby impairing their operational capabilities. Key West represented a primary conduit for revolutionary support, with limited alternative channels available. In 1874, the San Carlos Institute moved to a much larger facility on Fleming Street before it was ultimately destroyed in the City's fire of 1886. After its replacement was demolished by a hurricane in 1914, the institute was rebuilt at its present location on Duval Street.

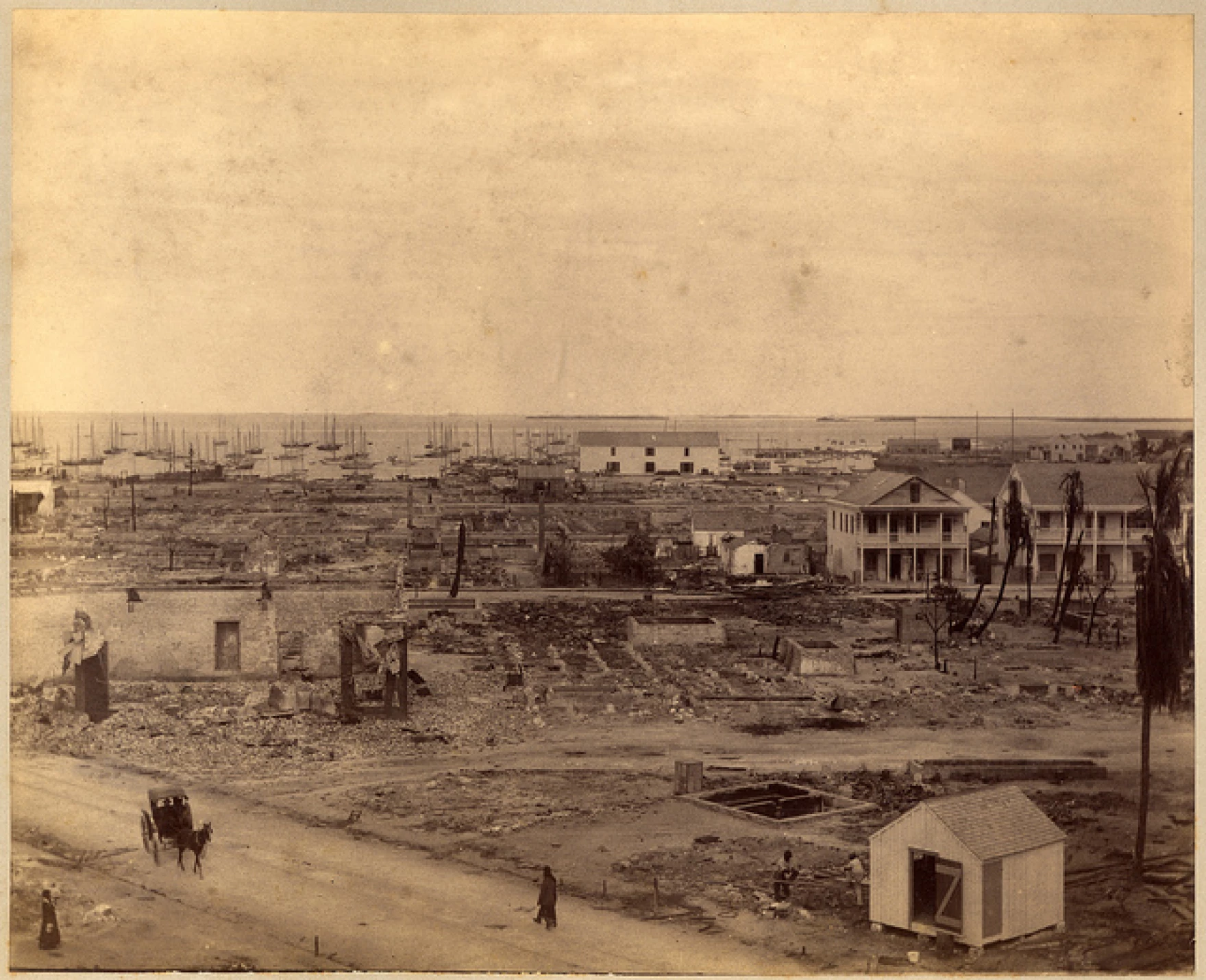
Photograph of the few remaining buildings left in a Key West neighborhood after the fire

The island's subsequent rise in Cigar manufacturing and relocation of factories from Cuba were largely destroyed in Key West's devastating fire of 1 April, 1886. The fire was one of the most catastrophic events in the island's history, resulting in the death of seven citizens and $1.5 Million in property damage across 50 acres [CONVERT] of land. The origin of the fire was discovered to be at the San Carlos Institute by a watchman at approximately 1:45 a.m. on 30 March. Propelled by the wind, the blaze quickly spread to adjoining buildings and throughout the town, destroying the Episcopal and Baptist churches, the Masonic Hall, several cigar factories, and the bonded warehouse containing nearly a quarter-million dollars’ worth of tobacco. With the city's cisterns largely dry and no functioning water supply, officers from the U.S. Navy steamers Brooklyn and Powhatan resorted to demolishing buildings with explosives in an attempt to stop the fire. The flames soon reached the business district, consuming structures filled with valuable merchandise. The 12-hour-long fire was battled by three of the City's volunteer fire companies under the command of Fire Chief Benjamin Franklin H. Bowers, along with aid from local military personnel. The heat from the blaze was so intense that firefighters were frequently forced to retreat. Combined with a lack of equipment and water, these conditions led to the destruction of much of the town's core. A total of six wharves and five brick warehouses were destroyed.

On January 24, 1889, the USS Maine left Key West for Havana to protect American interests in Cuba and conduct winter naval exercises in the Gulf of Mexico during the Cuban War of Independence. Prior to its voyage to Havana, the Maine loaded coal to Fort Jefferson. Three weeks later on the night of February 15, 1889, while anchored at the Havana Harbor, an explosion occurred on the Maine's bow after more than 5 tons of gunpowder charges for the vessel's forward batteries had detonated. 251 enlisted sailors of the ship's crew of 355 men were killed. The incident led to an increase in tensions between the United States and Spain. A U.S. Naval inquiry led by Captain William T. Sampson was conducted in the Key West Customs House to investigate the cause of the blast. Upon ruling that the explosion had occurred from an external torpedo detonation, the United States declared war on Spain on 25 April, 1898, marking the onset of the Spanish-American War. Shortly after the incident in Havana, the U.S. Navy began increased efforts to prepare Key West for military base use. Large stocks of ammunition and coal were sent to Key West to strengthen fortifications; Fort Zachary Taylor was supplied with two 12-inch M1895 guns for south Battery Osceola and Four 3-inch M1898 15-pounder rapid-fire rifles to Battery Adair.

Beginning in 1885, trolleys operated by the Key West Street Car Company served as a primary mode of transportation throughout Key West. Later, tours of the island were performed aboard electric railway cars run by the Key West Electric Company. Although the Key West Extension of the Florida East Coast Railway ceased operations following partial destruction by a hurricane in 1935, the Conch Tour Train now functions as the closest experience to a railway in Key West.

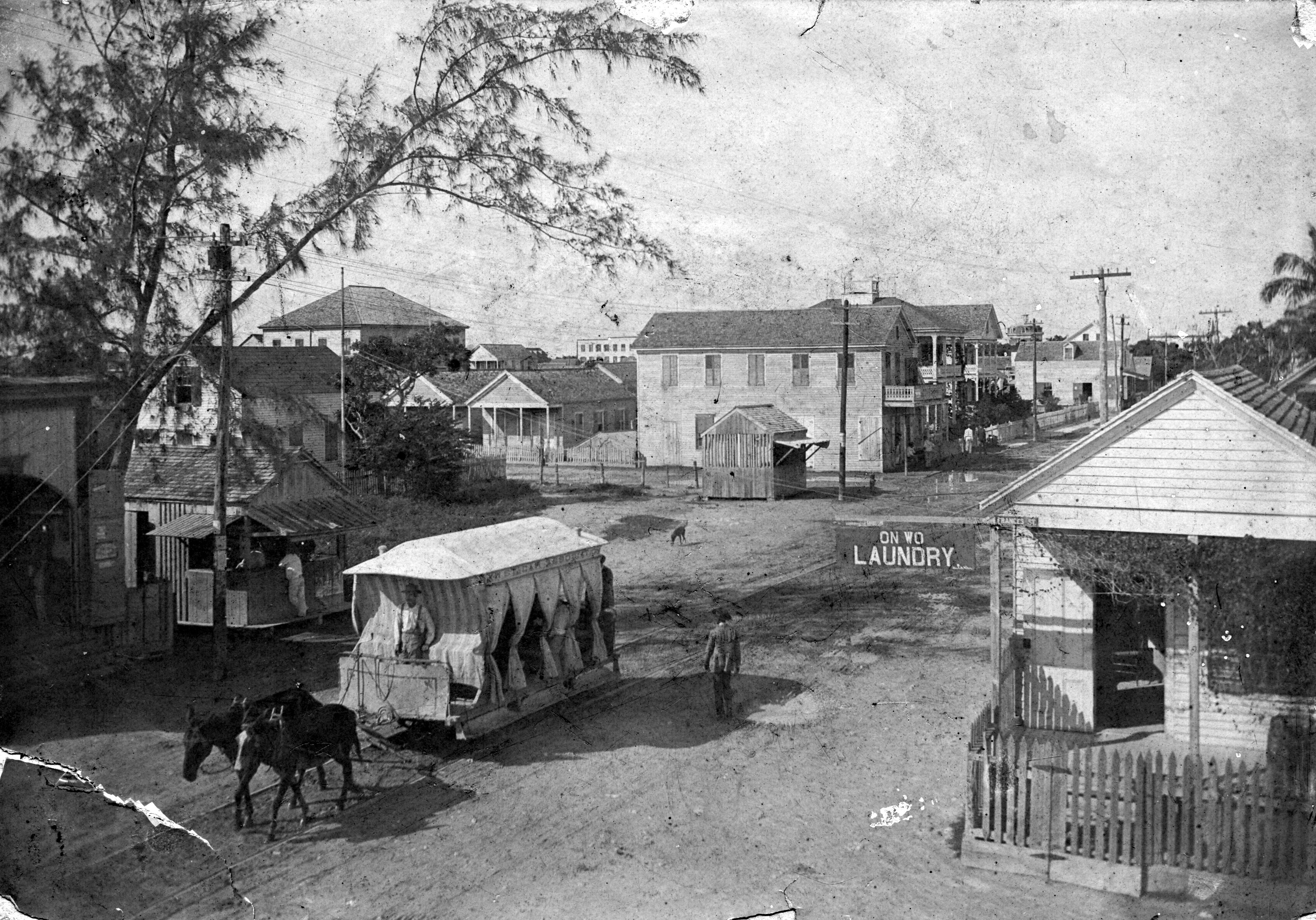
Horse-drawn trolley and On Wo Chinese Laundry on Division Street (now Truman Avenue) at the corner of Frances Street, circa 1890.

Before ice was manufactured locally in 1890, ships imported natural ice to Key West from New England, with local salvager and entrepreneur Asa Tift constructing an icehouse beside the ship chandlery and cisterns originally built by A.C. Tift & Company. The ship chandlery was originally constructed in 1879 by salvager William H. Wall to serve as the warehouse for Wall & Company. The building was one of the earliest brick structures to be erected in Key West, and in 1884, Wall sold the nearly 154-foot-long building to Tift, who turned it into the waterfront chandlery. The former chandlery now serves as the chamber of commerce, while the former icehouse serves the Shell Warehouse.

Construction of Key West's U.S. Customs House began in 1889 besides the wharf to house federal offices of the courts, customs, postal, and lighthouse services. Designed by the Irish-born architect William Kerr from Ballyboley, County Down, local materials and labor on the island were scarce, so nearly 1 million bricks were needed to be transported from New York and iron was imported from Pennsylvania. The total cost of construction was $108,000, approximately $3.49 million as of 2026.

On May 7, 1898, the U.S. Navy's Atlantic Fleet was moved to Key West by Commodore George C. Remey of the USS Lancaster for the remainder of the war. With the arrival of the Navy on Key West during the height of the conflict, numerous affairs were made to prepare the island for base use. Coal bunkers large enough to hold 15,000 tons of coal were dug throughout Key West. Coal was temporarily stored in sail barges in the harbor while coal bunkers were undergoing construction. Additionally, intensive dredging of the island's harbor had been conducted by the Army to extend military fortification off Key West's shore; private owners of docks, warehouses, and wharves, leased their properties to the military to help with war efforts, and high explosives and ammunition were stored in a number of newly built ordnance depots.

Following the sinking of the USS Maine in the Havana Harbor, roughly 24 bodies were buried the same year at the Key West's City Cemetery on 1 March 1898. A funeral was performed by Captain Bowman H. McCalla of the USS Marblehead and a statue memorial was erected in 1898 by the Encampment Union Veterans Legion, Washington D.C.

== 20th century ==
=== Flagler era ===
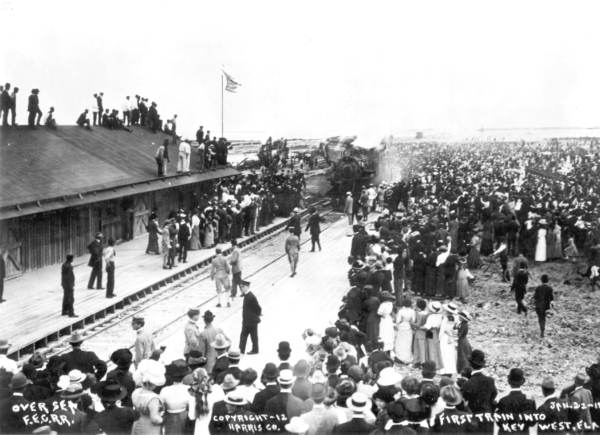
First Florida East Coast Railway train arriving in Key West in 1912

With the turn of the century came Key West's rapid growth following the extension of Henry M. Flagler's Florida East Coast Railway (FEC), connecting Key West with the Florida mainland via the newly constructed Overseas Railroad. After initially becoming interested in connecting Key West to the mainland following the announcement in 1905 of the construction of the Panama Canal, Flagler partnered with project engineer James Meredith to establish a railway south through the Florida Keys. Throughout the course of seven years of construction, Flagler employed as a much as 4,000 workers and spent roughly $50 million in 17 million cubic yards of material for construction efforts. Several hurricanes in the early 20th century threatened to halt the project, including the devastating 1909 Florida Keys hurricane and 1910 Cuba hurricane the following year. The project was finally completed in 1912 and was hailed the 8th wonder of the world by some residents, stretching 128 miles (206 km) from Homestead to Key West.

Both the 1909 and 1910 hurricanes caused significant damage to Key West. On 11 October 1909, winds reached up to 94 miles per hour, with 8–10 inches of rainfall. More than 400 buildings were displaced by the storm surge or collapsed due to the high winds; the weather bureau building on Sand Key was also swept out to sea, along with sections of the Overseas Railroad that were still under construction. Fifteen people were confirmed dead as a result of the storm, and over 300 boats were destroyed in the island's Harbor, resulting in a total of $1 million in damages accumulated from the hurricane.

On January 22, 1912, the Extension Special was the first train to arrive in Key West in the island's history. Arriving in his private railcar, Henry Flagler was welcomed by local residents bands and a celebratory parade. The following year, Flagler died at the age of 83 from tuberculosis. Regarded as one of the most intense hurricanes to strike the United States, the 1935 Labor Day hurricane caused extensive damage to the Overseas Railroad. As a result, the line was sold by the Florida East Coast Railway to Monroe County and the State of Florida for $640,000. Wind gusts were measured reaching as high as 150 to 200 miles per hour. In Islamorada, approximately 35 miles of railroad track were destroyed by storm tides reaching 18 to 20 feet. A rescue train was swept off the tracks, and nearly 300 World War I veterans, employed through a federal relief program, were killed in the storm. Three years later, the U.S. government rebuilt Flagler's railroad as an automobile highway as an extension of U.S. Route 1, becoming the Overseas Highway in 1938.

On December 18, 1917 the establishment of Key West's Naval Air Station was commissioned with U.S. Coast Guard Lieutenant Stanley Parker as commanding officer. The base soon became a major center for U.S. Naval aviation training and, equipped with a fleet of seaplanes and blimps, trained roughly 500 naval aviators during the First World War. Trumbo Point was originally built in 1912 to accommodate construction imports for the extension of the Florida East Coast Railway. However, with the acquisition by the U.S. Navy in 1917, the site was used as a seaplane base for the duration of the war. An early submarine base on Key West was established in the Fort Taylor Annex (what is now known as the Truman Annex). Thomas Edison resided in a home on the base in Key West for 6 months while developing 41 weapons for the US war effort and developing underwater ordinance for the Navy. The base was assigned the task of supplying U.S. fleets with oil and blocking German Naval vessels from reaching Mexican oil supplies.

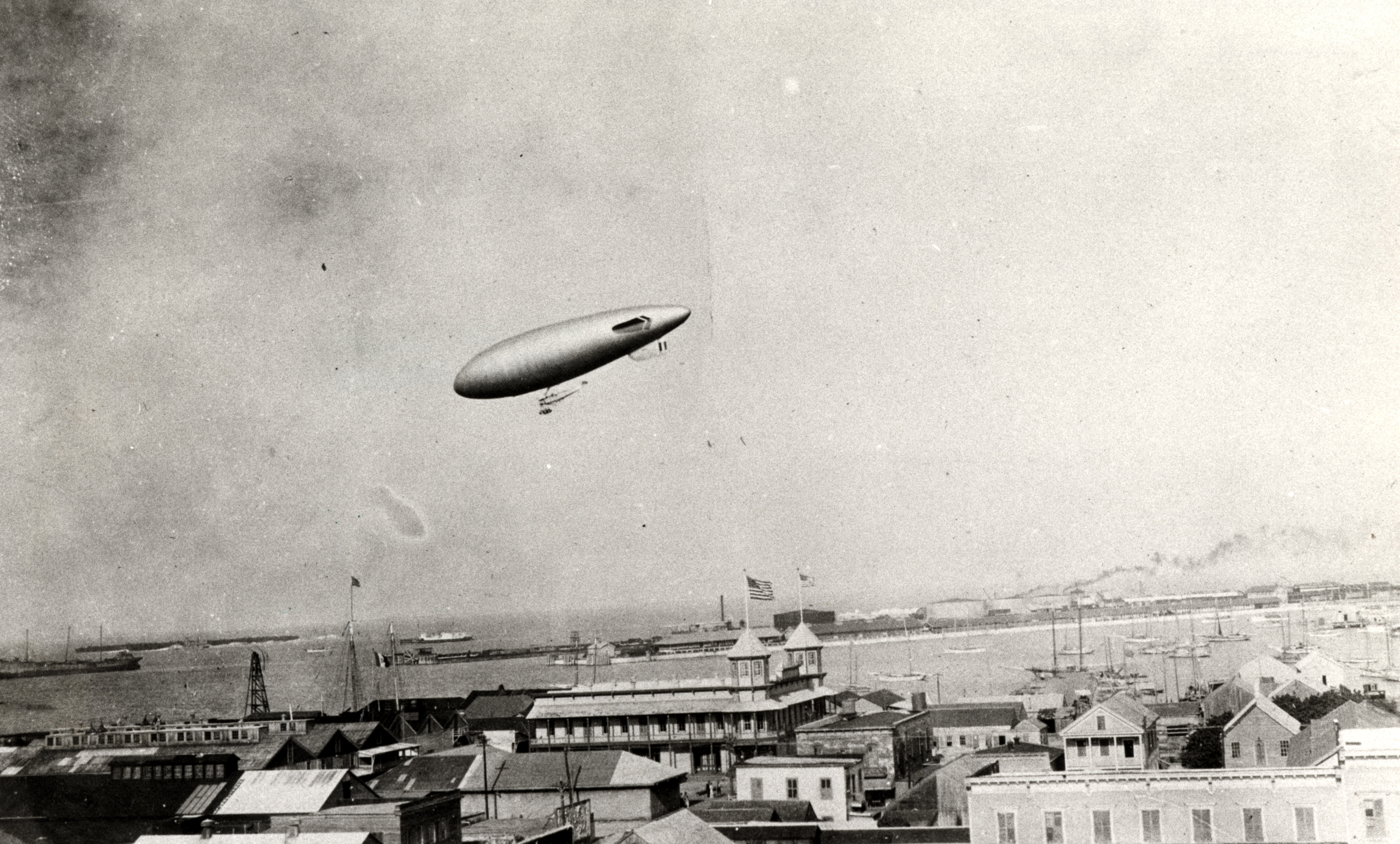
View of Front Street and Trumbo Pier from the Jefferson Hotel during World War I.

Key West's Naval stations saw extensive expansion with the onset of the First World War. A year after the outbreak of World War I in 1915, the Naval Station on Boca Chica Key included 101 acres, 55 buildings, coal sheds with a 50,000-ton capacity, a machine shop, a marine railway with a 750-ton capacity, a small hospital, and 100 to 300 personnel of civilian workforce. A landfill was used for the construction of Key West's Flemming Key to hold a number of the island's military installations. On July 13, 1917, three months after the United States' entry into World War I, land rented from the F.E.C Railway, what is now known as Trumbo Point, was used for the construction of a new coastal air patrol station. The land consisted of a dredging contract with 134 acres of landfill pumped up from the water's bottom. On 22 September, a Curtis N-9 seaplane was piloted by U.S. Coast Guard Lieutenant Stanley Parker and was logged as the first naval flight from Key West. Numerous U.S. Naval destroyers, submarines, submarine chasers, and patrol vessels conducted training and patrol operations off the coast of Key West from the Naval Station and from a Section Base in downtown near Duval Street.

With World War I drawing to a close in 1918, Key West's submarine and air station were decommissioned with multiple buildings at the Trumbo Annex being dismantled. Military activity in Key West greatly decreased following the end of the war, with the island's facilities mainly being used for minor seaplane training. A radio wireless station was established in the Truman Annex and was used by the Navy throughout the 1920-30s. A project initiated in 1917 to construct a submarine basin on the island's harbor was finished in 1920 and saw frequent use with the beginning of the 1940s. Military activity in Key West slowly re-emerged with an increase in sightings of German U-boat presence off the Gulf of Mexico and the Florida Keys. In 1939, the United States Lighthouse Service merged with the Coast Guard, establishing the island's Captain of the Port Key West.

In 1926, Carl Tänzler emigrated from Germany to the United States, eventually settling in Florida. Adopting the name Carl von Cosel, he became employed as a radiology technician at the U.S. Marine Hospital in Key West. On 22 April, 1930, von Cosel examined a young Cuban–American patient, Maria Elena Milagro de Hoyos, who had been diagnosed with tuberculosis. Captivated by her appearance and believing she was the woman foretold to him in visions during his youth, von Cosel developed an obsessive infatuation. Despite her worsening condition and repeated treatments administered by von Cosel, Hoyos died in October 1931. After removing her body from the Key West Cemetery in 1933, von Cosel brought it to his makeshift laboratory and later moved it into the airplane-shaped structure in his backyard, where he lived with the preserved corpse until 1940, when his actions were discovered by Elena's family and authorities. This case has since become widely recounted in local histories.

On 19 July 1927 the newly founded airline Pan American Airways (Pan Am) received a mail contract authorizing flights between Key West and Havana. The first of these flights occurred on 19 October when the Fairchild FC-2 float plane La Nina was chartered by Pan Am to fly from Key West to Havana. As construction commenced on a company-commissioned runway at Meacham Field, Pan Am expanded its Key West fleet with the addition of three Fokker F-VII trimotor aircraft. Scheduled mail flights officially began on 28 October, 1927. On 16 January, 1928, Pan American Airways expanded its operations to include regular passenger service between Key West and Havana, with a one-way fare of $50 for a 75-minute flight.

=== Great Depression ===
During the Great Depression, Key West's municipal government had issued revenue bonds, backed by anticipated tax revenues or service fees, to finance essential public services and infrastructure. By around 1933, the city had defaulted on several million dollars in bonded debt, using up available tax revenue and unable to cover interest or principal payments. When the economic collapse severely reduced tax collections, the city became unable to honor its bond commitments. The following years brought Key West's largest economic strife; by 1934, historian Stuart McIver described the island as among "the poorest cities in America", as roughly three-quarters of 11,000 residents were receiving government financial aid, and its per capita monthly income dropped to less than $7.00. In July the same year, Governor David Sholtz declared a state of emergency in Key West and put the city under the control of the Federal Emergency Relief Administration (FERA). He appointed the head of head of the Federal Emergency Relief Administration for the Southeastern United States, Julius F. Stone Jr., to oversee the city's recovery efforts. Stone led the Key West Administration, a local body tasked with managing relief and redevelopment funded by federal allocations (approximately $1 million for the first 18 months).

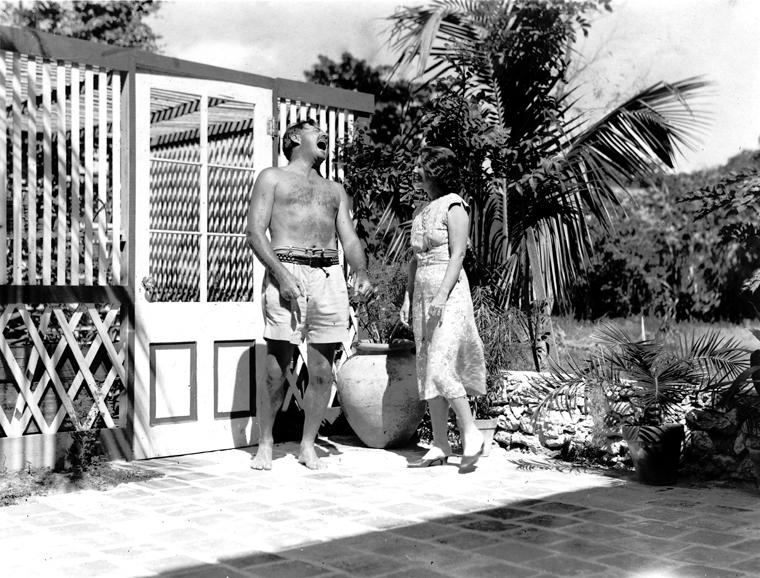
Ernest Hemingway with wife Pauline on the house's grounds in Key West c., the 1930s.

Ernest Hemingway and his wife Pauline Pfeiffer moved to Key West in 1928 in home on 907 Whitehead Street, first built in 1848 by marine architect and salvage wrecker, Asa Tift. Pauline had first gained interest in the home while staying two-story home at 1301 Whitehead Street and eventually purchased the property for $8,000. Ernest used the property's carriage house as a writing studio, valuing the property's seclusion for his works. Pauline's addition of a swimming pool in 1937 was the first pool ever built in Key West. Ernest's 1935 non-fiction Green Hills of Africa, 1936 short stories "The Snows of Kilimanjaro", and "The Short Happy Life of Francis Macomber", were some of his most notable works written in Key West. Following their divorce in 1940, Pauline continued to live in the house until her death in 1951. The manuscripts of Ernest's 1970 posthumous novel, Islands in the Stream, were discovered in the property's garage. Upon returning to Key West, Ernest Hemingway began to work on the draft of his novel, A Farewell to Arms. In 1937, he published To Have and Have Not, written and set largely in Key West inside his home on Whitehead Street. Film adaptations, including To Have and Have Not (1944) and The Rose Tattoo (1955), set in Key West soon earned the island's reputation as an artistic haven.

=== World War II ===
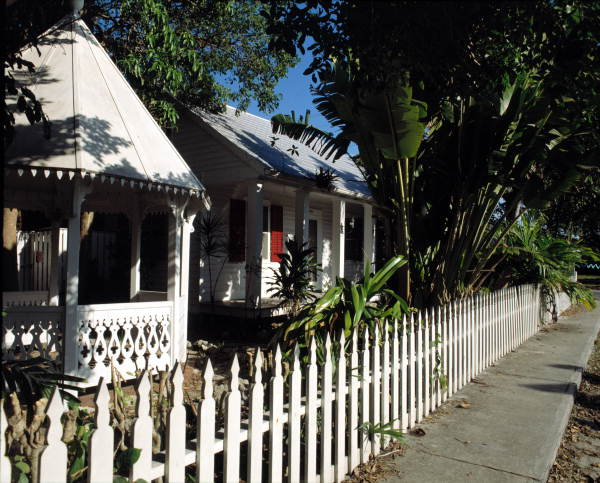
Tennessee Williams' house at 1431 Duncan Street

Playwright Tennessee Williams first visited Key West in 1941, and eight years later, bought a home on 1431 Duncan Street in 1949. He stayed in the Key West property intermittently for 30 years until his death in 1983. Before purchasing the home, Williams worked from a succession of guest houses on the island, the La Concha Hotel, where he reportedly completed an early manuscript for A Streetcar Named Desire (1947) titled "Poker Night", and eventually wrote from storage shed studio in his Duncan Street home which he referred to as "the madhouse." The honorary Tennessee Williams Fine Arts Center (later known as Tennessee Williams Theater) was opened on the island in 1980 with a premiere of Williams' play, Will Mr. Merriweather Return from Memphis?

With the onset of World War II more than 14,000 ships were brought into the island's harbor; an almost doubling population occurred with arrival soldiers, sailors, laborers, and tourists. German U-boat operations occurred so close to Key West throughout the 1940s that locals often reported witnessing the burning wreckage of allied cargo and military freighters from the island's shore.

"Meachum Field "(located in what is now known as Key West International Airport) was constructed as an additional satellite facility in 1940 to support blimps running anti-submarine patrols. In the same year, personnel from the Atlantic Fleet Sound School in New London, Connecticut, were transferred to the Naval Station, Key West, to create the Fleet Sonar School in the Truman Annex, tasked with training sonar operators to wage anti-submarine warfare against German hostiles. Following the end of the World War II, operations at Submarine Squadron 4 were transferred from Pearl Harbor to Key West in August 1945 as part of the U.S. Atlantic Fleet. The squadron was assigned commanding officers, Captains Edward S. Hutchinson and Lawrence Randall Daspit, respectively. The base was equipped with a fleet of one Fulton-class submarine tender, the USS Howard W. Gilmore (AS-16), one Chanticleer-class submarine rescue ship, the USS Petrel (ASR-14), a Balao-class submarine, the USS Clamagore (SS-343), which served as the squadrons flagship from January 1946 to 1 August, 1959.

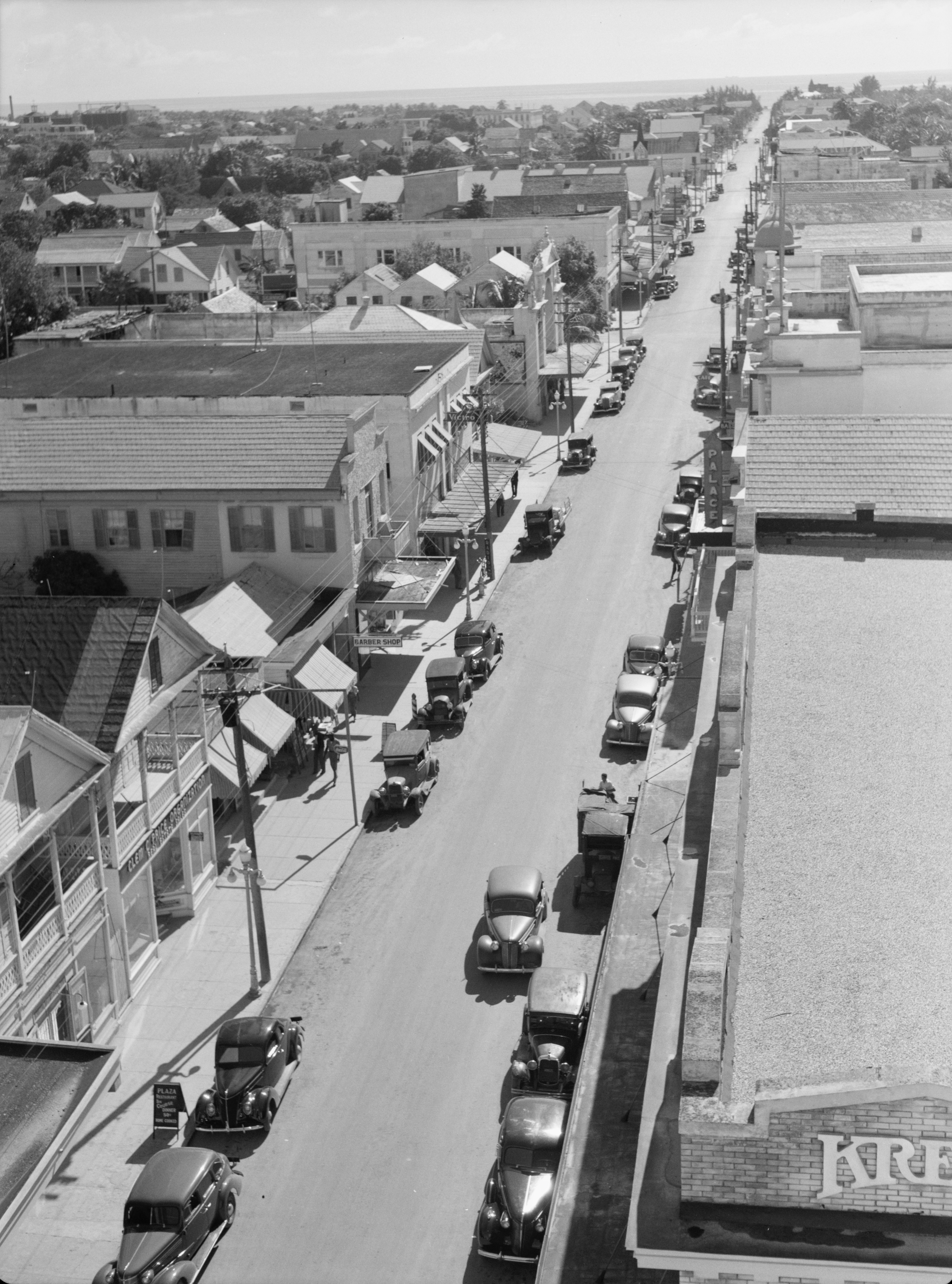
Duval Street in 1938

Following the Japanese surprise attack on the Pacific Fleet in Pearl Harbor in 1942, wartime efforts in Key West were immediately resumed with the United States' entry into World War II. Only four days after the U.S. declared war on Japan on 12 December, 1942, Operation Paukenschlag, commanded by Karl Doenitz, was ordered by Adolf Hitler to begin an extensive U-boat campaign within the American coasts, a large portion of which occurred offshore Key West. Blackouts were frequently imposed by the Navy to prevent warships from being identified. A practice blackout conducted on 11 January, 1942, formed a 300-mile-long stretch of darkness from Stuart, Florida, to Key West along the Florida coastline. On 6 February, 1942, the Gulf Sea Frontier (GSF), a U.S. Navy command tasked with defending the Straits of Florida and the Gulf of Mexico, was headquartered in Key West. On the night of 18 July, 1943, a K-74 navy blimp engaged in battle with a U-134 German submarine forty miles southwest of Key West.

As relations between the U.S. and the Soviet Union deteriorated with the beginning of the Cold War, President Harry S. Truman made 11 trips to Key West to organize military defense plans while staying at the Little White House. In March 1948, Truman met with the Chiefs of the Armed Forces and the Department of Defense in Key West to discuss military fortification plans, known as the Key West Agreement. The agreement gave the U.S. Navy, Army, and Air force in increase of control over their aviation assets for reconnaissance, medical evacuation, and other tactical functions for the island's defense.

=== Cold War period ===
With the establishment of Fidel Castro's regime after the Cuban Revolution in 1959, growing concerns over Soviet activity in Cuba led government officials to direct operations from South Florida military installations such as Homestead Air Force Base, Opa-Locka Marine Air Station, and the various U.S. Navy facilities in Key West. Throughout the 1950s, more than 20,000 naval personnel and over 3,000 sonar operators were trained in Key West. Important factors such as the island's advantageous water and climate conditions allowed for submarine operations to be conducted year round with minimal cancellations; Key West's stable water temperatures made sonar conditionals fairly predictable.

After Soviet nuclear missile sites were discovered in Cuba, on October 15, 1962, large numbers of troops and aircraft quickly arrived in Key West, and naval destroyers and submarines stationed in the harbor were dispatched out to sea. Within just a few days, Key West's military population surged from roughly 3,000 to 12,000 as U.S. forces mobilized in response to the crisis. On 22 October, President John F. Kennedy announced a naval and air "quarantine" of Cuba to prevent further delivery of Soviet missiles. During the height of the Cuban Missile Crisis, Key West transformed into a heavily fortified military zone. Army units reinforced the shoreline with barbed-wire and sandbag barricades, machine gun emplacements, and six Hawk missile antiaircraft batteries. Marines secured the perimeter while additional troops guarded bridges and critical infrastructure across the Keys to prevent sabotage. The historic Casa Marina Hotel was repurposed as an Army command post and housed approximately 500 soldiers. Meanwhile, Air Force, Navy, and Marine aircraft conducted hundreds of sorties from the nearby Boca Chica Naval Air Station and later from Key West International Airport, maintaining air surveillance and readiness throughout the crisis. After the naval and air quarantine of Cuba was lifted on 20 November, President John F. Kennedy and the Joint Chiefs of Staff convened at the Key West Naval Station, marking the first time such a high-level meeting occurred outside of Washington.

Musician Jimmy Buffett first visited Key West in November 1971 with singer-songwriter Jerry Jeff Walker, known for his hit "Mr. Bojangles," and Walker's partner Teresa "Murphy" Clark. The two had previously offered Buffett shelter in their open-air home in Coconut Grove after he left Nashville, Tennessee, seeking escape from both its climate and music industry pressures. At the time, the 25-year-old Buffett was recovering from the recent end of his marriage to his first wife and series of professional setbacks in Nashville. Walker and Clark, hoping to lift his spirits, invited him to Key West on busking trip. Buffett enjoyed the island so much that he decided to move there in the spring of 1972. By that time, Key West had become a popular destination for numerous writers, actors, and musicians. Buffett rented a second-floor apartment, which he eventually loaned to journalist Hunter S. Thompson. Writer Thomas McGuane, who would later become Buffett's brother-in-law, moved to Key West around 1970 with his then-wife, Becky, and their son. McGuane and fellow writer Jim Harrison, together with painter Russell Chatham, Richard Brautigan, and French sportsman Guy de la Valdène, formed a close inner-circle in Key West during the 1970s. They often spent their days fishing and their evenings socializing in the local bar scene. One of the most popular haunts frequented by the local artists in Key West was the hotel-room-turned-bar called the Chart Room on Duval Street. Writer and later bartender at the Chart Room, Tom Corcoran, reportedly served Jimmy Buffett his first beer in Key West at the bar, where Buffett also performed for local patrons including musician Jim Croce, Thompson, McGuane, Walker, and Corcoran himself.

But there's a whole wave of people coming in thinking ‘This is the greatest place I’ve ever been.’ The only thing that has really changed from the standpoint of young artists is that it's not a cheap place anymore. I was talking to somebody that said there's a problem down there with young people stealing the sails off sailboats so they’d have something to sleep under. But for the department of tourism in Florida, Key West still gets more inquiries than any other place in Florida except Disneyland.

— Novelist Thomas McGuane

=== 1980s ===
An informal secession from the United States occurred in 1982 in Key West in response to a United States Border Patrol roadblock and inspection point on US 1. Numerous protests were sparked by the lack of accessibility into the Card Sound Bridge within the merger of Monroe County Road 905A/Miami-Dade County Road 905A where a Border Patrol checkpoint had been performing a narcotics and illegal immigrant search. After several failed complaints by the Key West City Council claiming that the roadblock would damage the island's tourism industry, Mayor Dennis Wardlow and the council declared Key West as an independent micronation on 23 April, 1982.

== 21st century ==
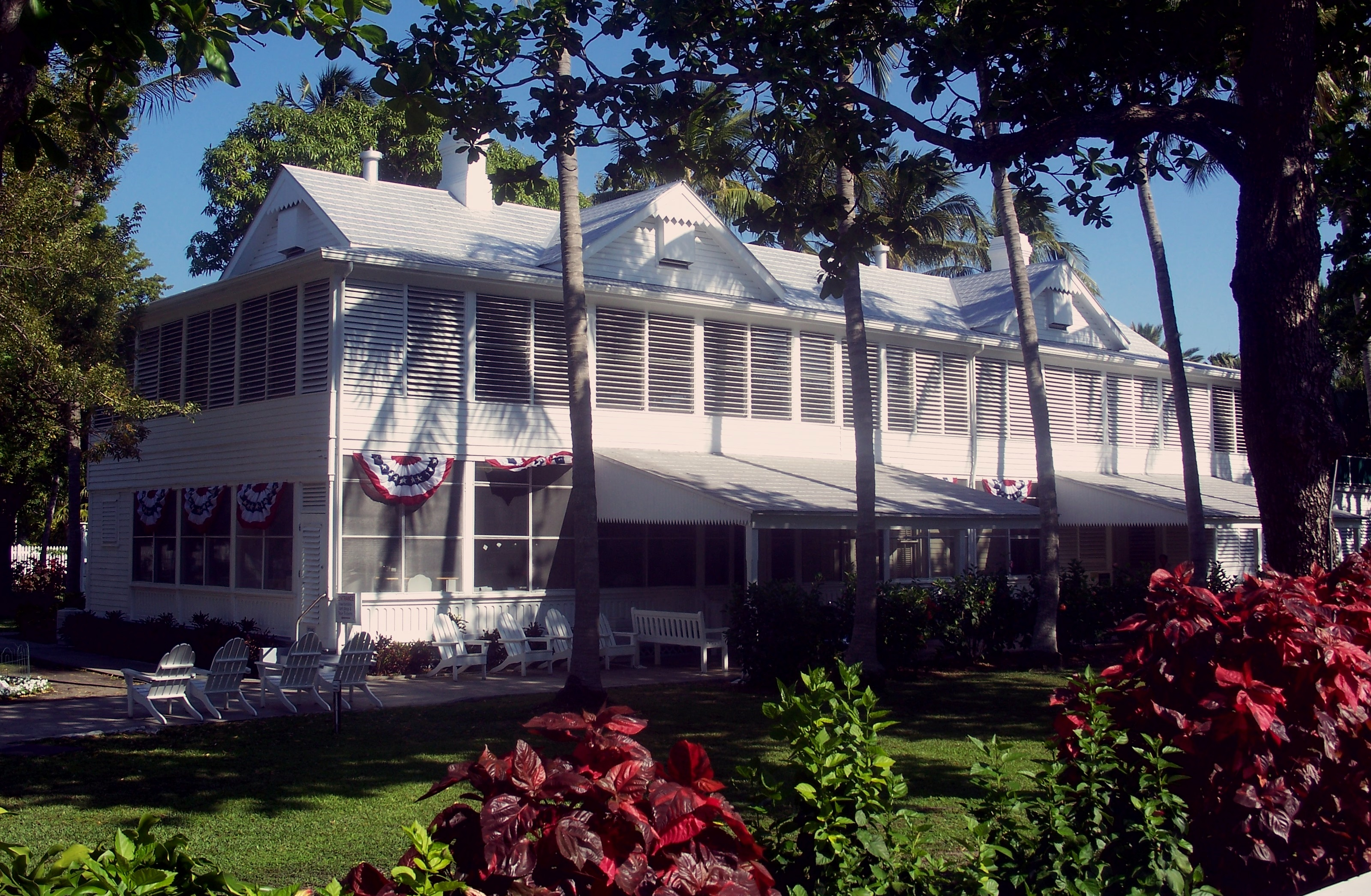
The Little White House in 2011

In January 2005, former president Bill Clinton and his wife, then Senator Hillary Clinton, spent a weekend in the Harry S. Truman Little White House. Former President Jimmy Carter and his family stayed in the Little White House for the second time in 2007. It was the last time a United States President stayed in the home since John F. Kennedy had visited Key West in March 1961, and in November 1962. Prior to Kennedy, Dwight D. Eisenhower stayed at the Little White House following a heart attack in 1955. Named after Truman for his total of 175 days on 11 visits to the home, the Little White House was opened as a state historic site & museum in 1991. The home's office quarters were first used by President William Howard Taft in 1912.

In 2001, an international summit was held by former Secretary of State, Colin Powell, in the Little White House. As of 2026, several items from President Truman's time in office remain on display on his desk in the museum, including his briefcase, books, telephone, and the "The Buck Stops Here" sign. Several landmarks in the Key West Historic District were added in the 21st century. Expanded in 1983 as a registered U.S. Historic district, the district includes the historic Sloppy Joe's Bar, added to the U.S. National Register of Historic Places in 2006. The Basilica of St. Mary Star of the Sea, added to the Register of Historic Place in 1971, was raised a minor basilica by Pope Benedict XVI on 11 February, 2012. The Western Union, berthed at the Key West Bight Historic Seaport, underwent restoration work in 2008 as part of the Secretary of the Interior's Standard for Historic Vessel Preservation Projects. In 2016, the Southernmost House historic mansion was inducted into the Historic Hotels of America program.

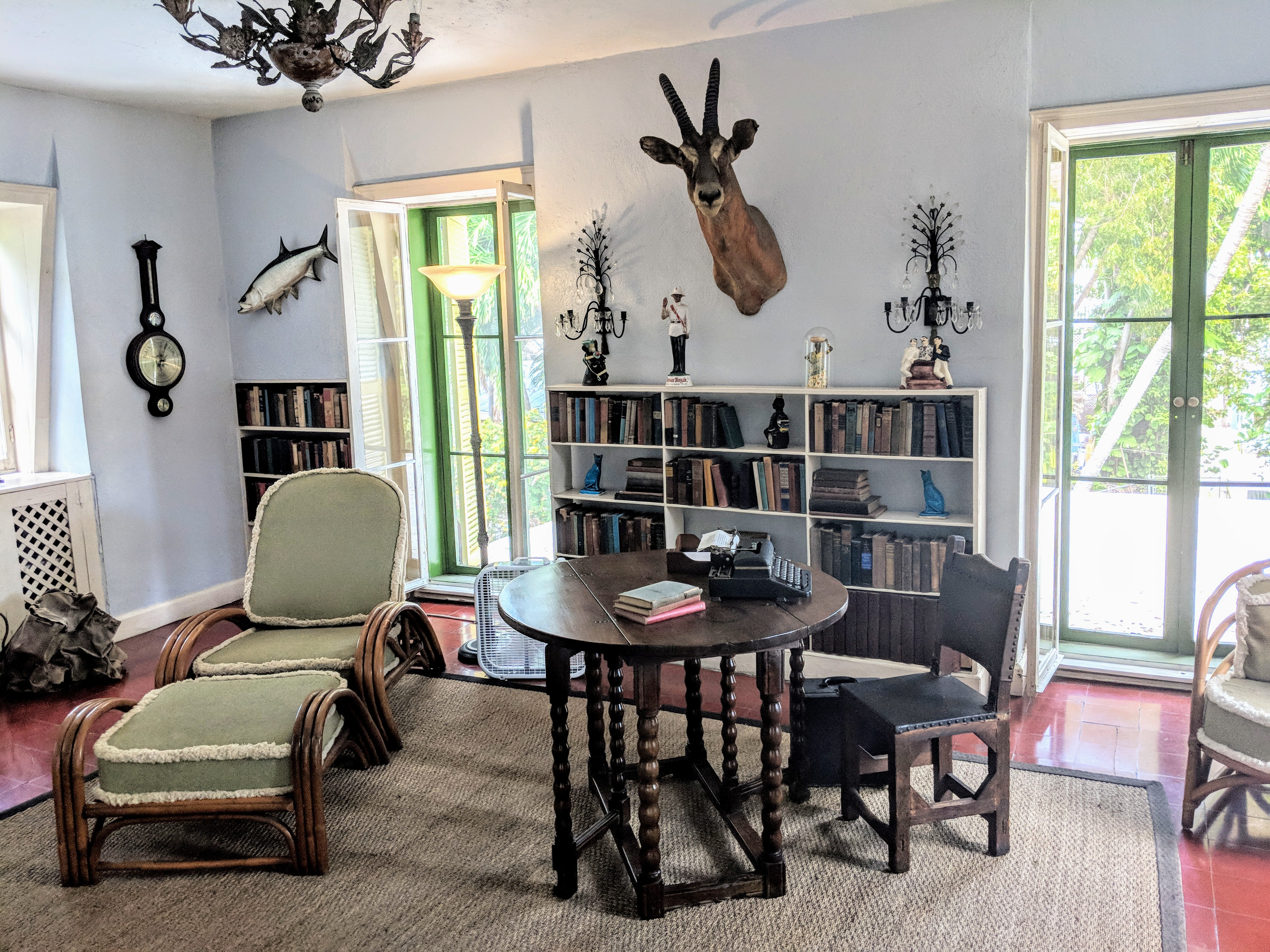
The "writing den" in the Hemingway House in present-day Key West, where author, Ernest Hemingway, wrote To Have and Have Not

On 24 October, 2005, Hurricane Wilma made landfall on Key West as a Category 3 tropical cyclone. The 12th hurricane of the 2005 cyclone season, Hurricane Wilma brought the highest storm surge observed in the Florida Keys since the 1965 Hurricane Betsy. The island's first surge occurred at 2:30 am and reached heights of 5–6 ft (1.5–1.8 m) above mean sea level (MSL). The runway complex at Key West International Airport was temporarily inundated by six inches of seawater on the Atlantic coast of the island and sustained the highest recorded wind speeds of a 2-minute average of 71 mph (114 km/h). Major roadways, including Flagler Avenue and the intersection at U.S. Highway 1 and Cross Street, were damaged with up to four feet of flooding at midnight. On the Gulf Coast, Key West's Old Town neighborhoods experienced heavy inundation. Key West sustained roughly $100 million in damages, with roughly sixty percent of the homes being flooded.

A vote was approved to add three amendments to the City Charter in 2020 that prohibited large cruise ships into the Port of Key West, sponsored Key West Committee for Safer, Cleaner Ships. The Port's cruise ship dock was originally opened in 1984 in Mallory Square and was met with disapproval by citizens that it would disrupt sunset watching on the square. In 2021, the Florida State Legislature overturned the amendments. In March 2024, Florida Governor Ron DeSantis approved renovation plans for Pier B, a project in which to service larger ships in the harbor.

== Historical industries ==
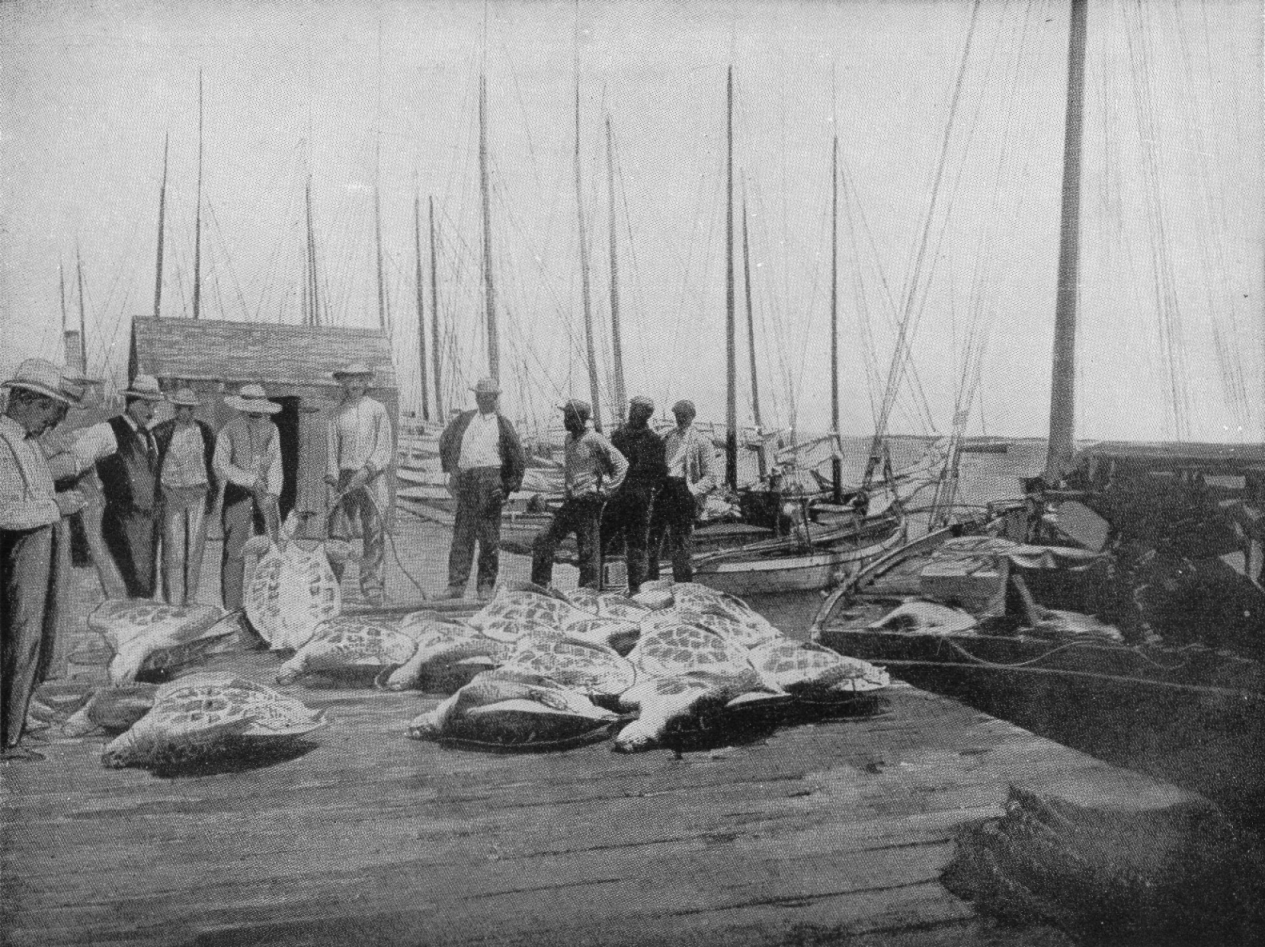
Fishermen surround captured sea turtles in Key West, c., 1900

The fishing industry was the center of Key West's economy throughout the island's history. Throughout much of the 19th and 20th centuries, Key West supplied eighty percent of all turtle products in the United States. Turtle fishing off of Key West first appeared in records of Ponce de Leon's voyage 68 miles off of the island to the Dry Tortugas in 1513, in which his crew reportedly caught 160 Green sea turtles to satisfy their supply of food rations. The presence of sea turtles soon contributed to the island's name Las Tortugas, Spanish for "the turtles". The turtles, extracted for meat, eggs, and soup, became a lucrative resource for early fishermen in Key West. Sea turtles in the island's waters were captured using small enclosures used as traps made from wooden or concrete pillars situated near Key West's harbors where they could be quickly processed in nearby canning buildings. Soup canning, made often from the green pigment of the turtle shells, were an extensive part of Key West's exports from 1912 until 1952, when the sea turtle population began to plummet throughout the Keys due to overfishing. In 1971, the Endangered Species Act was passed to allow the turtle population to recover, with the turtle and soup cannery buildings ceasing operations. On 23 June, 1994, Key West's historic turtle soup cannery buildings were added to the U.S. National Register of Historic Places.

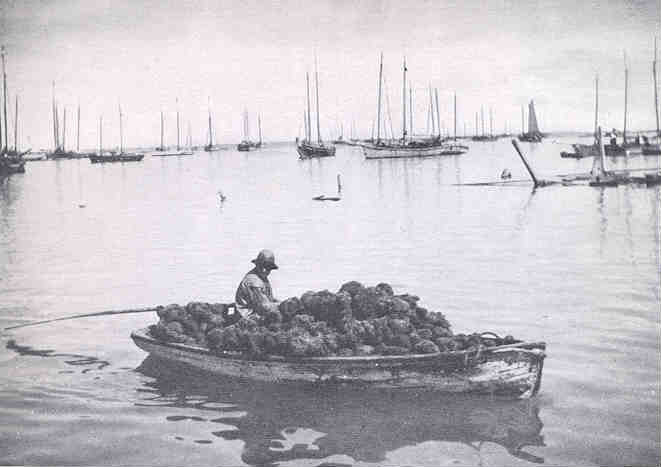
A sponger arrives at the Key West wharf in 1901

Key West's wrecking industry contributed the island's wealthiest periods throughout much of the 19th century. Shipwrecks became a common occurrence in the Florida Keys with vessels from the Old World running aground in the region's shallow reefs. Indigenous Natives in Key West were often employed by local industries to salvage cargo from wrecked merchant vessels during the early 17th century, including a major salvaging by natives of the Spanish Fleet wrecked off of the Marquesas Keys in 1622. Salvaging of the remains of the Nuestra Señora de Atocha, wrecked off of Key West on 6 September 1622, lasted for a duration of eight years by hired natives. On 4 July, 1823, Key West's wrecking act, developed by the legislative council of the Territory of Florida, contained 14 sections ruling that salvagers were required to bring wrecked property into the United States territory and "report it to the nearest justice of the peace".

As a result of the newly formed wrecking industry, the Pensacola Gazette reported in 1826 that gross duties paid on goods landed in Key West increased from $389 in 1823 to $14,108 in 1824. On 3 March, 1825, U.S. Congress passed the Federal Wrecking Act, mandating all property wrecked off of U.S. waters be brought in to the nearest U.S. port of entry. The following year, John Simonton reported that "from December, 1824, to December, 1825, $293,353.00 of wrecked property" was sold in Key West with the establishment of Superior Court in Key West of maritime and admiralty jurisdiction mandating that all Florida Keys wrecking property be taken to Key West.

In 1867, New York City-based cigar manufacturer, Samuel Sidenberg, established the first "clear Cuban" cigar factory in Key West. The island's devastating fire in 1886, destroying 18 cigar factories in Key West, left thousand employees without work and resulted in many factory owners relocating their operations to Ybor City in Tampa. The subsequent loss of cigar factories in Key West led to the eventual decline of the island's lucrative industry in the late 19th century. Key West significant sponging industry was also disrupted during the event. The Key West sponge industry originated with the discovery of large sponge beds in the shallow waters of Key West's reefs in the 19th century, enabling the production of roughly 2,000 tons of sponge products per year. At one point, Key West held a monopoly on the United States sponge trade and contributed to the first sponge shipment to New York City in 1849. Employing 1,200 men, sponging raised Key West's economy $750,000 annually by the mid-18th century.

== See also ==
- History of Florida
- Key West Historic District
- List of mayors of Key West, Florida
- List of largest cities of U.S. states and territories by historical population
