= William A. Whitehead =

American surveyor, historian, and public official

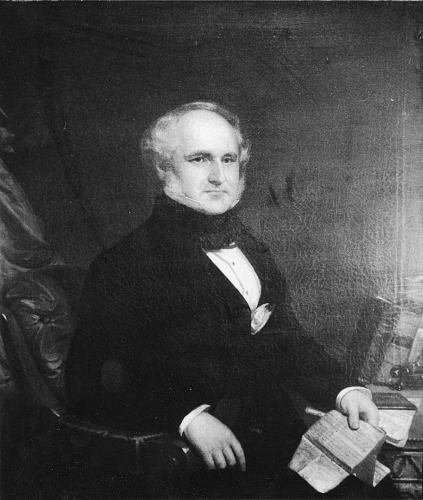
- Portrait of William A. Whitehead by Henry Peters Gray
- Born: February 19, 1810; Newark, New Jersey, U.S.
- Died: August 8, 1884 (aged 74); Perth Amboy, New Jersey, U.S.
- Occupations: Historian; surveyor; customs official
- Spouse: Elizabeth Parker
- Children: Cortlandt Whitehead

7th Mayor of Key West
- In office 1837–1838
- Preceded by: Fielding A. Browne
- Succeeded by: Tomaso Saccheti (Socarty)

William Adee Whitehead (February 19, 1810 – August 8, 1884) was an American historian, surveyor, customs official, and public servant. He is recognized for his contributions to the early history of New Jersey and Florida. He conducted one of the first surveys of Key West in 1829, and was subsequently served in several government positions there, including mayor from 1837 to 1838.

== Biography ==
=== Early life and lineage ===
William Adee Whitehead was born on February 19, 1810, in Newark, New Jersey. His father, William (12 May 1773 - 10 Jan 1837), served as cashier of the Newark Banking and Insurance Company, and his mother was Abby Coe, daughter of Benjamin and Bethia Coe. Whitehead's father was born in 1773 on St. Croix to an English family described as "not encumbered with worldly goods." He became fatherless at the age of eight and left home at twelve to seek his fortune in New York. Shortly after arriving, he apprenticed to a cabinet-maker from the Burling family, whose lead artisan, Thomas Burling, was known for supplying furniture to the homes of President George Washington and Secretary of State Thomas Jefferson.

Whitehead was born in a brick building that functioned as both the family residence and a banking office; the structure was later demolished, and the site became home to the New Jersey Historical Society, where Whitehead would spend much of his later years engaged in historical research and writing, serving as the Society's secretary until his death. Whitehead’s early education was limited. He attended several local primary schools and later enrolled at the Newark Academy. After less than two years, he completed his formal schooling.

Following his family's relocation to Perth Amboy, Whitehead was employed by the bank where his father served as cashier. He initially worked as a traveling circulator, transporting large sums of currency, and was later appointed as a bank messenger. During this period, he pursued self-education in French, elocution, and drawing, and began developing his interest in literary work.

=== Involvement in Key West ===
In the fall of 1828, after his elder brother John purchased a fourth interest in Key West, Whitehead traveled there with the intention of entering the mercantile business with him, but instead found employment as a surveyor. Whitehead wrote editorials for the Key West Enquirer, an early newspaper published in the Florida Keys. He retained copies of early local publications, including the Key West Gazette (1831–1832) and the Key West Enquirer (1834–1836). In 1869, he returned the bound volumes to the Monroe County Clerk of Courts Office. Within the papers, Whitehead offered the following advice:

I hope my former suggestions have been carried out in relation to the preservation of files of your newspapers in some one of the public offices. We are too apt to underrate the importance of the events of today, forgetful that their results constitute the history of tomorrow. Without the preservation of papers, your changing population will soon be at loss for the connecting links between Key West of the present and the Key West of the future.

During his tenure in Key West as a surveyor, Whitehead was appointed "Collector of the Port", a post he held from 1830 until 1838. In 1831, he was appointed by the Territorial Council to erect a stone jail. In addition to this role, Whitehead served on the town council and, in 1837, was elected mayor. He played a prominent role in civic development, contributing to the founding of a local newspaper and the promotion of education. He helped in establishing the first Episcopal congregation in Key West, and in recognition of his public service, both a point of land and a street were named in his honor.

Whitehead's term as mayor on the island came to an end when the Key West city charter of 1836 specified that an occupational tax be levied. However, several of the town's leaders opposed this revenue measure and refused to pay the tax. Whitehead, feeling duty-bound to uphold the charter, requested that the city council call a town meeting "to determine whether the laws shall be enforced or the charter dissolved." When the council refused, Whitehead called a snap election and declared that the winner could succeed him.

=== Financial career ===
In 1838, Whitehead relocated to New York City, where he entered the stock brokerage business and spent nearly five years in that business. During this period, he gained access to the collections of the New York Historical Society and began developing his lifelong interest in New Jersey history. He authored a series of historical essays titled Glimpses of the Past for the Newark Daily Advertiser. After 1848, Whitehead entered the service of the Astor Insurance Company. For three years he held several administrative positions in the transportation and finance sectors, serving as secretary of the New Jersey Railroad and Transportation Company and later as treasurer of the New York and Harlem Railroad. He then returned to the New Jersey Railroad, where he remained until 1871. From 1871 to 1879, he was affiliated with the American Trust Company of New Jersey. Though he continued to conduct business in New York for some years, after 1813 his residence was in Newark.

== Personal life ==
Whitehead married Margaret Elizabeth Parker, daughter of James Parker of Perth Amboy, on August 11, 1834. The couple had three children: two sons, and a daughter. His youngest son, Cortlandt Whitehead, was the Episcopal Bishop of Pittsburgh from 1882 to 1922.

He died in Perth Amboy, New Jersey, on August 8, 1884.

== Selected works ==
- East Jersey under the Proprietary Governments (1846) LCCN 01-14493
- Papers of Lewis Morris, Governor of New Jersey, with memoir and notes (Newark: New Jersey Historical Society, 1852)
- Contributions to the Early History of Perth Amboy and Adjoining Country (1856) ISBN 978-0-7222-0276-0
- An Analytical Index to the Colonial Documents of New Jersey (Newark: New Jersey Historical Society, 1858) ISBN 978-0-530-90347-7
- Proceedings commemorative of the settlement of Newark, New Jersey (Newark: New Jersey Historical Society, 1866)
- Documents relating to the colonial history of the state of New Jersey, [1631-1776] (1880) LCCN 02-27145
