= Cortlandt Whitehead =

American bishop

The Right Reverend Cortlandt Whitehead D.D., LL.D.
- Bishop of Pittsburgh
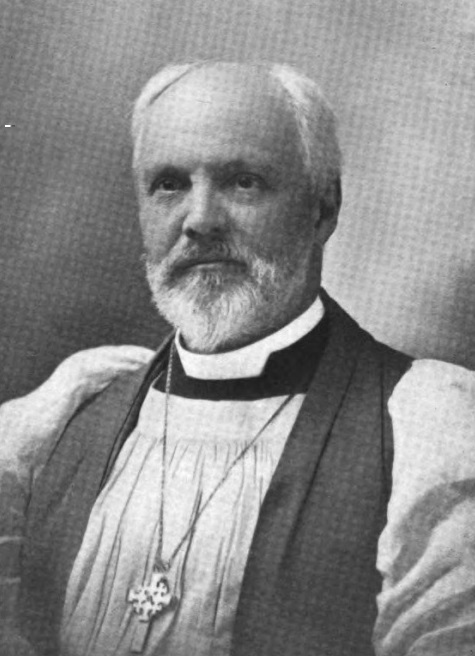
- Church: Episcopal Church
- Diocese: Pittsburgh
- Elected: October 20, 1881
- In office: 1882–1922
- Predecessor: John Barrett Kerfoot
- Successor: Alexander Mann

Orders
- Ordination: August 8, 1868 by George M. Randall
- Consecration: January 25, 1882 by William Bacon Stevens

Personal details
- Born: October 30, 1842 New York City, New York, United States
- Died: September 18, 1922 (aged 79) Niagara Falls, New York, United States
- Buried: Allegheny Cemetery
- Denomination: Anglican
- Parents: William Adee Whitehead & Margaret Elizabeth Parker
- Spouse: Charlotte Burgoyne King (m. 1868)
- Children: 5

Cortlandt Whitehead (October 30, 1842 – September 18, 1922) was bishop of the Episcopal Diocese of Pittsburgh from 1882 to 1922.

== Biography ==
Cortlandt Whitehead's father was William Adee Whitehead (1810–1884), the son of William Whitehead, who was born of English parents in the Island of St. Croix, W.I., May 12, 1773. His wife was Abby Coe, of Newark, N.J. Whitehead's mother was Margaret Elizabeth Parker, the daughter of James and Penelope (Butler) Parker, of Perth Amboy, N.J. Whitehead's grandfather, James Parker, was the grandson of Rev. William Skinner, first rector of St. Peter's Church, Perth Amboy. The latter was a member of the Clan MacGregor, and assumed the name of Skinner, when, after the rebellion of 1715, the name MacGregor was proscribed. His wife was Elizabeth Van Courtlandt, daughter of Stephanus Van Cortlandt, first lord of the Manor of Courtlandt, Westchester County, N. Y.

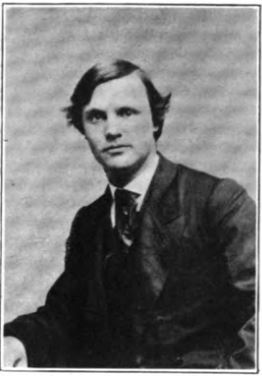
Cortlandt Whitehead, as a young man

Cortlandt Whitehead was born in New York City on October 30, 1842. All his early years were spent in Newark, New Jersey, where at various schools, and later at the Newark Academy, he made preparation for college, and then to Phillips Academy, Andover, Mass., graduating in the Class of 1859. In the autumn of that year, he joined the Class of 1863 of Yale College, graduating in due course, and taking the degree of Master of Arts three years later, in 1866. Thereafter, for four years, he was in preparation for the ministry, one of those years, however, spent as a private tutor. In 1867 he graduated at the Philadelphia Divinity School, and was admitted deacon by the Right Reverend William Henry Odenheimer, D.D., Bishop of New Jersey, in Trinity Church, Newark, on June 21.

Immediately upon admission to the ministry, he offered himself to the Right Reverend George H. Randall, D.D., Bishop of Colorado, to serve as missionary in his jurisdiction; and during August, 1867, he journeyed across the plains, a considerable portion of the journey being by stagecoach, to Denver, and thence to Black Hawk and Central City, in the mountains west of Denver. In these places, and at Georgetown and Idaho City, he held service and did missionary work for three years.

He was married on July 29, 1868, to Charlotte Burgoyne King, of Roxborough, Mass. Her parents' names were John Cruikshank King and Mary Luke, of Scotch and English ancestry. His wife was born on December 27, 1842. he was advanced to the priesthood in St. Mark's Chapel, Black Hawk, Colo., August 8, 1868, by the Right Reverend George M. Randall, D.D., Bishop of Colorado.

In 1870 he was called to the rectorship of the Church of the Nativity, South Bethlehem, Pennsylvania, and there remained eleven years, until he became Bishop of Pittsburgh in 1882. During that time he held several offices in the Diocese of Central Pennsylvania, and was Assistant Secretary of the convention for ten years. He received the degree of Doctor of Divinity from Union College in 1880.

On January 25, 1882, at Trinity Church, Pittsburgh, he was consecrated Bishop of Pittsburgh, by the Right Reverend William Bacon Stevens, D.D., Bishop of Pennsylvania, assisted by the bishops of Ohio, Central Pennsylvania, New Jersey, West Virginia, and Huron, Canada. In 1887 he received the degree of Doctor of Divinity from Hobart College, and in 1890, the degree of Doctor of Sacred Theology from St. Stephen's College, Annandale.

As bishop he presided over a diocese of twenty-four counties in Western Pennsylvania. He was president, ex-officio, of various boards and societies, a member of the board of managers of the Missionary Society of the Episcopal Church, Trustee of the General Theological Seminary, and trustee of the Western University of Pennsylvania, situated at Pittsburgh.

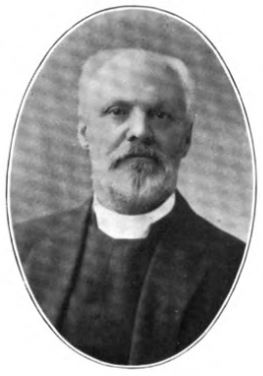
Cortlandt Whitehead

He had five children:

- John Brinton Whitehead, married Martha Douglas Sharpe, of Philadelphia, May 28, 1903. John Brinton Whitehead's daughter, Aliph Van Cortlandt Whitehead, married Floyd Crosby, Academy Award-winning American cinematographer
- Edith Wallace Whitehead, married October 20, 1903, to Mr. Presley Neville Guthrie, Jr., of Elmira, N. Y.

Three daughters were unmarried: Mary, Margaret van Courtlandt, Penelope Parker.

His recreations were home pleasures, travel, sailing, and occasional outdoor sports.

He attended two Lambeth Conferences in England, 1888 and 1897, and crossed the Atlantic for travel in England and on the Continent six times. He also visited California, and on another occasion, via the Canadian Pacific, made the trip to Alaska, and returned by way of Oregon and Yellowstone Park.

Cortlandt Whitehead died in Niagara Falls, New York on September 18, 1922, and was buried at Allegheny Cemetery.
