= USS Marblehead =

Three ships of the United States Navy have been named USS Marblehead after the port of Marblehead, Massachusetts.

- USS Marblehead (1861), launched in 1861, was a gunboat that served in the American Civil War and was sold in 1868.
- USS Marblehead (C-11), launched in 1892, was a Montgomery-class cruiser. She served in the Spanish–American War and was sold in 1921.
- USS Marblehead (CL-12), launched in 1923, was an Omaha-class light cruiser. She served in World War II until scrapped in 1947.
