= West Martello Tower =

- U.S. National Register of Historic Places
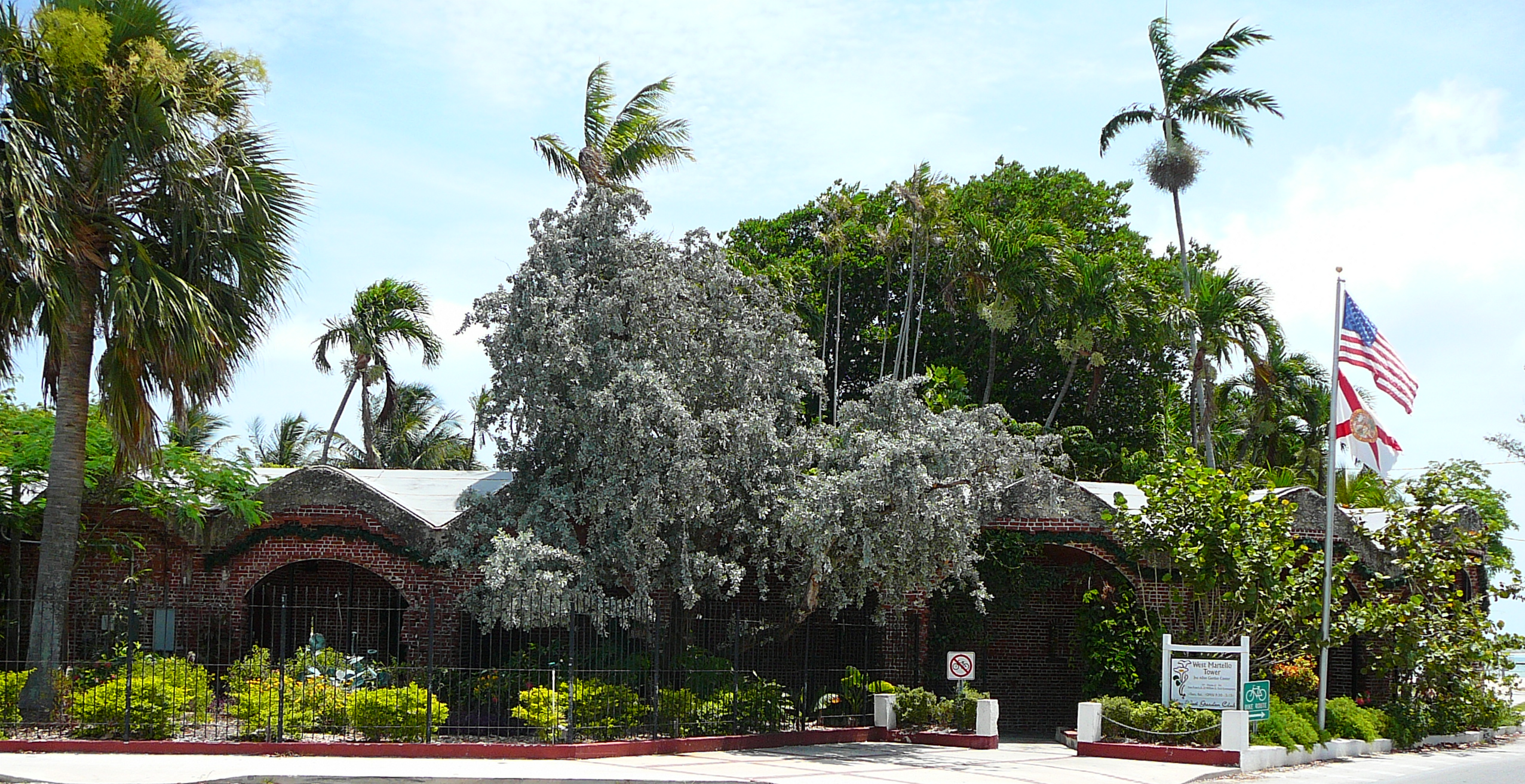
- West Martello Tower in Key West, Florida

- Location within Florida Location within the United States
- Location: Key West, Florida
- Coordinates: 24°32′49″N 81°47′10″W
- Built: 1862
- NRHP reference No.: 76000602
- Added to NRHP: June 24, 1976

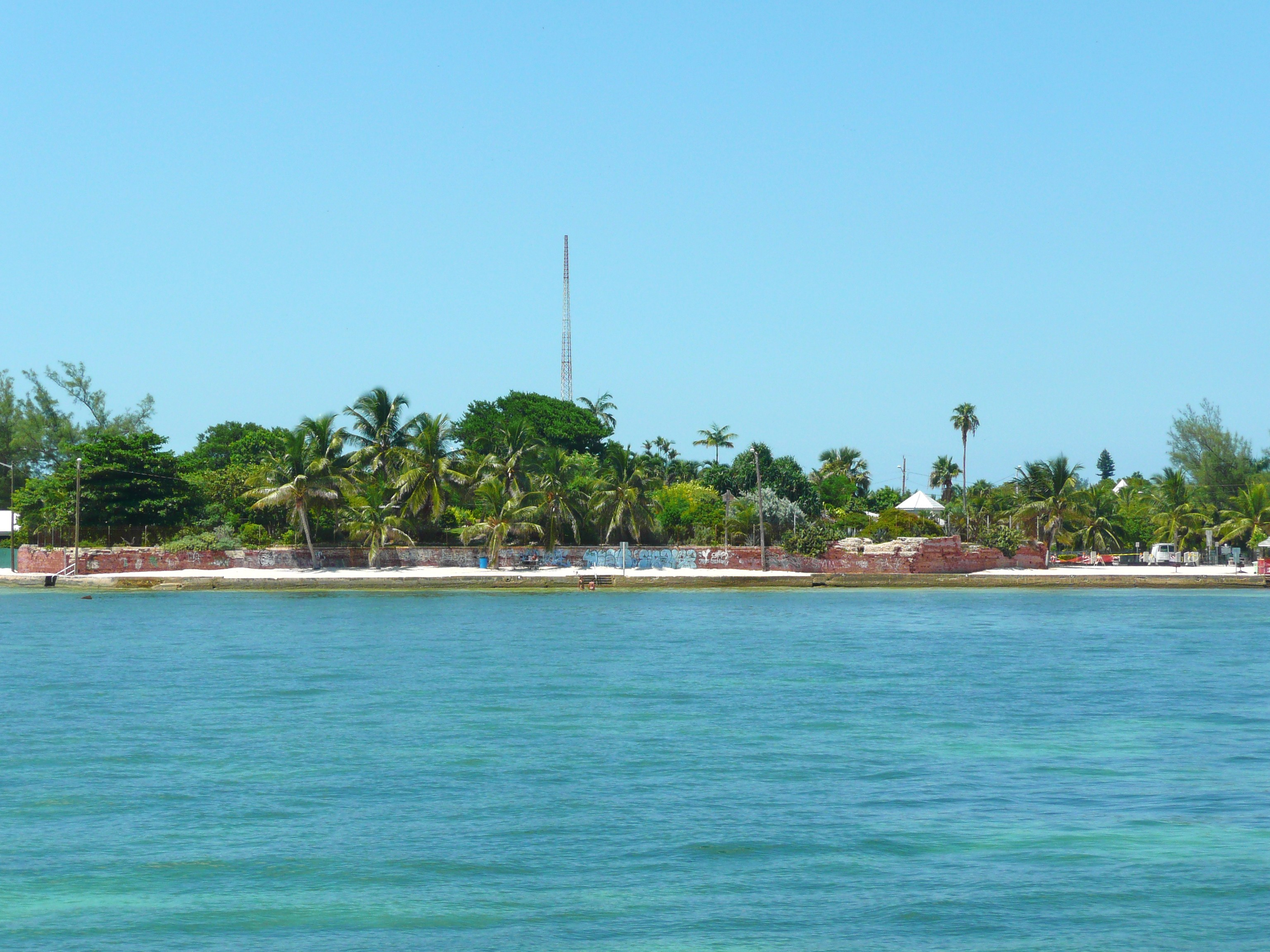
West Martello Fort as seen from the Atlantic Ocean

The West Martello Tower (also known as the Key West Garden Club) is a historic martello tower in Key West, Florida, United States. It is located at 1100 Atlantic Boulevard. On June 24, 1976, it was added to the U.S. National Register of Historic Places.

West Martello Tower was completed, during the American Civil War. It saw no battle action, though was used as a target.

== References and external links ==
- Monroe County listings at National Register of Historic Places
- Florida's Office of Cultural and Historical Programs
- Historical reference
  - Monroe County listings
  - West Martello Tower and Garden Center
