= Port of Key West =

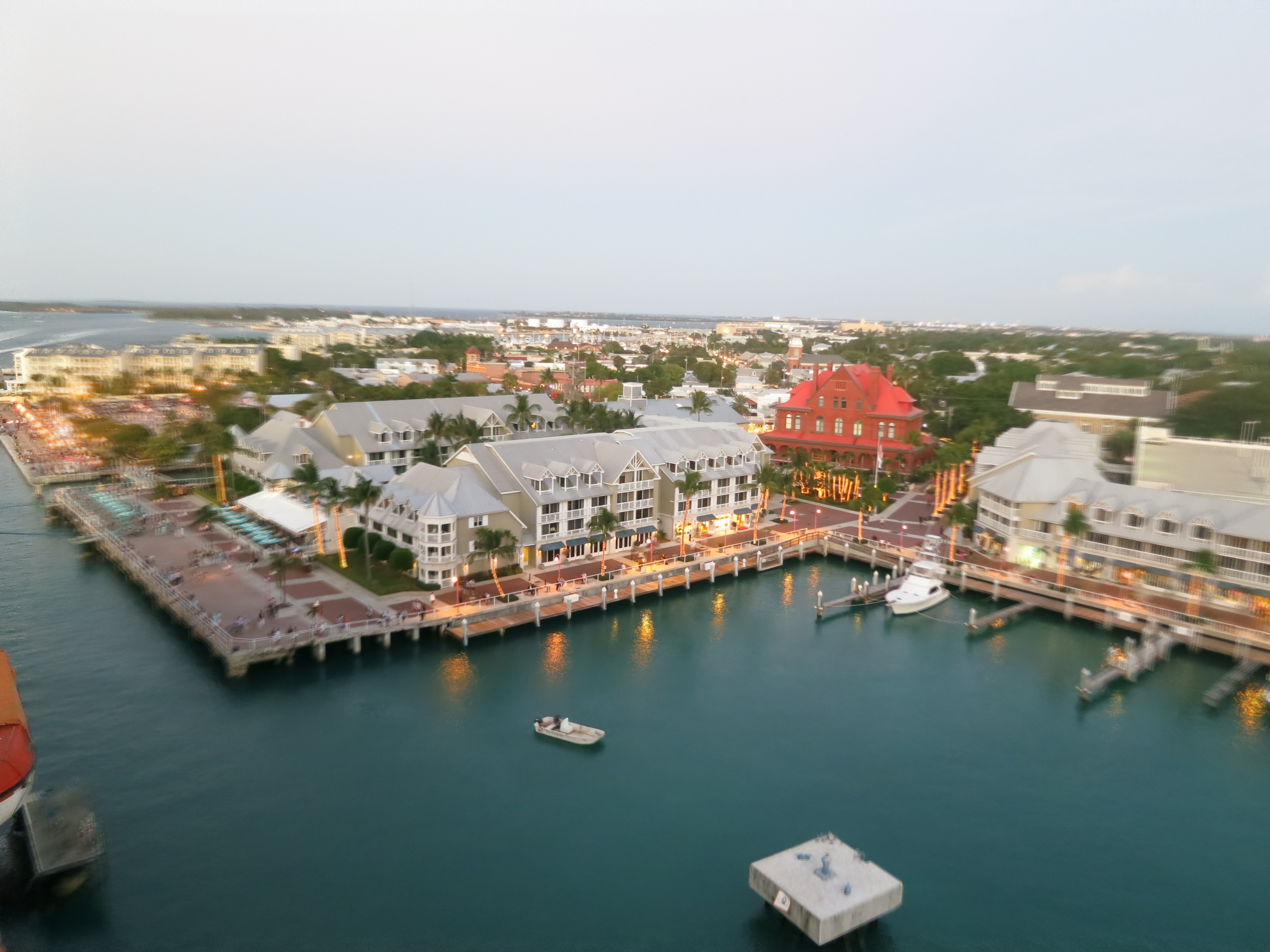
- The pier at the port
- Interactive map of Port of Key West
- Location within the United States

Location
- Country: United States
- Location: Key West, Florida
- Coordinates: 24°33′55″N 81°46′33″W
- UN/LOCODE: USEYW

Details
- Owned by: City of Key West
- No. of berths: 3
- Draft depth: 34 ft.

Statistics
- Website; *Official website

The Port of Key West is a port in Key West, Florida. It includes Key West Bight, Garrison Bight at City Marina, as well as three docks that could be utilized by cruise ships.

== History ==
The first cruise ship to adopt the port was the Sunward in 1969. It docked at Pier B, which was owned at that time by the U.S. Navy.

In 1984, the city opened a cruise dock at Mallory Square. The decision was met with opponents who claimed that it would disrupt the tradition of watching the sunset at Mallory Square.

In 2013, a referendum to widen the ship channel was defeated by 73% of voters. The proposal, backed by the Key West Chamber of Commerce, was intended to accommodate larger cruise ships and would have required dredging 17 acres of sea bottom, which includes endangered corals, in the protected Florida Keys National Marine Sanctuary.

In 2020, Key West voters approved three amendments to the City Charter which prohibit large cruise ships, limit daily disembarkations, and prioritize cruise ships with superior public health and environmental records. The amendments, sponsored by the Key West Committee for Safer, Cleaner Ships, passed with 61% to 81% approval. However, the following year, the state legislature overturned the amendments. In 2022, the city decided to instead prohibit ships from docking at the two piers the city controls. Meanwhile, Pier B is planned to undergo an expansion renovation to service bigger ships, which would first have to be approved by the state. In March 2024, Florida Governor Ron DeSantis approved the renovation for Pier B, which would expand the lease area by about 50 feet in width and about 40 feet in length. In addition, approval was given for a new long-term lease of 25 years.

On May 5, 2026, the U.S. Navy issued a notice terminating the City of Key West’s lease for the use of the Outer Mole Pier. The following day, the U.S. Navy issued a Request for Interest (RFI) to determine "the potential use of underutilized space on the Outer Mole Pier." The lease officially terminated on August 3, 2026. Meanwhile, the City Commission reaffirmed its position favoring limited cruise ship visits, voting 5–2 to uphold its policy. However, the resolution does not affect federal jurisdiction over the Outer Mole Pier.

== Services ==
Cruise ships can be serviced by three separate docking facilities. Mallory Square Dock is owned and operated by the City of Key West; the Outer Mole Pier is federally owned; and Pier B is operated by Pier B Development Corporation through a lease agreement with the State of Florida. The city's restrictions on cruise ships apply to ports that fall within the city's authority. As of 2024, Mallory Square Dock is primarily used by American Cruise Lines, a small-ship cruise line, while Pier B is currently being used for all cruise ships.

A domestic ferry port operates near the Bight of Key West. The port is among the busiest passenger ports in the United States and one of Florida's most important and oldest ferry ports. The port conducts passenger ferry and cruise service to and from Miami, Tampa, Jacksonville, Fort Myers, Port Everglades, Cape Canaveral, and Marco Island, Florida. This allows passengers to travel to Key West without using the busy U.S. 1 Overseas Highway Corridor.

== Impacts ==
=== Environmental ===
A United States Environmental Protection Agency (EPA) investigation issued a Finding of No Significant Impact. A proposed plan to dredge the channel was criticized because it would require dredging in the canal and in the surrounding area with possible silting and related damage to sea life, which could affect Key West's seafood industry.

=== Economy ===
The cruise ship industry delivers people to the city, where they contribute to the economy by spending at local businesses. This adds about $85 million to business revenues. The port contributes 1,260 jobs. These figures are a significant fraction of the city's economy.
