= UPF World Summit =

The World Summit is a UPF project that aims to bring together the heads of state, who with their vast experience and wisdom can help build a world of mutual understanding, sustainable peace and prosperity for all.

Parliamentarians, religious leaders, representatives of civil society and women leaders also participate in the World Summit.

During the world summit, various sessions are held that present the work of various UPF associations for peace in the world, such as:

- International Summit Council for Peace
- International Association of First Ladies for Peace
- International Association of Parliamentarians for Peace
- Interreligious Association for Peace and Development
- International Association for Peace and Economic Development
- International Media Association for Peace
- International Association of Academicians for Peace
- International Association of Arts and Culture for Peace

== International Peace Summit in Sao Tome and Principe 2019 ==
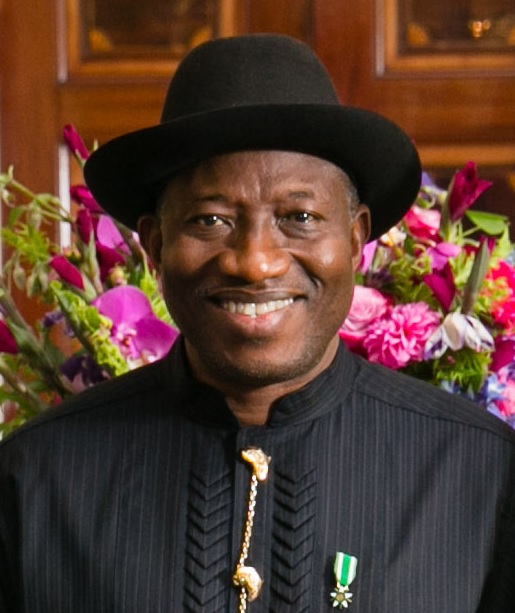
Goodluck Jonathan, chairman of the International Peace Council, Africa.

Former Nigerian President Goodluck Jonathan delivered the opening speech at the 2019 International Peace Summit in Sao Tome and Principe. The conference was attended by several current and former African leaders, such as the president and prime minister of Sao Tome, the former president of Niger and the former president of Guinea-Bissau.

The theme of the conference was: "Building a Peaceful and Prosperous Africa Centered on Universal Values: Interdependence, Mutual Prosperity and Universal Values".

Former Nigerian President Goodluck Jonathan attended the conference as chairman of the newly launched International Peace Council, Africa.

== 2020 World Summit ==
Peace, security and human development were discussed at the 2020 World Summit in South Korea. The Summit was attended by the Prime Minister of Cambodia Hun Sen, former UN Secretary General Ban Ki Moon, former President of Nigeria Goodluck Jonathan, Newt Gingrich, former President of the US Congress and many other world leaders.

During the 2020 World Summit General Assembly, former UN secretary general Ban Ki Moon received the Sunhak Peace Prize.

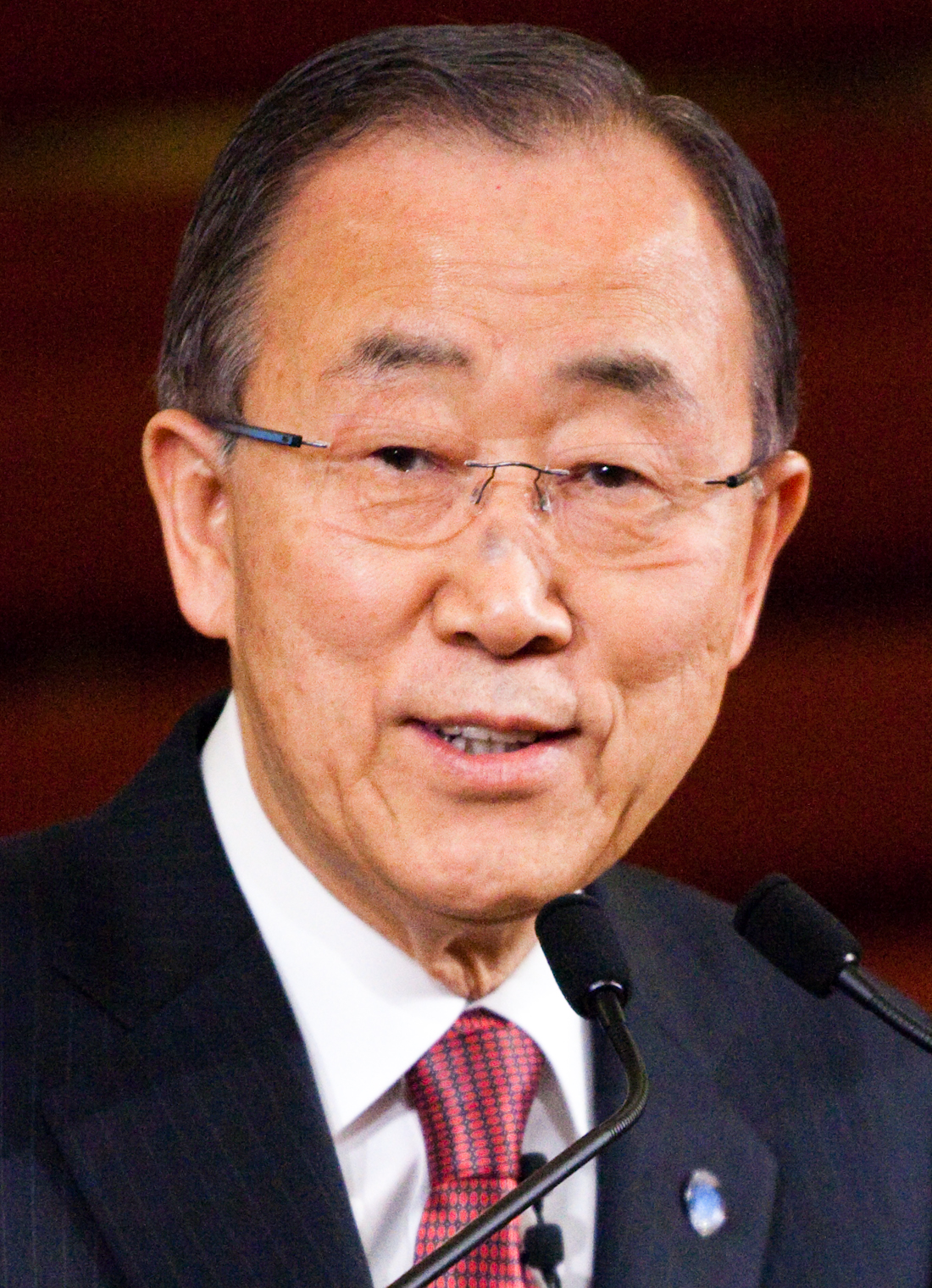
Former UN Secretary General Ban Ki Moon, winner of the Sunhak Peace Prize

The summit meeting of the International Peace Council, which was attended by many former and current presidents of states, was chaired by former Nigerian president Goodluck Jonathan.

== 2022 Asia- Pacific Forums ==
During 2022, the UPF held a series of global forums to discuss the establishment of peace on the Korean Peninsula.

Global forums were held on all continents, with the aim of finding strategies for peace on the Korean peninsula, within the scope of the Think Tank 2022 project, which brings together numerous experts.

The forums are organized by seven different UPF associations and are part of the 2022 World Summit.

== World Summit 2022 ==
The UPF and the Royal Government of Cambodia have convened the World Summit for Peace on the Korean Peninsula 2022 in South Korea.

Many world political and religious leaders from more than 150 countries participated in the World Summit and discussed how to achieve peace on the Korean Peninsula.

Former US President Trump, Sall, President of Senegal, former US Secretary of State Pompeo, former US Congress President Gingrich, former European Commission President Barroso, former US Vice President Pence, and numerous other world leaders took part in the summit, live or via video.

During the 2022 World Summit General Assembly, Hun Sen, Prime Minister of Cambodia, received the Sunhak Peace Prize.

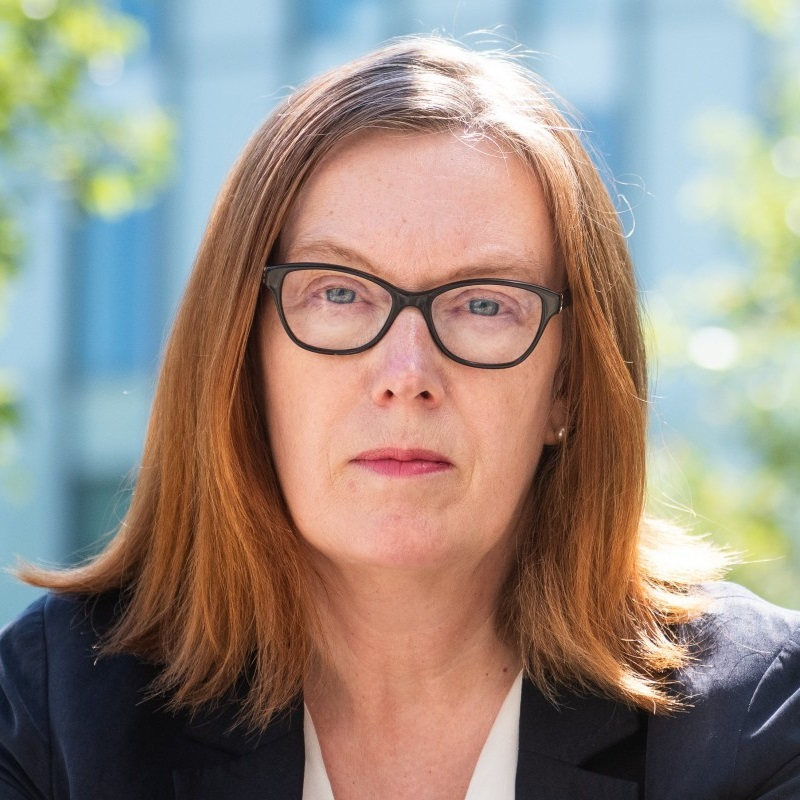
Dr. Sarah Gilbert, winner of the Sunhak Peace Prize

The Sunhak Peace Prize was also awarded to prof. Sarah Gilbert and Gavi from the University of Oxford for their contribution to ending the COVID-19 pandemic.

During the Summit for Peace, numerous meetings were held such as the THINK TANK Forum 2022, the International Summit of the Peace Council, the International Association of Parliamentarians for Peace, the International Media Association for Peace, the World Association of Entrepreneurs for Peace and the Seonhak Peace Award Ceremony.

== Summit 2022 and Leadership Conference ==
UPF organized an international summit for peace in August 2022 in South Korea. The summit was attended by several world leaders such as former Canadian Prime Minister Harper, former President of the US Congress Gingrich, former US Secretary of State Pompeo, former US Vice President Pence, former European Commission President Barroso and others.

The participants of the summit gave their support to building peace in the world, especially on the Korean Peninsula. Religious freedom was also discussed at the Summit and support was given to the education of young people in Africa.

During the summit, participants were invited to sign three pledges: the Resolution for the Universal Charter of Peace, the Resolution on the Establishment of the African Consultative Council in partnership with the African Union, and the Declaration on the Universal Value of Religious Freedom.

A Memorandum of Understanding was also signed between the Universal Peace Federation, the Community of Sahelian and Saharan States, the International Association of Youth and Students for Peace and the Sunhak Foundation with the aim of supporting the education of African youth.
