= Fielding A. Browne =

American politician

Fielding Archer Browne (c. 1796 – March 2, 1852) was an American politician and diplomat who served as the fourth mayor of Key West, Florida, 1833–34. During his term as mayor, many Bahamians immigrated to Key West.

He was originally from Virginia, and served in the 9th Regiment (Sharp's) Virginia Militia during the War of 1812. His brother had immigrated to Mexico and Browne followed, only to be shipwrecked in Key West on Christmas Eve 1830. He chose to stay and became one of the earliest American settlers on the island. He served as vice consul for France and Spain. He married Angelina Sophia Folker on September 26, 1837, in Key West.
