= List of mayors of Key West, Florida =

Mayors of Key West, Florida in the United States have reflected the city's cultural and ethnic heritage including Cuban and openly gay mayors.

1. 1822–1828 — John H. Fleming, Mayor (head of chamber of commerce as well)
2. 1828–1828 — Edgar Macon, Mayor
  - A. 1828–1830 — Edgar Macon, President of the Town Council
  - B. 1831–1832 — D. C. Pinkham, President of the Town Council
3. 1832–1833 — Oliver O'Hara, Mayor
4. 1833–1834 — Fielding A. Browne
5. 1834–1835 — Adam Gordon
6. 1835–1837 — Fielding A. Browne (2nd Term)
7. 1837–1838 — William A. Whitehead
8. 1838–1839 — Tomaso Saccheti (Socarty)
9. 1839–1840 — Pardon C. Greene
10. 1840–1841 — Philip J. Fontaine
11. 1841–1842 — Alexander Patterson
12. 1842–1844 — Philip J. Fontaine (2nd Term)
13. 1844–1846 — Benjamin Sawyer
14. 1846–1848 — Walter C. Maloney
15. 1848–1852 — Alexander Patterson (2nd Term)
16. 1852–1853 — Fernando J. Moreno
17. 1853–1854 — John W. Porter
18. 1854–1854 — John W. Porter (2nd Term)
19. 1854–1855 — William Curry
20. 1855–1856 — Philip J. Fontaine (3rd Term)
21. 1856–1857 — Alexander Patterson (3rd Term)
22. 1857–1861 — John P. Baldwin
23. 1861–1861 — William Marvin
24. 1861–1864 — Alexander Patterson (4th Term)
25. 1864–1865 — E. O. Gwynn
26. 1865–1866 — Alexander Patterson (5th Term)
27. 1866–1866 — William Marvin (2nd Term)
28. 1866–1867 — E. O. Gwynn (2nd Term)
29. 1867–1868 — Alexander Patterson (6th Term)
30. 1868–1868 — Henry Mulrennan
31. 1868–1868 — W. S. Allen
32. 1868–1869 — Dr. D. W. Whitehurst
33. 1869–1870 — uncertain
34. 1870–1870 — Henry Mulrennan (2nd Term)
35. 1870–1871 — Joseph B. Browne
36. 1871–1872 — William D. Cash
37. 1872–1873 — Winer Bethel
38. 1873–1874 — W. S. Allen (2nd Term)
39. 1874–1875 — E. O. Gwynn (3rd Term)
40. 1875–1876 — Carlos M. de Cespedes
41. 1876–1880 — Livingston W. Bethel
42. 1880–1881 — Robert Jasper Perry
43. 1881–1882 — E. O. Gwynn (4th Term)
44. 1882–1883 — William McClintock
45. 1883–1885 — R. Alfred Monsalvatage
46. 1885–1886 — James G. Jones
47. 1886–1888 — J. W. V. R. Plummer
48. 1888–1889 — James A. Waddell
49. 1889–1891 — Walter C. Maloney, Jr.
50. 1891–1895 — Robert Jasper Perry (2nd Term)
51. 1895–1897 — James A. Waddell (2nd Term)
52. 1897–1898 — John B. Maloney
53. 1898–1903 — George L. Bartlum
54. 1903–1905 — Benjamin D. Trevor
55. 1905–1907 — George L. Babcock
56. 1907–1915 — Dr. Joseph N. Fogarty
57. 1915–1917 — Norberg Thompson
58. 1917–1919 — Allan B. Cleare
59. 1919–1921 — Louis E. Otto
60. 1921–1925 — Frank H. Ladd
61. 1925–1933 — Leslie A. Curry
62. 1933–1935 — William H. Malone
63. 1935–1937 — Henry C. Galey
64. 1937–1945 — Willard Albury
65. 1945–1945 — William W. Demeritt
66. 1945–1945 — John Carbonell
67. 1945–1947 — William W. Demeritt (2nd Term)
68. 1947–1949 — A. Maitland Adams
69. 1949–1950 — Louis M. J. Eisner
70. 1950–1951 — John Carbonell (2nd Term)
71. 1951–1951 — Louis M. J. Eisner (2nd Term)
72. 1951–1957 — C. B. Harvey
73. 1957–1961 — Delio Cobo
74. 1961–1963 — C. B. Harvey (2nd Term)
75. 1963–1969 — Kermit Lewin
76. 1969–1971 — Delio Cobo (2nd Term)
77. 1971–1981 — Charles "Sonny" McCoy
78. 1981–1983 — Dennis Wardlow
79. 1983–1985 — Richard A. Heyman
80. 1985–1987 — Tom Sawyer
81. 1987–1989 — Richard A. Heyman (2nd Term)
82. 1989–1989 — John Ingahm
83. 1989–1991 — Tony Tarracino
84. 1991–1995 — Dennis Wardlow (2nd Term)
85. 1995–1995 — Tom Sawyer
86. 1995–1997 — Dennis Wardlow (3rd Term)
87. 1997–1999 — Sheila Mullins
88. 1999–2005 — Jimmy Weekley
89. 2005–2009 — Morgan McPherson
90. 2009–2018 — Craig Cates
91. 2018–2024 — Teri Johnston
92. 2024–Present — Danise "Dee Dee" Henriquez
