= Tony Tarracino =

American politician

Mayor of Key West
- In office 1989–1991
- Preceded by: John Ingahm
- Succeeded by: Dennis Wardlow

Personal details
- Born: Anthony Tarracino; August 10, 1916; Elizabeth, New Jersey
- Died: November 1, 2008

Tony Tarracino (August 10, 1916 – November 1, 2008), commonly called Captain Tony, was an American saloonkeeper, boat captain, politician, gambler, and storyteller in Key West, Florida. He was a well-known personality in the city and has been called "arguably the city's most beloved resident" and "the conscience of Key West."

== Biography ==
Anthony Tarracino was born in Elizabeth, New Jersey to a bootlegger father. He dropped out of the ninth grade to make and sell whiskey, illegal at the time due to Prohibition. After becoming a gambler, getting involved with the New Jersey Mafia, and being beaten and left for dead at the Newark city dump, he moved to Key West, Florida, in 1948. In 1982, he told the story that he, in Sting fashion, had cheated the mob by using the telephone to get early race results.

There he became a shrimper, a charter boat captain, and a gunrunner. From 1961, Tarracino was the proprietor of Captain Tony's Saloon at 428 Greene Street in Key West, the original location of Sloppy Joe's bar frequented by Ernest Hemingway in the 1930s (the current Sloppy Joe's is located a few doors away at 201 Duval Street). He sold the bar in 1989 but remained a fixture there until shortly before his death. The bar still retains his name.

Tarracino was politically active in Key West politics running for mayor four times before winning office in 1989 by only 32 votes out of more than 6,000 cast. He sought to "limit Key West's growth and to keep its reputation as a refuge for eccentrics and renegades who had found their way to the southernmost point of the continental United States." As mayor, he preserved Key West's daily sunset celebration but he lost a bid for re-election in 1991 to Dennis Wardlow, "prime minister" of the tongue-in-cheek protest secessionist Conch Republic. Tarracino spoke of his two-year term in the office as "the greatest two years of my life."

Tarracino was the author of Life Lessons of a Legend with Brad Manard. At the time of his death, Wendy Tucker, a former Miami Herald reporter was ghostwriting his autobiography, The Breaks.

== Personal life ==
Tarracino had several wives and was married to his fourth, Marty, for 38 years at the time of his death. He fathered 13 children, including former Survivor: The Australian Outback contestant, Keith Famie. His youngest child, Tony Tarracino Jr., was born when Captain Tony was age 70. He outlived his first three wives, Mimi, Mae, and Shirley, and one of his sons.

== Cultural impact ==
Tarracino was portrayed by Stuart Whitman in Cuba Crossing, a 1980 movie about adventurers who get caught up in a plot to kill Fidel Castro. Gulf and Western singer-songwriter Jimmy Buffett, who managed one of his unsuccessful mayoral bids, wrote and sang "Last Mango in Paris" about the tales of Tarracino. The song begins with the lines "I went down to Captain Tony's / To get out of the heat / I heard a voice call out to me / 'Son come have a seat'."
