= Dennis Wardlow =

American politician and micronation founder

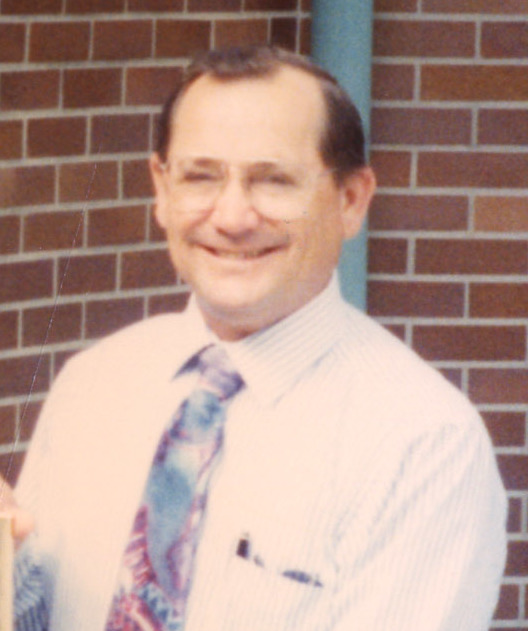
- Dennis Wardlow in 1995

Ceremonial Prime Minister of the Conch Republic
- Incumbent
- Assumed office 23 April 1982
- Preceded by: Office established

Mayor of Key West
- In office 1995–1997
- Preceded by: Tom Sawyer
- Succeeded by: Sheila Mullins
- In office 1991–1995
- Preceded by: Tony Tarracino
- Succeeded by: Tom Sawyer
- In office 1981–1983
- Preceded by: Charles "Sonny" McCoy
- Succeeded by: Richard Heyman

Personal details
- Born: c. 1944

Dennis Wardlow (born c. 1944) is a former mayor of Key West, Florida, having served on three occasions.

He is known for being the prime minister of the Conch Republic, the micronation that seceded from the United States on April 23, 1982, in protest over a United States Border Patrol blockade which severely damaged the tourism economy of the Florida Keys.
