= Richard Heyman =

Richard Heyman may refer to:

- Richard A. Heyman (1935–1994), mayor of Key West, Florida
- Richard X. Heyman (born 1951), singer-songwriter
