= Captain Tony's Saloon =

Bar in Key West, Florida, United States

Coordinates: 24.55883°N 81.80549°W

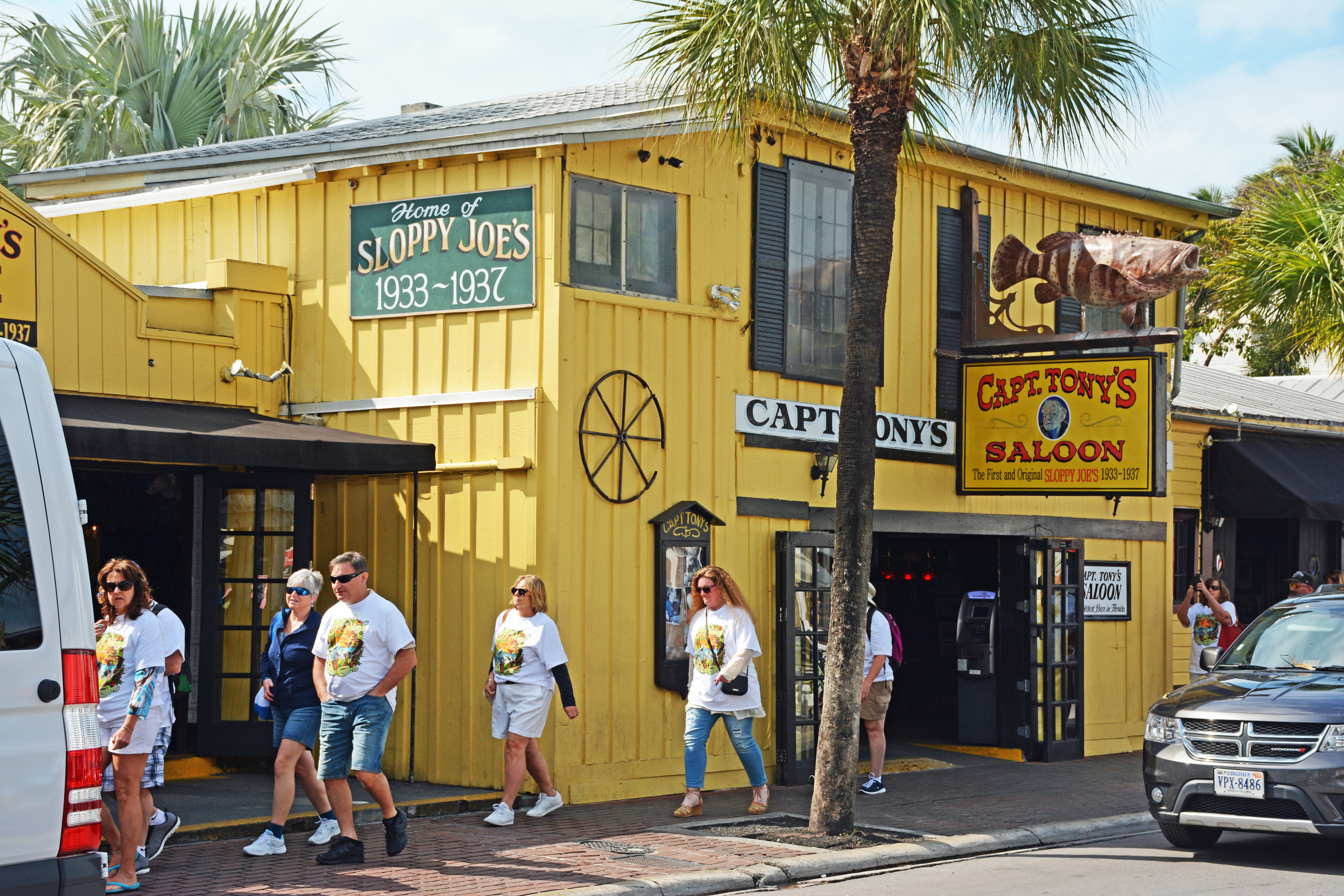
The bar in 2017

Captain Tony's Saloon is a bar in Key West, Florida, United States, located at 428 Greene Street.

The bar has been patronized through the years by many well-known artists, writers and celebrities. When a celebrity visits, a barstool is added that is painted with that patron's name. The bar includes barstools painted with the names of Ernest Hemingway, Truman Capote, Jimmy Buffett, Shel Silverstein, John Prine, John F. Kennedy and Harry Truman, Mike Leach, among others.

Above the sign outside the building is a large Atlantic goliath grouper that Captain Tony caught and had preserved. It is said that if you throw a quarter into the mouth of the fish, good luck will follow you until you leave the island.

== History ==
The building housing Captain Tony's Saloon has a history as colorful as the town of Key West itself. When first constructed in 1852, 428 Greene Street was an ice house that doubled as the city morgue. In the 1890s, it housed a wireless telegraph station. The telegraph's most important utilization came in 1898, during the Spanish–American War. The battleship Maine was destroyed, as the news came from Havana to Key West and it was reported all over the world from this building. In 1912, the building was home to a cigar factory. Later, it was a bordello and a bar popular with the Navy until it was forced out of business. After that, it became several speakeasies, the last of which was named The Blind Pig, specializing in gambling, women, and bootleg rum.

By the 1930s, a local named Josie Russell bought the business and created Sloppy Joe's Bar. This was where Ernest Hemingway spent most of his evenings between 1933 and 1937. In 1938, when the building's landlord raised the rent one dollar per week, Russell and his customers picked up the entire bar and moved everything to Sloppy Joe's current location at 201 Duval Street. The bar went through several iterations over the years and was finally shuttered until David Wolkowsky inherited it from his father in 1962. Wolkowsky restored the bar and named it "The Oldest Bar". In 1968, Tony Tarracino (called Captain Tony), a local charter boat captain, purchased the bar from Wolkowsky and named it Captain Tony's Saloon.

As Captain Tony's, the bar is where Jimmy Buffett got his start in Key West. Buffett played Capt. Tony's in the early 1970s and was often paid in tequila. Buffett immortalized the bar and Tarracino himself, in his song "Last Mango in Paris". On occasion, Jimmy made surprise appearances at the bar, but only performed at his own place around the corner called Margaritaville Cafe. Bob Dylan, who released the song "Key West (Philosopher Pirate)" in 2020, has frequented the cafe over the years, resulting in his name being painted on a bar stool.

Tarracino sold the bar in 1989, but continued to appear there most Thursdays to greet customers and fans until his death in November 2008.

== Popular culture ==
- The Conch that Roared, Gregory W. King
- Jimmy Buffett: The Man from Margaritaville Revealed, Steve Eng
- Jimmy Buffett includes a reference to the bar in the song "Last Mango in Paris"
- Panama, Thomas McGuane
