= Hemingway Days =

Annual Ernest Hemingway festival

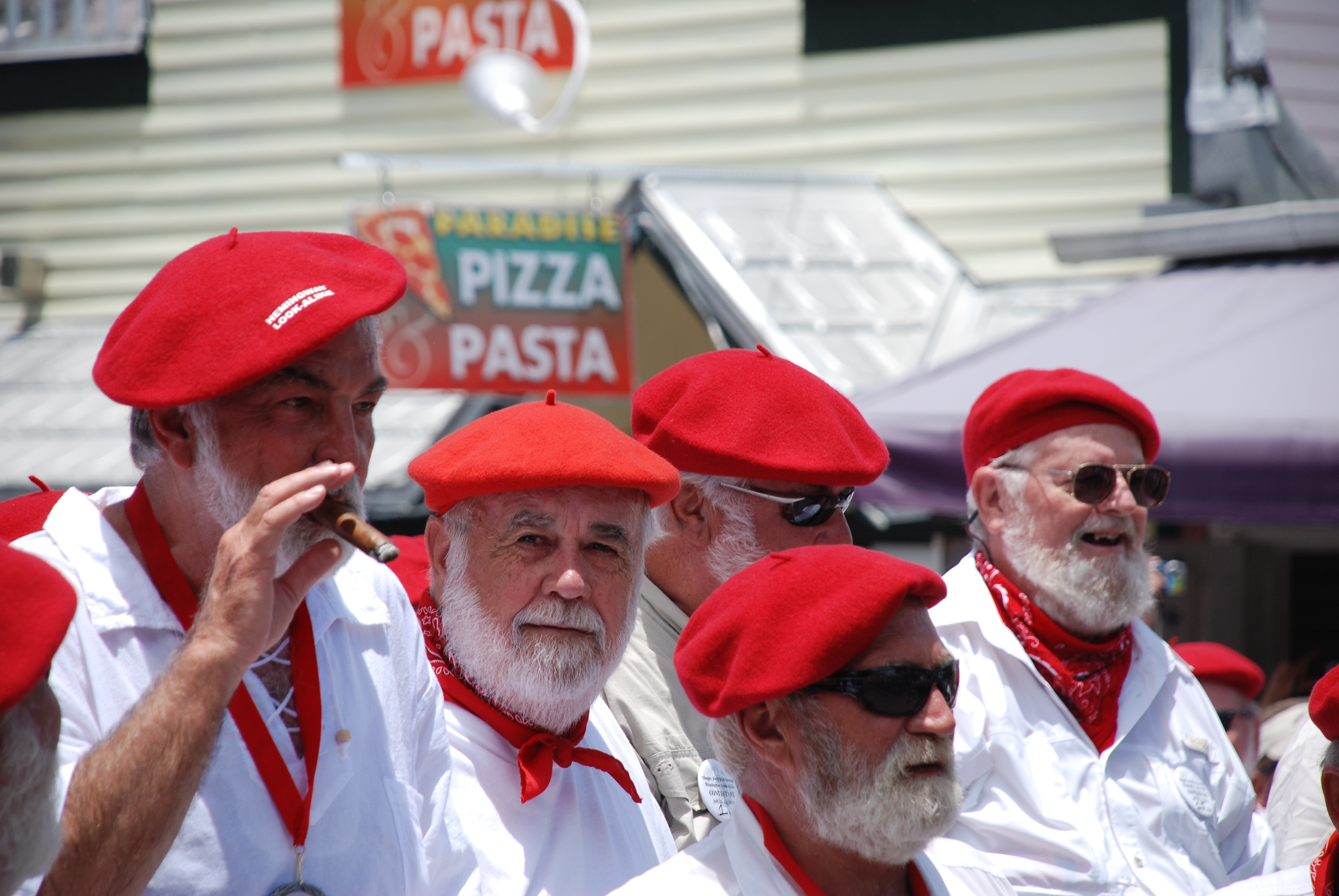
- Papas at the "running of the bulls" event at Hemingway Days 2011
- Frequency: Annually
- Venue: Sloppy Joe's
- Locations: Key West, Florida
- Years active: 1981-present
- Founder: Michael Walton

Hemingway Days is an annual celebration of the life of Nobel Prize winning author Ernest Hemingway in Key West, Florida. The festival runs for three days each year, coinciding with July 21, Hemingway's birthday. The festival was founded in 1981 by Michael Walton as a promotional stunt for Sloppy Joe's Bar, of which Hemingway was a frequent patron when he lived in Key West. It most notably features the yearly Hemingway Look-Alike Contest, which is operated by the Hemingway Look-Alike Society.

Other attractions include a “running of the bulls” spoof, a street fair and the Key West Marlin Tournament which is a fishing competition, and a short story competition.

== Background ==
Ernest Hemingway lived in Key West, Florida, for 12 years, mostly when he was in his 30s; he visited and then quickly moved to the island in 1928 and lived there until late 1939. During this time, he published A Farewell to Arms (1929), which he had already written, and wrote some of his most famous works including To Have and Have Not (1937) and For Whom the Bell Tolls (1940), the former being about Key West during the Great Depression. He covered the Spanish Civil War in the late 1930s.

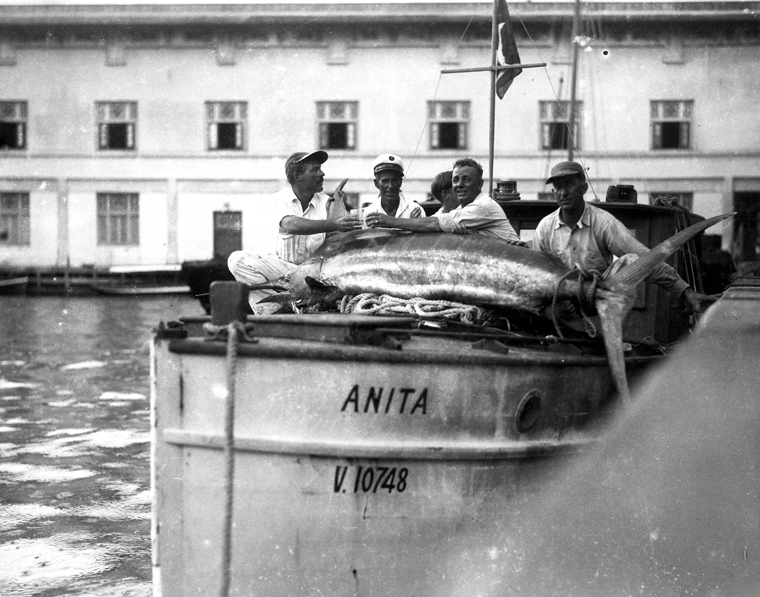
Hemingway frequently went fishing while living in Key West

Spending his mornings writing and the rest of the day fishing and drinking, he became a frequent patron of Sloppy Joe's Bar in this period of his life, and spent time big-game fishing with local fishermen he made friends with, eventually obtaining his own boat, the Pilar, in 1934.

== History ==
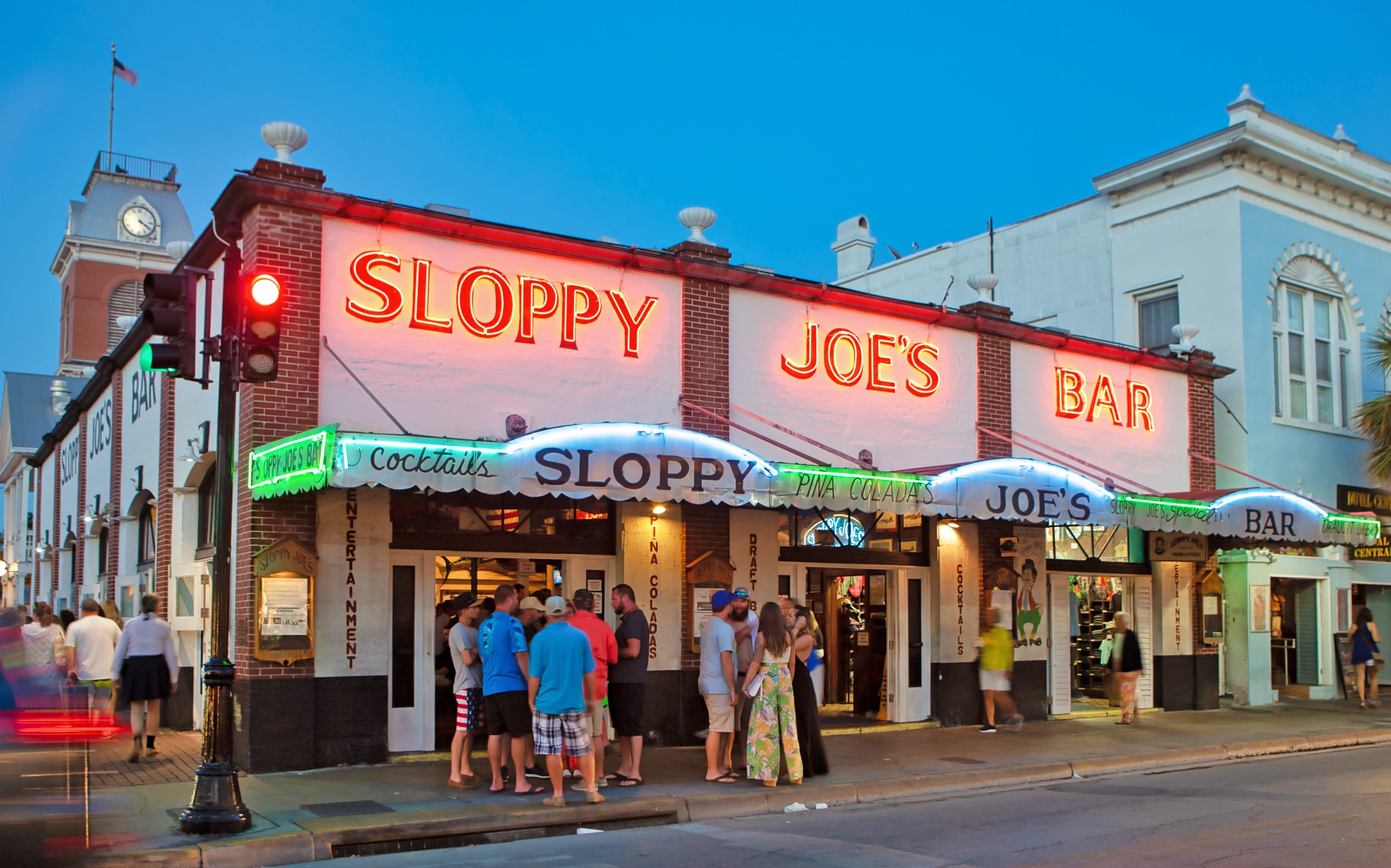
Sloppy Joe's Bar

In December 1980, manager of Sloppy Joe's Bar Michael Walton read about a Bad Hemingway Contest in which writers parody Hemingway's writing style. As a promotional stunt for Sloppy Joe's Bar, he decided to centre a look-alike contest and other events around Hemingway's birthday on July 21, during a slow, humid season for the bar. Hemingway Days thus began in 1981, featuring a short story competition, the Hemingway Look-Alike Contest, a Caribbean street fair, an arm wrestling tournament, and a "running of the bulls". The literary aspect of the occasion was relatively lightweight, with an emphasis being placed on its social side, and the bull running portion of the event was retired due to safety issues in the summer weather. On one early year, the United States Postmaster General unveiled a first-day-of issue 25 cent stamp bearing Hemingway's image.

Walton moved to West Virginia in the mid-1990s after 16 years running the event. It was not held in 2020 due to the COVID-19 pandemic, with most contestants being between 60 and 80 years old, an age group susceptible to the virus.

== Hemingway Look-Alike Contest ==
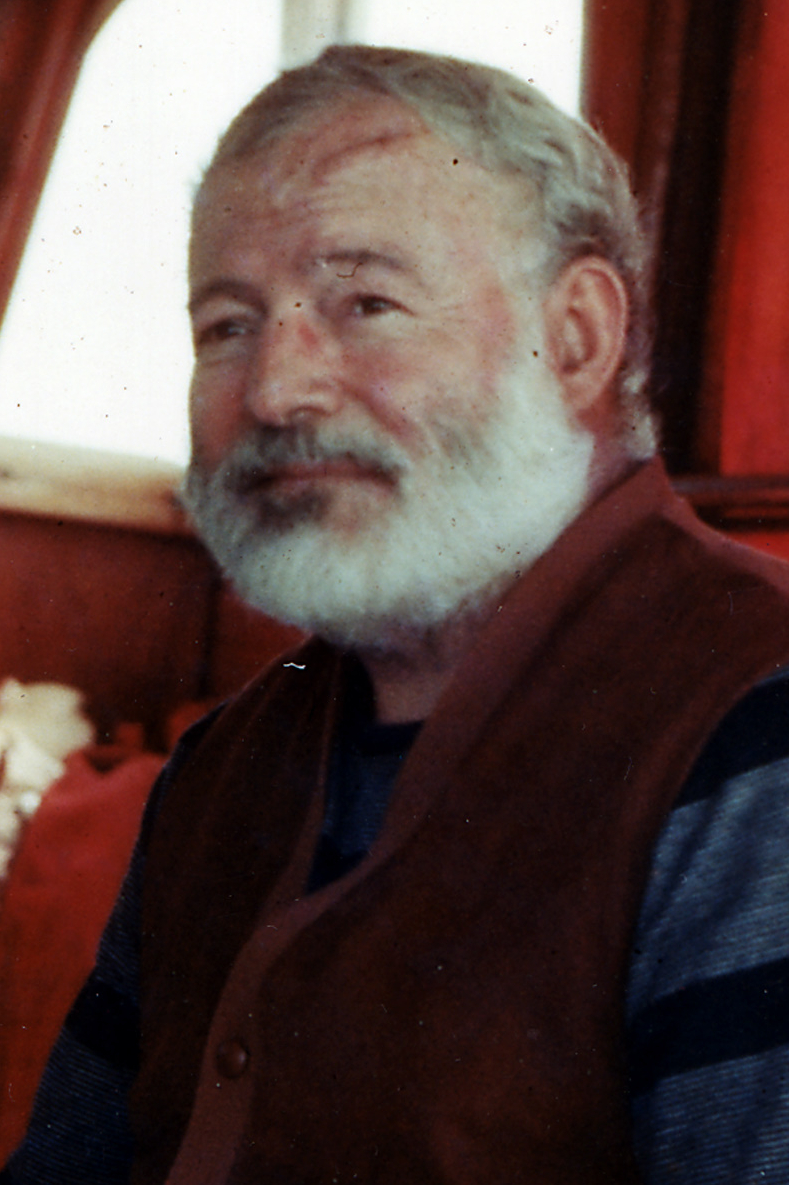
Contestants often mimic Hemingway in his later years, known as "Papa", rather than his appearance when he lived in Key West in his 30s.

The Hemingway Look-Alike Contest is an annual contest held since Hemingway Days' first event in 1981. It is held at Sloppy Joe's. in which contestants compete to be Hemingway's best look-alike. It is held by the Hemingway Look-Alike Society.

The contest takes place over three days, with two preliminary rounds, and a final taking place on the last day. Previous winners of the competition form a panel of judges. Contestants, who are often "heavy-set" men and largely wear khakis or fishermen’s sweaters, take turns to imitate Hemingway's mannerisms, often adopting the "Papa" persona from Hemingway's later years. As a result, winners are often referred to as "Papas", whereas contestants who have not won are called "Wannabes" No cash prize is offered for the winner. A spokesman for the society stated in 2015 that some competitors had returned to compete in the contest for up to 20 years without winning.

=== History ===
The contest has been held since Hemingway Days' first event in 1981, inspired by the Bad Hemingway Contest that Whalton read about in 1980. For its first iteration, Whalton simply "called everybody [he] knew in Key West who ha[d] a beard."

The Hemingway Look-Alike Society was later established. Over time, it developed into a service organization which, as of July 2024, has funded more than $350,000 in scholarships for Florida Keys students and sponsors a youth baseball team in Cuba. David Douglas, who had begun attending the contest in 2000 and won it in 2009, is the current president of the society as of July 2024. During the 2023 festival, the Hemingway Look-Alike Society amassed close to $125,000 for scholarships for Keys students. In 2024, eighteen of its society members visited Havana to honor Hemingway amidst tense relations between Cuba and the United States.

=== Contests ===
Year	Contestants	Winner	Age	Notes	Ref.
1981 (1st)	36	Tom Feeney		The contest was judged by Hemingway's brother Leicester Hemingway.	
1982 (2nd)		Richard Parrish			
1983 (3rd)		Leo Rost			
1984 (4th)		Bill Young			
1985 (5th)		Michael Dallette			
1986 (6th)		Fred Johnson			
1987 (7th)		Jack Waterbury			
1988 (8th)		Tom Cosselman			
1989 (9th)		Richard Royston			
1990 (10th)		Fred Burnham			
1991 (11th)		Bob Anderson			
1992 (12th)		George Burley			
1993 (13th)		Frank Meitz			
1994 (14th)		John Peterson			
1995 (15th)	102	Bill Fountain			
1996 (16th)		Roger Hegemier			
1997 (17th)		Bart Barton			
1998 (18th)		Don Duncan			
1999 (19th)		Rick Kirvan			
2000 (20th)		Carlie Coley			
2001 (21st)		Denny Woods			
2002 (22nd)		Ron Thomas			
2003 (23rd)		Mike Stack			
2004 (24th)		John Stubbings			
2005 (25th)		Bob Doughty			
2006 (26th)		Chris Storm			
2007 (27th)		Larry Austin			
2008 (28th)		Tom Grizzard			
2009 (29th)	140	David Douglas	55	Douglas had begun attending the contest in 2000, and later became president of the Hemingway Look-Alike Society.	
2010 (30th)	124	Charles Bicht	64	Bicht won on his twelfth attempt.	
2011 (31st)	121	Matt Gineo	64	Gineo, a biomedical engineer, won on his twelfth attempt. He stated that it "was something that I had in my heart to do, but I didn't know how many years it would take".	
2012 (32nd)	140	Greg Fawcett	64	Frank Louderback, a Florida attourney, asked U.S. District Court Judge Steven Merryday to suspend a trial so he could participate in the contest. The judge denied his request. Fawcett, an investment banker, won on his 10th attempt and credited this win to establishing camaraderie with the judges, timing his haircuts and trimming his beard.	
2013 (33rd)	126	Stephen Terry	56	Photographer Henry Hargreaves attended and created a photo series called Becoming Hemingway in which he attempted to recreate Yousef Karsh's 1957 photograph of the writer.	
2014 (34th)	131	Wally Collins		Collins won on his sixth try against contestants who included his own son.	
2015 (35th)	122	Charlie Boice	56	Boice, a retired air traffic controller, won on his fifteenth attempt.	
2016 (36th)		Dave Hemingway		The contest made headlines due to the winner having the surname Hemingway. Dave Hemingway said he was not related to the author. He won on his seventh attempt.	
2017 (37th)	153	Richard Fillip	71	Fillip piloted a replica of Hemingway's fishing boat Pilar from Miami to Key West to compete in the contest.	
2018 (38th)	151	Michael Groover	62	Groover, the husband of celebrity chef Paula Deen, won on his ninth attempt.	
2019 (39th)	142	Joe Maxey	68	A retired banker, Maxey won on his eighth attempt.	
2020	Cancelled due to the COVID-19 pandemic.				
2021 (40th)	137	Zach Taylor			
2022 (41st)	124	Jon Auvil	65	Auvil, a real estate attourney, won on his eighth attempt.	
2023 (42nd)	Almost 140	Gerrit Marshall	68	Marshall, a retired television broadcast engineer, won the contest on his 68th birthday and on his eleventh attempt.	
2024 (43rd)	122	David "Bat" Masterson		Masterson is a helicopter pilot. He won on his tenth attempt by singing a themed parody of the Garth Brooks song "Friends in Low Places".	
2025 (44th)	131	Tim Stockwell	69	Stockwell, a Key West local who had participated since 2019, was the eighth to win while wearing a wool sweater. Three younger look-alikes, including a six-year-old, took part.	

== Other events ==
Hemingway Days' Running of the Bulls contest is a parody of the running of the bulls run held in Pamplona, Spain, in which the Hemingway look-alikes parade through downtown Key West with a "herd" of life-size fake bulls on wheels. A Hemingway Days Writers' Workshop and Conference was introduced in 1989, being conducted by Dr. James Plath. As of 2015, an annual short story competition at the event was run by Lorian Hemingway, Hemingway's granddaughter. A street fair and the Key West Marlin Tournament, which is a fishing competition are also held.

== See also ==
- 2024 look-alike contests
- International Imitation Hemingway Competition
