= Keith Famie =

American film director (born 1960)

- Born: February 11, 1960 (age 66); Farmington Hills, Michigan, US
- Known for: Survivor: The Australian Outback
- Parent: Tony Tarracino (biological father)
- Website: keithfamie.com

Keith Famie (born February 11, 1960, in Farmington Hills, Michigan) is an American chef-restaurateur and film director and producer. He famously appeared in Survivor: The Australian Outback (2001), finishing in third place.

== Pre-Survivor culinary career ==
Famie worked in restaurant kitchens while attending high school and in hotels around the world, including Brussels, Monte Carlo, and New York City, after high school graduation. Total amount of existing restaurants he worked globally was twenty-seven, and his prior occupations ranged from head dishwasher to head chef. By no later than 1987, he was the executive chef of Chez Raphael (Novi, Michigan) and wrote a travel cookbook The Flavor of Famie.

Famie opened a 200-seat American bistro Les Auteurs in the Royal Oak, Michigan, one year later in 1988. Its sales figures were $1.8 million in 1991 (equivalent to $4.3 million in 2025) and $1,920,710 in 1992 (equivalent to $4,406,656 in 2025). Also in early 1990s, Les Auteurs held seventy employees.

Famie appeared alongside another chef Edward Janos in a 1988 cooking video Feathered Fowl and Game. (Note: The 1988 video is also called Cooking with Feathered Game and Poultry.) He was one of twelve finalists in 1988 competing to represent the United States for the January 1989 Bocuse d'Or championship. He lost the spot to another finalist Jeff Jackson. Famie also was listed by Food & Wine in 1989 as one of the "[ten] best new chefs". He alongside one of his recipes was featured in the 1990 Great Chefs of America calendar.

Famie established a rotisserie take-out chain Famie's Chicken in early 1990, which was eventually short-lived by no later than 1993. Between 1988 and 1993, he further established the Les Auteurs School of Cooking and a fifty-seat bar and restaurant Madison's. He also released a series of trading cards featuring chefs—a picture of a chef on obverse side; a chef's recipe on reverse side—starting in 1992. Ten percent of gross profits of the trading cards were sent to the Rainbow Connection, a non-profit charity assisting terminally ill children.

Famie closed the increasingly struggling Les Auteurs on June 27, 1993, and re-established the same site as the cowboy-themed Durango Grill in mid-August 1993. Famie sold the Durango Grill concept in September 1994 to and then joined Buscemi International, hoping to expand the business nationwide. Durango Grill was then closed in 1995.

Famie became a chef of a brasserie Forte in Birmingham, Michigan, in no later than 1997.

== Pre-Survivor television and film career ==
Famie founded a film company Visionalist Entertainment Productions in 1995. He produced a five-part television series covering Japanese cooking for WDIV-TV (Detroit) in late 1990s and the 1990s Detroit-produced travel and food series Keith Famie's Adventures in Cooking, later called Famie's Adventures in Cooking, seen by about 400,000 viewers of Detroit as of 1998. He produced a documentary special From Hanoi to China Beach: A Taste of the Exotic, shown in Fox Theatre (Detroit) for a charity event International Evening: Vietnam on August 28, 1999, and then aired two days later on WDIV-TV.

Famie's Visionist and another company Mexicantown Community Development Corporation produced another film A Journey to Mexico, also called A Journey Home, which explores immigration from Jesús María and St. Ignacio of central Mexico to Detroit, in January 2000. The film was conceptualized by Mexicantown's then-president Maria Elena Rodriguez, and its crew consisted of eleven people. The film premiered in the Detroit Opera House on May 11, 2000. It then aired on WDIV-TV on June 24, 2000.

Before Survivor, Famie appeared on regularly a WDIV-TV news program's cooking segment and on another television program Famie's Wild Aussie Adventures.

== Survivor: The Australian Outback ==
Famie was one of forty-eight applicants shortlisted for Survivor: Borneo. However, he was filming A Journey Home at the time, affecting his chances to be cast. He eventually appeared on Survivor: The Australian Outback (2001) as part of the Ogakor tribe. He often clashed with bartender/actress Jerri Manthey over position to support the tribe, much to annoyance of the remaining Ogakor tribe. The tribe criticized his rice cooking as poorly executed but then praised his fish cooking as well executed. However, his overall social gameplay was perceived as subpar.

After two Ogakor members were voted off, in Ogakor's third Tribal Council, votes against Famie and Mitchell Olson, who admitted at the Council being physically weaker than Famie, were tied 3–3. In the re-vote, Famie and Mitchell were ineligible to vote. Votes against them were tied again 2–2. To break the second tie, vote casts in prior Councils were considered. Famie was not voted before, but a vote against Olson was cast in one prior Council, causing Olson to be eliminated. Thus, Manthey's alliance that voted against Famie weakened.

When the Ogakor and Kucha tribes merged into the Barramundi tribe, ten overall contestants remained—five each of their own tribe. (Note: A Kucha member Michael Skupin was medically evacuated before the merger due to burn injuries from falling into a campfire after passing out.) Furthermore, the former Ogakor tribe was still divided between two alliances: one consisted of Manthey and Amber Brkich; another of Famie, Colby Donaldson, and Tina Wesson. (Note: In the season finale onscreen, at the Final Tribal Council, eventual winner Tina Wesson admitted to the jury forming an alliance with Famie and Colby Donaldson. As further revealed, Wesson and Donaldson formed their own core alliance and used and kept Famie as part of their voting strategy, especially to maintain the Ogakor tribe's strength.) Famie won the season's first two individual immunity challenges, (Note: In the season's first Individual Immunity challenge, ten remaining contestants stood on their own pillars at a river. After ten hours and eighteen hours passed, only Famie and Tina Wesson remained until she stepped down from the challenge, leading him to win the Individual Immunity necklace.) while the ex-Ogakor members, despite division among them, voted two ex-Kucha members off the merged tribe consecutively. (Note: In Barramundi's first Tribal Council, votes against an ex-Kucha member Jeff Varner and an ex-Ogakor member Colby Donaldson were tied 5–5 and then 4–4 in a revote. To break the second tie, Varner was eliminated based on votes cast against him in prior Councils, while votes against Donaldson had never been cast previously.)

Then, getting tired onscreen of her personality, antics, and clashes with some other remaining players besides Famie, (Note: Jerri Manthey and Tina Wesson's offscreen clashes were rarely shown in Survivor: The Australian Outback.) Manthey was voted off the merged tribe. The eliminations of other remaining ex-Kucha members (Note: Before Jerri Manthey was voted off the tribe, the Ogakor alliance primarily targeted one of remaining ex-Kucha members Nick Brown. Brown won the Individual Immunity necklace from one challenge, making Brown immune from elimination until the next immunity challenge.) and Brkich, the only remaining member of Manthey's alliance, followed. (Note: After Colby Donaldson won one of individual reward challenges and before ex-Ogakor member Amber Brkich was voted out, a heavy storm washed away the Barramundi camp and most of its food supply. Famie and Tina Wesson found the remaining can of rice seen at a violent river and were able to retrieve it.) When three players remained, Donaldson won the quiz about eliminated contestants, the season's final immunity challenge. As the only player eligible to vote while possessing the Individual Immunity necklace, Donaldson voted off Famie, who Donaldson believed was unworthy to be one of the final two, and took the eventual winner Wesson to the Final Tribal Council. (Note: Famie stated that, if he won the "Fallen Comrades" immunity challenge, he would have voted out Colby Donaldson as a potential threat. Tina Wesson stated that, if she won the challenge, she would have voted out Famie and kept Donaldson in as promised, figuring that Donaldson would be popular to viewers.) Consequently, Famie finished third, became the seventh and final jury member, and then earned $85,000 (equivalent to $155,000 in 2025).

== Post-Survivor culinary and television career ==
Famie wrote another cookbook Famie's Adventures in Cooking, released in March 2001 by Sleeping Bear Press and named after his Detroit-produced series. He hosted Food Network's eight-episode special series Taste the Adventure, which aired on June 17–24, 2001. That same year, he received two round-trip tickets to China during his appearance in The Rosie O'Donnell Show and wrote another cookbook Yes I Can Cook Rice ... and So Can You, released in late October 2001. He also wrote a 2003 cookbook You Really Haven't Been There Until You've Eaten the Food, co-authored by a Detroit Free Press wine columnist Chris Kassel and imprinted by Clarkson Potter.

Famie also appeared in another Food Network series Keith Famie's Adventures, which debuted on January 7, 2002, and ran thirty-two episodes. (Note: The preceding Food Network special Keith Famie's African Adventure aired on November 12, 2001.) He also appeared in a WXYZ-TV series Our Story Of, which covered various communities, such as Greek Americans, Arab Americans, and Italian Americans.

Famie declined to appear on Survivor: All-Stars (2004) in order to care for his ailing non-biological, adoptive father, a World War II veteran suffering from Alzheimer's disease until the veteran's death on December 3, 2003. Famie ran a course with a disabled nine-year-old male leukemia patient for sixteen hours and twenty-six minutes at the Ironman Triathlon in Kona, Hawaii, on October 18, 2003, for charity to the Leukemia & Lymphoma Society.

== Documentary filmmaking career ==
The ninety-minute director's cut version of the documentary film Detroit: Our Greatest Generation, which paid tribute to World War II veterans in Michigan and was produced by Famie's company Visionalist Entertainment Productions, was first shown in Fox Theatre on December 13, 2009. Then the one-hour version aired without commercials on WDIV-TV on December 16, 2009. The film and Famie's film Can You See How I See?, which addressed Iraq War and Afghan War veterans who lost sight in combat, aired on PBS stations in 2010.

Visionalist held the August 22, 2010, public fundraiser in the Royal Park Hotel (Rochester, Michigan) to support Famie's documentary film Our Vietnam Generation, which paid tribute to Vietnam War veterans. The film premiered in Fox Theatre on January 28, 2011, and then aired on PBS stations on February 21, 2011.

Famie's biographical documentary film One's Soldier's Story covers a Monroe native Michael Ingram Jr., a sergeant killed in action at age twenty-three in Afghanistan on April 17, 2010. The film was shown on June 14 and 29, 2011, in Canton and Royal Oak, one theatre each. It also aired on PBS stations, including WTVS-TV, on September 11, 2011.

Famie also produced two more documentary films that aired on PBS stations: Live Like There's No Tomorrow (2012), which covers Jill Jack's life and musical career; two series of The Embrace of Aging (2013)—one about males, another about females.

Famie's biographical documentary Maire's Journey covers a Goodrich resident Maire Caitlin Kent, who died from angiosarcoma at age 24 on September 27, 2013. The film was screened in Traverse City's State Theatre on May 1, 2016. He wrote a 2016 nonfiction book Maire's Journey to the Sea also about Maire Kent.

Famie's documentary film Death Is Not the Answer, which tackles depression and suicide, debuted in one Royal Oak theatre on November 6, 2016, and then aired as a two-part program on PBS stations, including WTVS-TV, five days later. His another documentary film Entitled, which covers military recruitment, was screened in The Patriot Theatre (Grosse Pointe Farms) on May 23, 2018.

Famie's documentary film Those on the Front Lines of Alzheimer's and Dementia, which covers military veterans diagnosed with Alzheimer's disease or dementia, was screened in Royal Oak Music Theatre on June 3, 2018, and then aired on WTVS-TV and other PBS stations on June 27, 2018. Famie dedicated the film to his father who died in 2003. His documentary film Those on the Front Lines of Cancer was screened in one Royal Oak theatre on October 2, 2018. It then aired as two parts—first was one-hour; second, two-hour—on WTVS-TV October 10 and 17, 2018, and then on other PBS stations nationwide on July 19, 2020.

Famie's biographical documentary film Blessed Solanus Casey's Journey to Sainthood, which is about a priest Solanus Casey, debuted in one Novi theatre on December 16, 2019, and aired on PBS stations ten days later.

Famie's book Papa's Rules for Life was released in 2021 by Mission Point Press amid the COVID-19 pandemic. His another documentary film Shoah Ambassadors, which covers the Holocaust, debuted in a Novi theatre on November 11, 2021, and then aired on PBS stations one week later.

Famie's documentary film Detroit: The City of Chefs, which covers history of locally known Detroit chefs, debuted in a Novi theatre on December 9, 2024, and then aired on PBS stations three days later. Its sequel Detroit: The City of Chefs II debuted in a Novi theatre on September 7, 2025, and then aired on PBS stations on October 24 of the same year.

== Personal life ==
Famie has two children from his previous marriage, which ended with divorce.

Famie's biological father was Tony Tarracino, a retired bartender, former boat captain, and former Key West mayor. Famie is one of Tarracino's fourteen biological children. Famie and Tarracino met for the first time in Pepe's Cafe & Steakhouse (Caroline Street) about five years prior to Survivor: The Australian Outback.

== Selected bibliography ==
- The Flavor of Famie (mid-1980s)
- Famie's Adventures in Cooking (2001) – named after the television series of the same name
- Yes I Can Cook Rice ... and So Can You (2001)
- You Really Haven't Been There Until You've Eaten the Food (2003) – co-authored by Detroit Free Press author Chris Kessel
- Maire's Journey to the Sea (2016)
- Papa's Rules for Life (2021)

== Selected filmography ==
- Keith Famie's Adventures in Cooking, also called Famie's Adventures in Cooking (1990s)
- A Journey to Mexico (2000), also called A Journey Home
- Survivor: The Australian Outback (2001) – finished in third-place; earned $85,000
- Keith Famie's African Adventure (2001)
- Keith Famie's Adventures (2002)
- Detroit: Our Greatest Generation (2009)
- Can You See How I See? (2010)
- Our Vietnam Generation (2011)
- One's Soldier's Story (2012)
- Live Like There's No Tomorrow (2012)
- The Embrace of Aging: The Male Perspective of Growing Old (2013)
- The Embrace of Aging: The Female Perspective of Growing Old (2013)
- Maire's Journey (2013)
- Death Is Not the Answer (2016)
- Entitled (2018)
- Those on the Front Lines of Alzheimer's and Dementia (2018)
- Those on the Front Lines of Cancer (2018)
- Blessed Solanus Casey's Journey to Sainthood (2019)
- Shoah Ambassadors (2021)
- Detroit: The City of Chefs (2024)
- Detroit: The City of Chefs II (2025)
