= Teri Johnston =

American politician (born 1951)

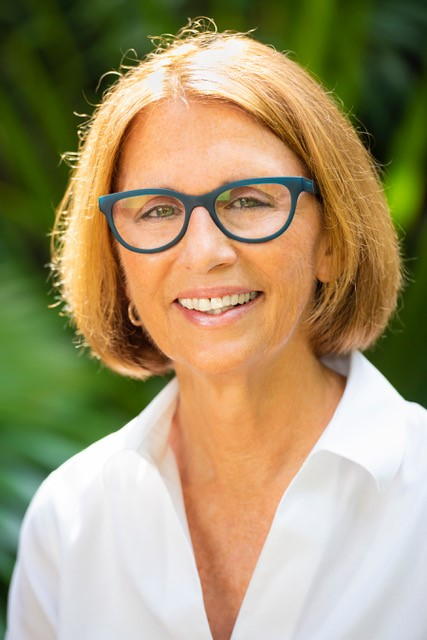

Mayor of Key West
- In office November 19, 2018 – August 25, 2024
- Preceded by: Craig Cates
- Succeeded by: Danise "Dee Dee" Henriquez

Personal details
- Born: July 2, 1951 (age 74) Conrad, Iowa

Teri Johnston (born July 2, 1951) is an American politician. In November 2018 she was elected the mayor of Key West, becoming the first openly lesbian woman to be elected as a city mayor in Florida history. Johnston is the second woman to serve as mayor of Key West.

== Career ==
Johnston served as city commissioner of Key West, Florida for eight years before running for mayor in 2018. She defeated Margaret Romero in the general election, receiving 6,635 votes. She is the first openly lesbian woman to be elected mayor of a Florida city. Additionally, she is the first woman to serve as mayor of Key West since Sheila Mullins' term in the 1990s. She is the second woman to serve as mayor of Key West. Johnston reportedly spent $116,000 on campaigning. She was sworn in to office on November 19, 2018, succeeding Craig Cates.

== Personal life ==
Johnston is originally from Iowa.
