= Southernmost Point Buoy =

Structure in Key West, Florida

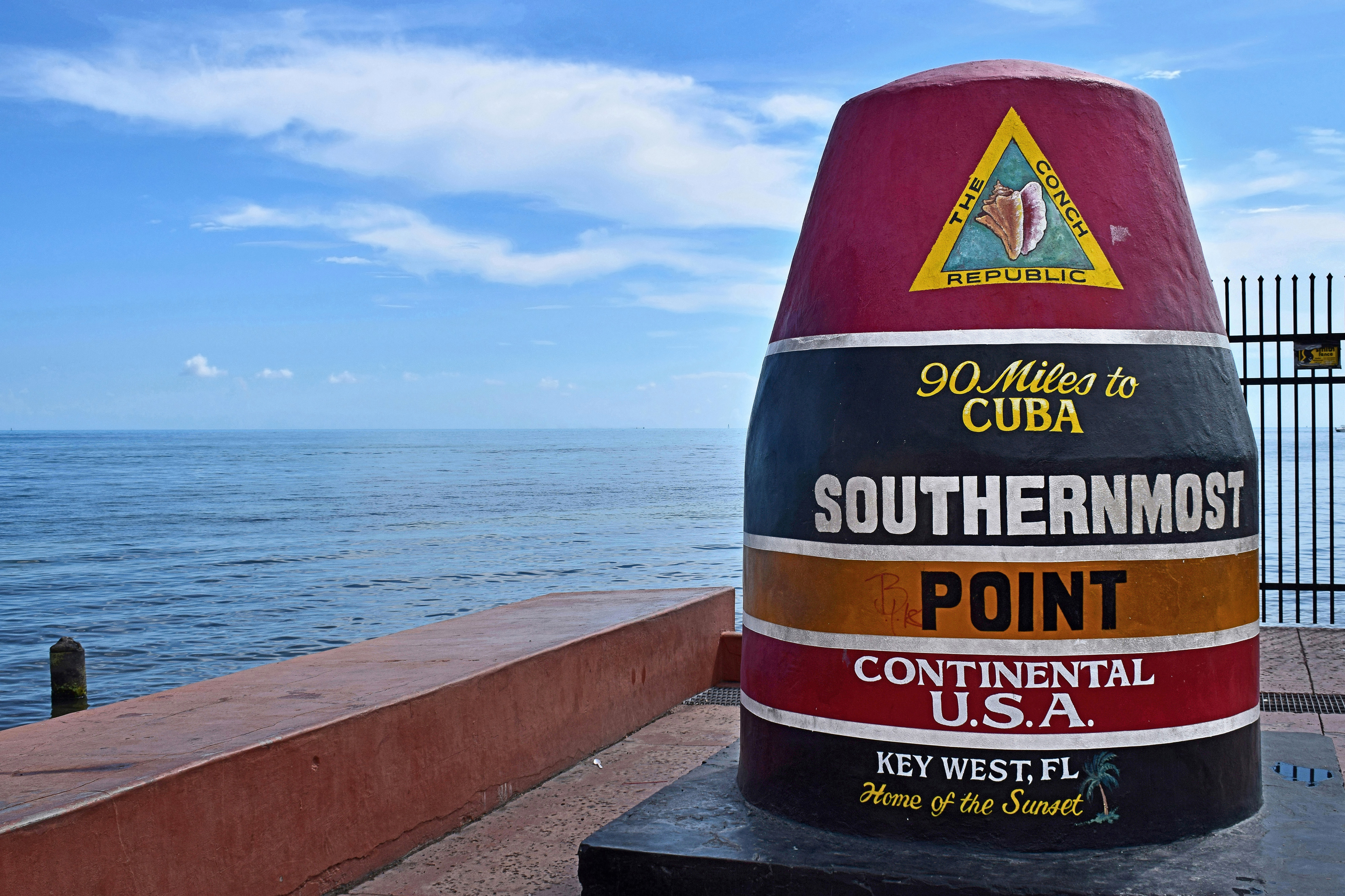
- Concrete marker designating the "southernmost point" in the continental United States at the corner of South and Whitehead Streets
- Interactive map of Southernmost Point Buoy
- Location: Key West, Florida
- Designer: Danny Acosta
- Material: Concrete
- Width: 7 feet (2.1 m)
- Height: 12 feet (3.7 m)
- Completion date: September 10, 1983; 43 years ago
- Restored date: 2017
- Website: https://www.southernmostpointbuoy.com/

The Southernmost Point Buoy is an anchored concrete buoy in Key West, Florida that claims to mark the southernmost point in the continental United States — though it is neither the true southernmost point of the continental US nor of Key West — and was established as a tourist attraction by the city on September 10, 1983. The large painted buoy is 18 feet (5.5 m) above sea level at the corner of South Street and Whitehead Street.

The "southernmost point" was originally marked with a small sign, before the city of Key West erected the now-famous concrete buoy in 1983. The buoy has overall withstood several hurricanes and is a gathering place for photographs and tourists. The paint job was damaged by Hurricane Irma in September 2017, but it was refurbished later that year by the original artist. As indicated on the buoy, Cuba is roughly 90 miles (140 km) south of this point in Key West; this was not originally on the marker, but rather on a smaller sign next to marker.

On September 4th, 2025, a duplicate concrete buoy was installed at the end of nearby Duval St while seawall repair commenced at the corner of Whitehead St and Duval St. The original buoy was painted white and obscured from view.

== Description ==
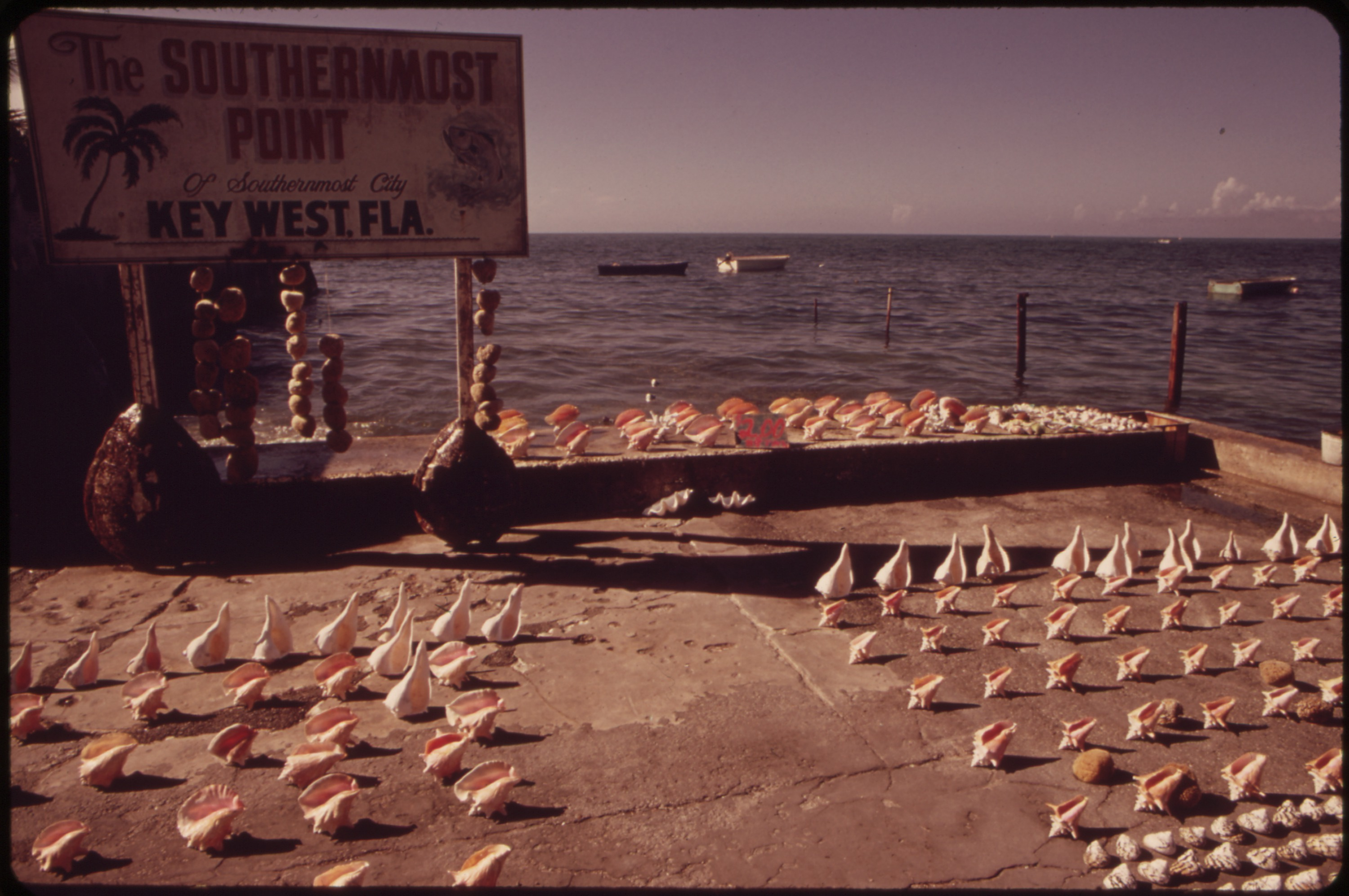
The spot was originally marked with sign, shown here in 1972

Before the concrete buoy there was a wooden sign that noted the southern point at this spot. The old wood sign as of 1970 only said "The Southernmost Point, of Southernmost City, Key West Fla." By 1982 this had changed to "The Southernmost Point, In USA, Key West Fla". There was separate sign on a nearby fence in that area, with an arrow pointing south (in this case to the left) with the text "90 Miles to Cuba".

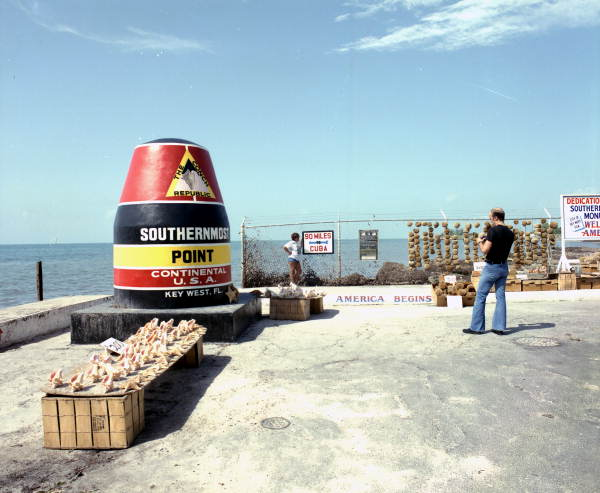
The buoy in the 1980s

The buoy is maintained by the Key West Public Works Department and it was dedicated on September 10, 1983. The painted concrete buoy is 12 feet (3.7 m) tall and 7 feet (2.1 m) wide.

Next to the marker is a cement telegraph hut. This hut housed an underwater telephone cable that connected Key West to Havana in 1921. The cable hut is a small structure just east of the marker where the cable went into the sea.

As of 2024, the buoy is painted with the text:

The Conch Republic
90 Miles to Cuba
Southernmost Point
Continental U.S.A.
Key West, F.L.
Home of the Sunset.

The buoy was refurbished in 2005. The phrases "90 miles to Cuba" and "Home of the Sunset" were not on the 1986 paint job.

In November 1983, the text did not include the line "90 miles to Cuba", which was still written on a smaller sign on fence next to the buoy. Next to the buoy, also as of November 1983, there was a script "America Begins" painted on a curb below the 90 miles to Cuba sign. Also at that time the buoy did not include the text "Home of the Sunset". (see also Mallory Square, which hosts Key West sunset celebration)

By the 2010s, there was a webcam that relays video of the street corner where the buoy is located to the Internet.

The buoy paint job was done by local painter-artist Danny Acosta, and the city of Key West hired him to paint again after it was damaged by Hurricane Irma in 2017.

On New Year's Day 2022, the buoy was vandalized, resulting in "extensive damages"; a camera operated by Two Oceans Digital helped find the two vandals, both of whom faced over $1,000 in damages for criminal mischief.

== Accuracy ==
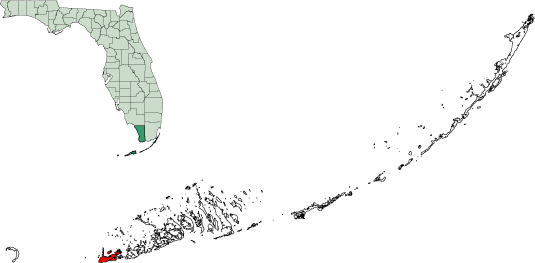
Key West in red on map is part of the Keys, with Monroe County in dark green on an inset map of the State of Florida

A more southern part of Key West Island exists and is publicly accessible: the beach area of Fort Zachary Taylor Historic State Park at approximately 24°32′42.2″N 81°48′34.5″W, and approximately 500 feet (150 m) farther south than the marker.

Further south, land on the Truman Annex property, just west-southwest of the buoy, is the true southernmost point on the island (approximately 900 feet (270 m) farther south near 24°32′39.2″N 81°48′17.8″W, but it has no marker since it is U.S. Navy property and cannot be entered by civilian tourists.

Finally, the true southernmost point in Florida (as well as in the continental United States) is actually 10 miles (16 km) away at Ballast Key 24°31′15.9″N 81°57′49.5″W, an island south and west of Key West.

The claim on the buoy stating "90 miles to Cuba" may be a rounded number, since Cuba, at its closest point is 94 statute miles (82 nautical miles; 151 kilometres) due south. One book author suggests they meant 90 nautical miles (104 statute miles; 167 kilometres), the distance from Key West to Havana, Cuba.

== In popular culture ==
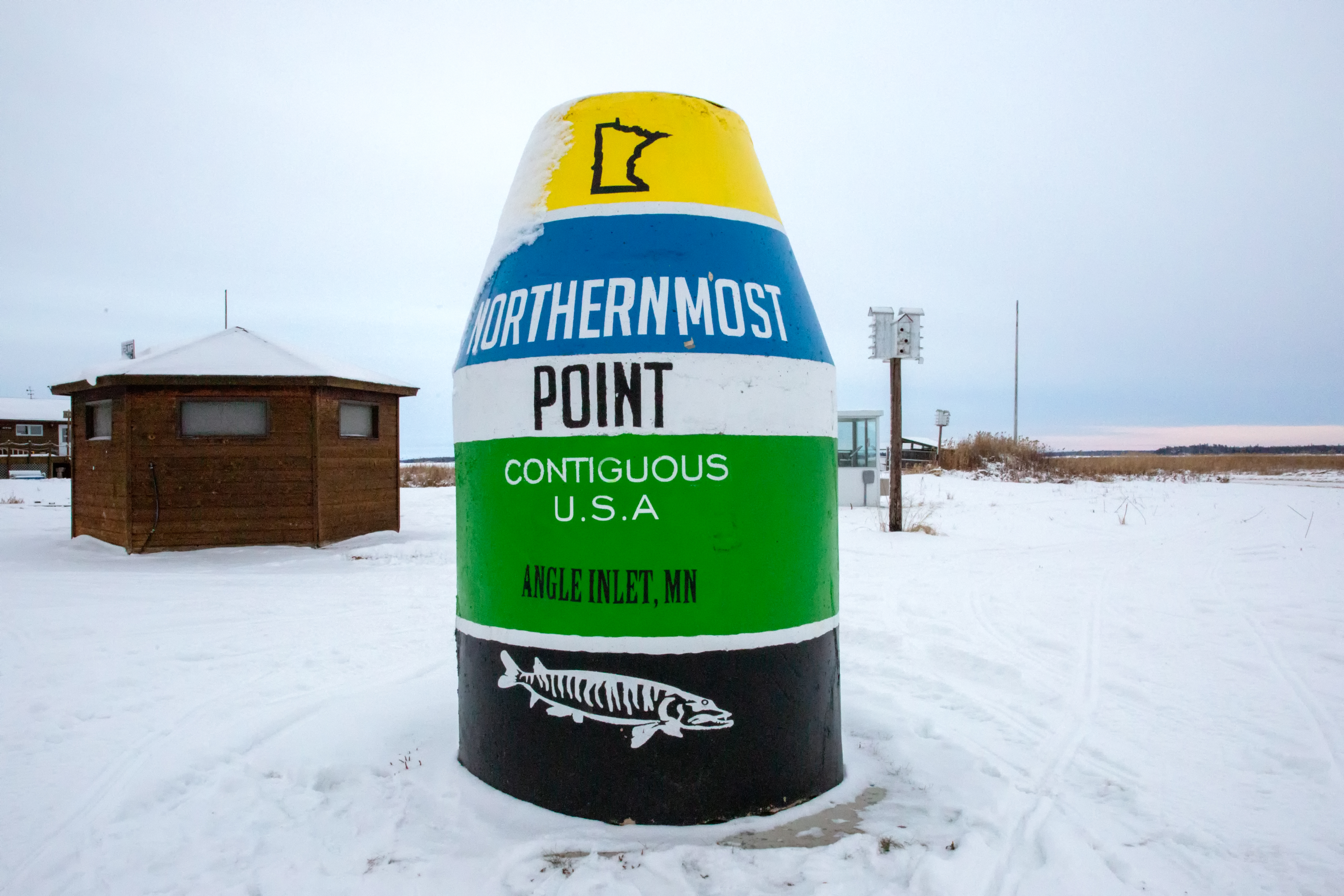
The northernmost point appears modeled after the Key West buoy.

In Callahan's Key (2001) by Spider Robinson the monument is mentioned in the line "The famous, oft-photographed marker at The Southernmost Point which is not."

A subplot of Robert Tacoma's second novel, Key Weirder (2005), involves an interstate dispute over where the true southernmost point is located, and, therefore, where the monument should be placed.

A similar marker in the Northwest Angle of Minnesota was created to indicate the northernmost point in the contiguous United States.

== See also ==
- Cape Sable, southernmost of the Florida peninsula (non-island)
- Palmyra Atoll, southernmost incorporated territory) (5 degrees above equator)
