= Morgan McPherson =

American politician

Mayor of Key West
- In office 2005–2009
- Preceded by: Jim Weekley
- Succeeded by: Craig Cates

Personal details
- Born: 1968 (age 57–58)
- Party: Non-partisan office
- Spouse: Christina McPherson
- City manager: Jim Scholl
- City attorney: Shawn Smith
- City clerk: Cheri Smith

Morgan McPherson (born 1968) was the mayor of Key West, Florida. He was elected in 2005 and defeated for reelection in 2009.

== Election ==
In 2005, Morgan McPherson narrowly defeated incumbent Mayor Jimmy Weekley by 24 votes. Then in 2009 McPherson lost reelection to Craig Cates by over 1,000 votes.

== Education ==
- Key West High School
- Florida State University

== See also ==
- Key West, Florida
