= Chef Distilled =

American rum distillery

Coordinates: 24°33′39″N 81°48′15.7″W

- Industry: Alcoholic beverage
- Founded: 2013
- Founder: Paul Joseph Menta; Tony Mantia
- Headquarters: Key West, Florida, U.S.
- Area served: U.S.
- Products: Rum
- Website: keywestlegalrum.com

Chef Distilled is an American rum distillery founded in 2013 by Paul Joseph Menta in Key West, Florida, in the former Coca-Cola bottling plant on 105 Simonton St. The rum is distilled on site in two custom-made copper pot stills made by Vendome Copper and Brass Works in Louisville, Kentucky.

The distillery and methods of using the Key West heat, humidity and pressure temperature combinations to produce distinct flavors in the rum was featured on The Weather Channel with Jim Cantore which premiered the first day of the 2014 hurricane season.

Chef Distilled was opened on December 5, 2013, precisely at 5:32 pm - the same day and time when the 21st amendment of the US Constitution was ratified. This is an official anniversary of the company.

== The Founder ==
Paul Joseph Menta (born March 1, 1966) is a professional kiteboarder, acclaimed chef and restaurateur of Key West eateries who is also currently serving as the Speaker of the House of the Conch Republic, the micronation that seceded from the United States on April 23, 1982, in protest over a United States Border Patrol blockade which severely damaged the tourism economy of the Florida Keys.

== Distilling Philosophy ==
Paul Joseph Menta has established the Chef Distilled philosophy as "chef first, then distiller". With his culinary background, he compares similarities between healthy cooking and the spirit distilling process, the company prides itself in producing rums with only native Florida ingredients like unrefined Demerara sugar from Belle Glade, Florida, instead of molasses, without any preservatives or artificial flavoring, the Chef's flavored brands use whole vanilla bean stalks and real Key limes grown in the Florida Keys. The simplicity of ingredients and method of distilling six times and filtering out fusel oils that result in headaches produces a cleaner rum.

== Products ==
Key West First Legal Rum is the flagship 80-proof white rum that is brought out of the still at 147 proof with the lower proof giving it more flavor, the name pays tribute to the history of rum running and moonshiners that abounded in the Florida Keys during the prohibition era. White Light is a lighter clear rum that is distilled at a higher proof around 170 to start, which just like vodka gives it a light or neutral flavor, it is then cut with spring water to bring it to 90 proof. The dark rums are brought out of American oak casks twice a year; the salt cured barrels are first soaked in ocean water taken directly from the nearby Simonton beach to give a unique local mineral flavor. Key West Raw and Unfiltered is 80-proof and 105 Simonton, whose name reflects both the distillery address and the proof of the spirit itself. The Chef's Rum line currently features the flavored rums Vanilla Brûlée Dark, Devils Rum, Mint, and Key Lime with Green Coconut, Glazed Pineapple, Duval St. Spiced Rum, Chocolate Soufflé and many more in the works through the federal label approval process.
