= Conch Republic =

Micronation of Key West, Florida

- Micronation (unrecognized entity)
- Flag of the Conch Republic

- Area claimed: Key West, Florida, US
- Claimed by: Dennis Wardlow (mayor of Key West)
- Dates claimed: April 23, 1982–present
- Website https://conchrepublic.com/
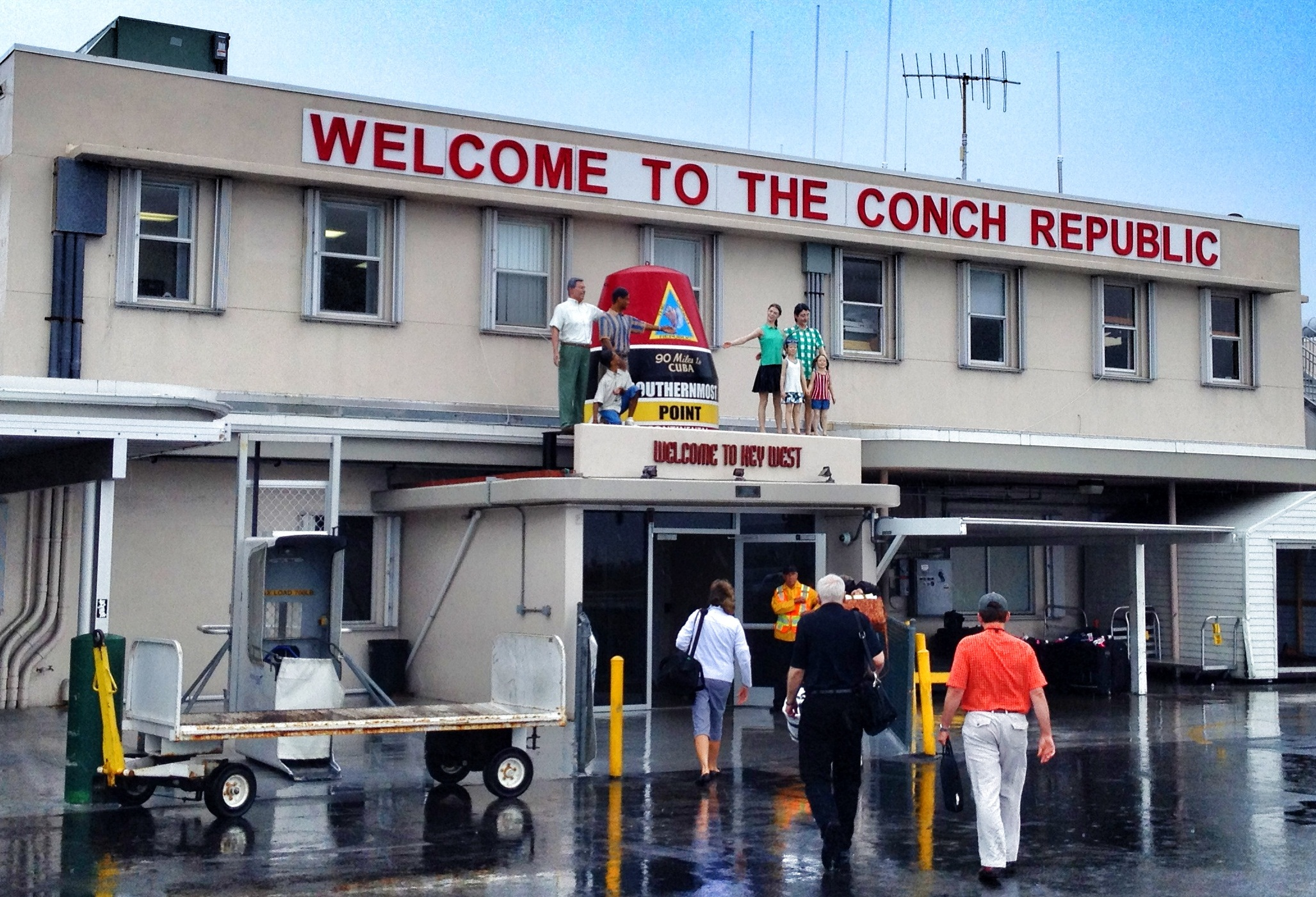
- The sign "WELCOME TO THE CONCH REPUBLIC" greets those arriving at Key West International Airport.

The Conch Republic (/ˈkɒŋk/) is a micronation declared as a secession of the city of Key West, Florida, from the United States on April 23, 1982. It has been maintained as a tourism booster for the city. Since then, the term "Conch Republic" has been expanded to refer to "all of the Florida Keys, or, that geographic apportionment of land that falls within the legally defined boundaries of Monroe County, Florida, northward to 'Skeeter's Last Chance Saloon' in Florida City, Dade County, Florida, with Key West as the micronation's capital and all territories north of Key West being referred to as 'The Northern Territories'".

While the protests that sparked the creation of the Conch Republic (and others since then) have been described by some as "tongue-in-cheek", they were motivated by frustrations over genuine concerns. The original protest event was motivated by a U.S. Border Patrol roadblock and checkpoint that greatly inconvenienced residents and tourists.

The Conch Republic celebrates Independence Day every April 23 as part of a week-long festival of activities involving numerous businesses in Key West, including local rum distilleries like Chef Distilled. The organization—a "Sovereign State of Mind", seeking only to bring more "humor, warmth and respect" to a world in sore need of all three according to its late secretary general, Peter Anderson—is a key tourism booster for the area.

== History ==
In 1982, the United States Border Patrol set up a roadblock and inspection point on US 1 just north of the merger of Monroe County Road 905A/Miami-Dade County Road 905A onto US 1 (the only two roads connecting the Florida Keys with the mainland), in front of the Last Chance Saloon just south of Florida City. Vehicles were stopped and searched for narcotics and illegal immigrants.

The Key West City Council complained repeatedly about the inconvenience for travelers to and from Key West, claiming that it hurt the Keys' important tourism industry. Eastern Air Lines, which had a hub at Miami International Airport, saw a window of opportunity when the roadblocks were established; Eastern was at the time the only airline to establish jet service to Key West International Airport, counting on travelers from Key West to Miami preferring to fly rather than to wait for police to search their vehicles. When the city council's complaints went unanswered by the U.S. federal government and attempts to get an injunction against the roadblock failed in court, as a form of protest Mayor Dennis Wardlow and the council declared Key West's independence on April 23, 1982. As many of the local citizens were referred to as Conchs, the micronation took the name of the Conch Republic.

As part of the protest, Mayor Wardlow was proclaimed prime minister of the republic, which immediately declared war against the United States (symbolically breaking a loaf of stale Cuban bread over the head of a man dressed in a naval uniform), quickly surrendered after one minute (to the man in the uniform), and applied for one billion dollars in foreign aid.

Conch Republic officials were invited to the Summit of the Americas in Miami in 1994, and Conch representatives were officially invited to 1995's Florida Jubilee.

The faux secession and the events surrounding it generated great publicity for the Keys' plight—the roadblock and inspection station were removed soon afterward. It also resulted in the creation of a new avenue of tourism for the Keys.

=== Invasions of 1995 ===
On September 20, 1995, it was reported that the 478th Civil Affairs Battalion of the United States Army Reserve was to conduct a training exercise simulating an invasion of a foreign island. They were to land on Key West and conduct affairs as if the islanders were foreign. However, no one from the 478th notified Conch officials of the exercise.

Seeing another chance at publicity, Wardlow and the forces behind the 1982 Conch Republic secession mobilized the island for a full-scale war, sending the schooner Western Union out to attack an incoming Coast Guard cutter with water balloons, conch fritters and stale Cuban bread (to which the Coast Guard responded with their fire hoses, quickly ending the battle), and protested to the Department of Defense for arranging this exercise without consulting the city officials. The leaders of the 478th issued an apology the next day, saying they "in no way meant to challenge or impugn the sovereignty of the Conch Republic", and submitted to a surrender ceremony on September 22.

During the U.S. federal government shutdown of 1995 and 1996, as a protest, the republic sent a flotilla of Conch Navy, civilian, and fire department boats to Fort Jefferson, located in Dry Tortugas National Park, to reopen it. The action was dubbed a "full-scale invasion" by the Conch Republic. Inspired by efforts of the Smithsonian Institution to keep its museums open by private donations, local residents had raised private money to keep the park running (as a closed park would damage the tourist-dependent local economy), but could find no one to accept the money and reopen the park.

When officials attempted to enter the monument, they were cited. When the citation was contested in court the following year, the resultant case, The United States of America v. Peter Anderson, was quickly dropped.

=== Annexation of Seven Mile Bridge ===
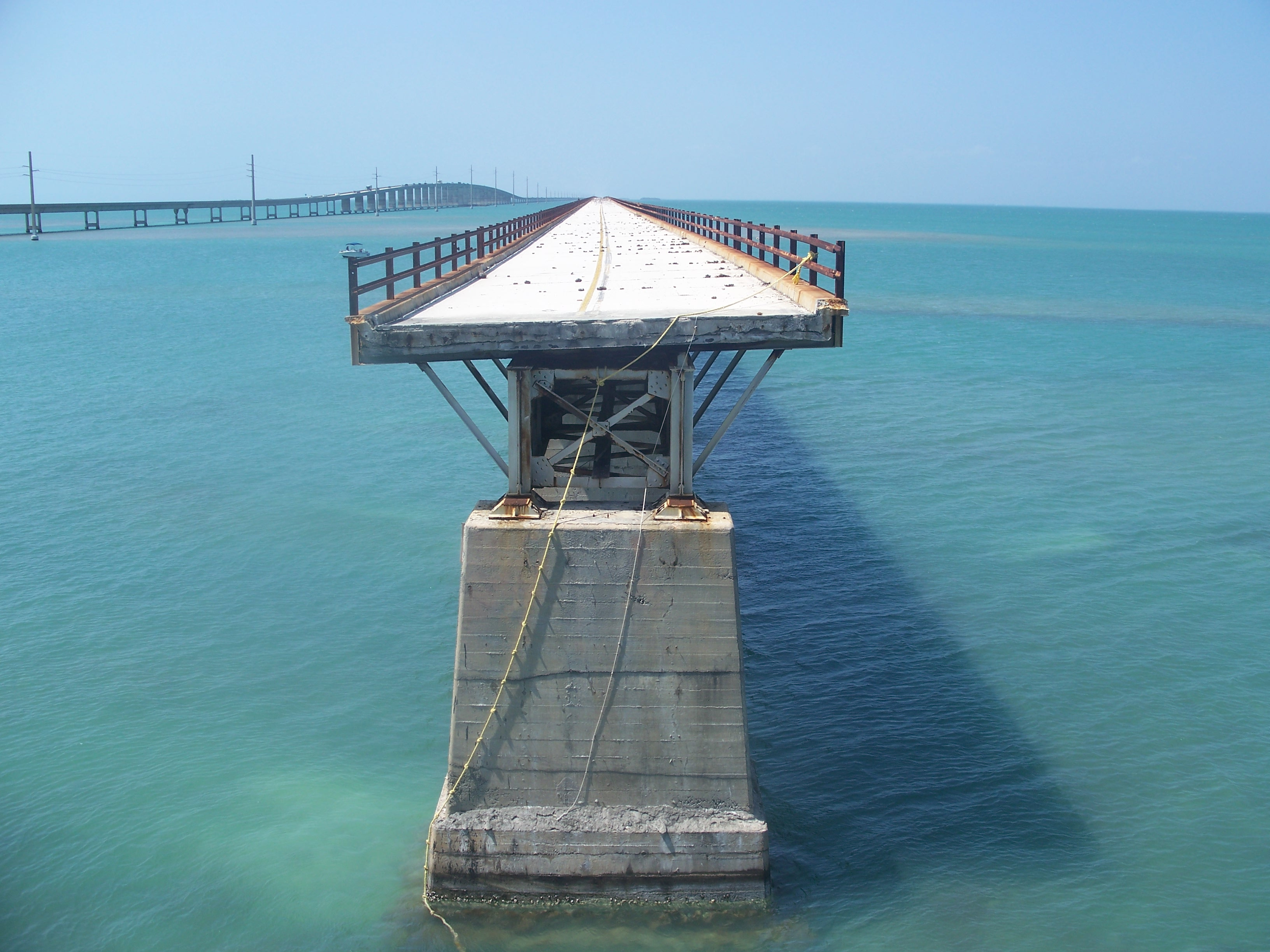
Seven Mile Bridge

On January 13, 2006, Peter Anderson (the defendant in the Dry Tortugas case from 1995 to 1996) purported to annex the abandoned span of Seven Mile Bridge, which had been replaced by a parallel span in 1982. The move was in response to a recent event regarding Cuban refugees. On the previous January 4, fifteen Cuban refugees reached the bridge, but were returned to Cuba by the U.S. Border Patrol because the U.S. government had declared the bridge a "wet feet" location under the wet feet, dry feet policy. The rationale was that, since two sections of the span had been removed and it was no longer connected to land, it was not part of U.S. territory subject to the "dry feet" rule, and thus the refugees could not stay.

Anderson, seizing upon the U.S.'s apparent disavowal of the abandoned span, claimed it for the Republic. He expressed hope to use the bridge for affordable, ecologically friendly housing. In response, Russel Schweiss, spokesman for Florida governor Jeb Bush, declared, "With all due respect to the Conch Republic, the bridge belongs to all the people of Florida, and we're not currently in negotiations to sell it." The refugee decision was later overturned, but only after the refugees had been returned to Cuba.

=== Recent history ===
In another protest, beginning in 2008, the northern keys including Key Largo formed a separation of the Conch Republic known as the Independent Northernmost Territories of the Conch Republic. Proponents claim this separation is a result of disagreements over the definition and use of the term "Conch Republic".

As of 2022, the southernmost point buoy mentions the Conch Republic.

== Souvenir passports and vehicle registration ==
The flag of the Conch Republic.

Through their website, the republic issues passports as souvenirs, but some have evidently bought them in the mistaken belief they are legitimate travel and identity documents. Shortly after the September 11 attacks, FBI investigators thought that hijacker Mohamed Atta had possibly purchased a Conch Republic passport from the website. International vehicle registration code stickers can also be purchased from vendors in Key West, bearing the initials "KW" and "CR"—the country codes for Kuwait and Costa Rica, respectively.

== Military ==
The Conch Republic actively maintains an Army, Navy, and Air Force whose primary duties are to help re-enact the Great Sea Battle of 1982 and the retaking of Fort Jefferson. The Conch Republic Navy comprises no fewer than 10 civilian boats and the schooner Wolf under the command of Admiral Finbar Gittelman. The Army consists of the 1st Conch Artillery, garrisoned in Fort Taylor.

The Conch Republic Air Force has more than a dozen appointed aircraft in its fleet. The flagship, a 1942 Waco, was flown by Fred R. Cabanas, a legendary stunt pilot and ambassador for the Conch Republic at air shows worldwide. He flew "Conch Fury" in the 2005 Reno Air Races. Fred was declared General of the Air Force by the mayor of Key West after intercepting a defecting Cuban MiG-23 with his Pitts Special in 1991. Following his death in January 2013, Fred was succeeded by his son, Raymond Cabanas.

== In literature ==
Some of the action in Joe Haldeman's 1989 science fiction novel Buying Time (published in UK as The Long Habit of Living) takes place in the Conch Republic, a lawless place where assassination and other activities are perfectly legal.

Science fiction writer Spider Robinson's Callahan's Crosstime Saloon series—about an Irish bar full of time travellers, aliens and musicians—find themselves relocated to the Conch Republic in the 2000 novel Callahan's Key.

== National anthem ==
In 1994, Joe and Meri-Lynn Britz wrote the national anthem for the Conch Republic, "Conch Republic". It was recorded by the Key Lime Pie band and voted on and accepted by the city of Key West City Commissioners.

== See also ==
- Forgottonia, a secessionist movement in Illinois in the 1970s
- Maritime Republic of Eastport, a secessionist movement in Annapolis, Maryland
