= Craig Cates =

American politician

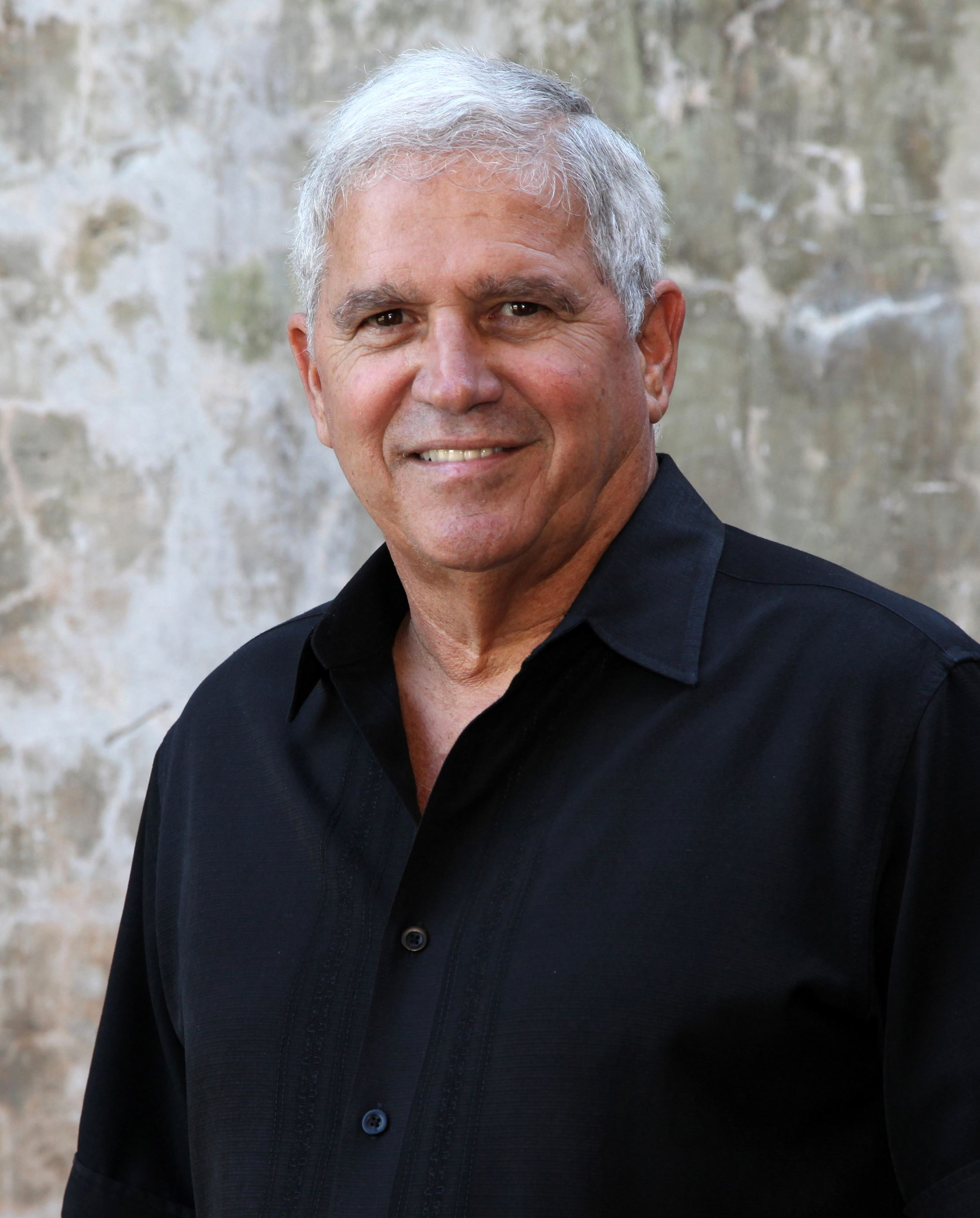
- Official portrait, c. 2020

Mayor of Key West
- In office October 1, 2009 – November 19, 2018
- Preceded by: Morgan McPherson
- Succeeded by: Teri Johnston

Craig C. Cates (born Key West, Florida) is an American politician, retired businessman and former boat and car racing champion. Cates served as mayor of Key West from October 1, 2009, to November 19, 2018. Following his mayoral service, Cates entered county government and became a member of the Monroe County Commission. Craig was married to Cheryl Hollen Cates who died of COVID-19 on December 2, 2020. He also is the father of three daughters. He has four grandchildren. Some of Craig Cates' hobbies include yachting, fishing, and pulling lobster traps. Cates was succeeded by Teri Johnston after he did not run for reelection.

== Early life and business career ==
Cates is a fourth-generation resident of Key West, Florida. Before entering elected office, he was a businessman and owned a Napa Auto Parts store in Key West.
