= International Imitation Hemingway Competition =

The International Imitation Hemingway Competition, also known as the Bad Hemingway Contest, was an annual writing competition begun in Century City, California. Started in 1977 as a "promotional gag", and held for nearly 30 years, the contest pays mock homage to Ernest Hemingway by encouraging authors to submit a 'really good page of really bad Hemingway' in a Hemingway-esque style.

Submissions have included such titles as "Big Too-Hardened Liver" (1992 winner), "The Old Man and the Flea" (2002 winner), "The Bug Count also Rises", "Across the Suburbs and Into the Express Lane at Von's" (2000 winner, Scott Stavrou) and "The Short, Happy Life of Frances' Comb."

The competition, as created, had two rules: mention Harry's Bar & Grill (the Venetian Harry's was long one of Hemingway's favorite watering holes) and be funny. First prize was round-trip tickets and dinner for two at Harry's in Florence, Italy.

In addition to the humor of the contest, there is irony in its existence, as Hemingway famously said: "The step up from writing parodies is writing on the wall above the urinal." Nevertheless, the contest had thousands of dedicated enthusiasts among writers and Hemingway fans, drawing more than 24,000 entries in its first ten years of operation. Many notable literary figures judged the contest over the years, including Digby Diehl, Jack Smith, Ray Bradbury, Barnaby Conrad, George Plimpton, Bernice Kert, Jack Hemingway, A. Scott Berg, and Joseph Wambaugh.

In the late 1970s, seeking to promote Harry's Bar & American Grill in Century City, California, bar owners Jerry Magnin and Larry Mindel consulted advertising executive Paul Keye, who suggested the contest to capitalize on Hemingway's literary references to "Harry's". The contest announcement in The New Yorker magazine stated, "One very good page of very bad Hemingway will send you and a friend to Italy for dinner." For the 11th Annual Contest, to promote the contest's move from (closing) Century City to the San Francisco Harry's, PR firm Tellem Worldwide recruited noted San Francisco authors Herb Caen, Lawrence Ferlinghetti and Cyra McFadden as judges.

In 1988, after 11 years of contests, Spectrum Foods Inc., the new owners of Harry's in Los Angeles, ended their sponsorship of the contest because of escalating costs. At this time literary organization PEN Center West took over sponsorship. American Airlines' in-flight magazine American Way began printing contest-winning entries, and continued the grand prize of a flight to Italy. In 2000 United Airlines assumed sponsorship of the contest, publishing winning entries in their in-flight and online Hemispheres Magazine. United Airlines' support continued until the 2005 contest, following which the competition ended. The final winning parody was entitled "Da Movable Code."

Hemingway's spare writing style had often been imitated prior to the contest. Since then, two anthologies of Imitation Hemingway have been published (The Best of Bad Hemingway, Volumes I & II) and include contest winners as well as satires of Hemingway written by E. B. White, Raymond Chandler, F. Scott Fitzgerald and George Plimpton.
