= Sloppy Joe's =

Historic bar in Key West, Florida, US

- Sloppy Joe's Bar
- U.S. National Register of Historic Places
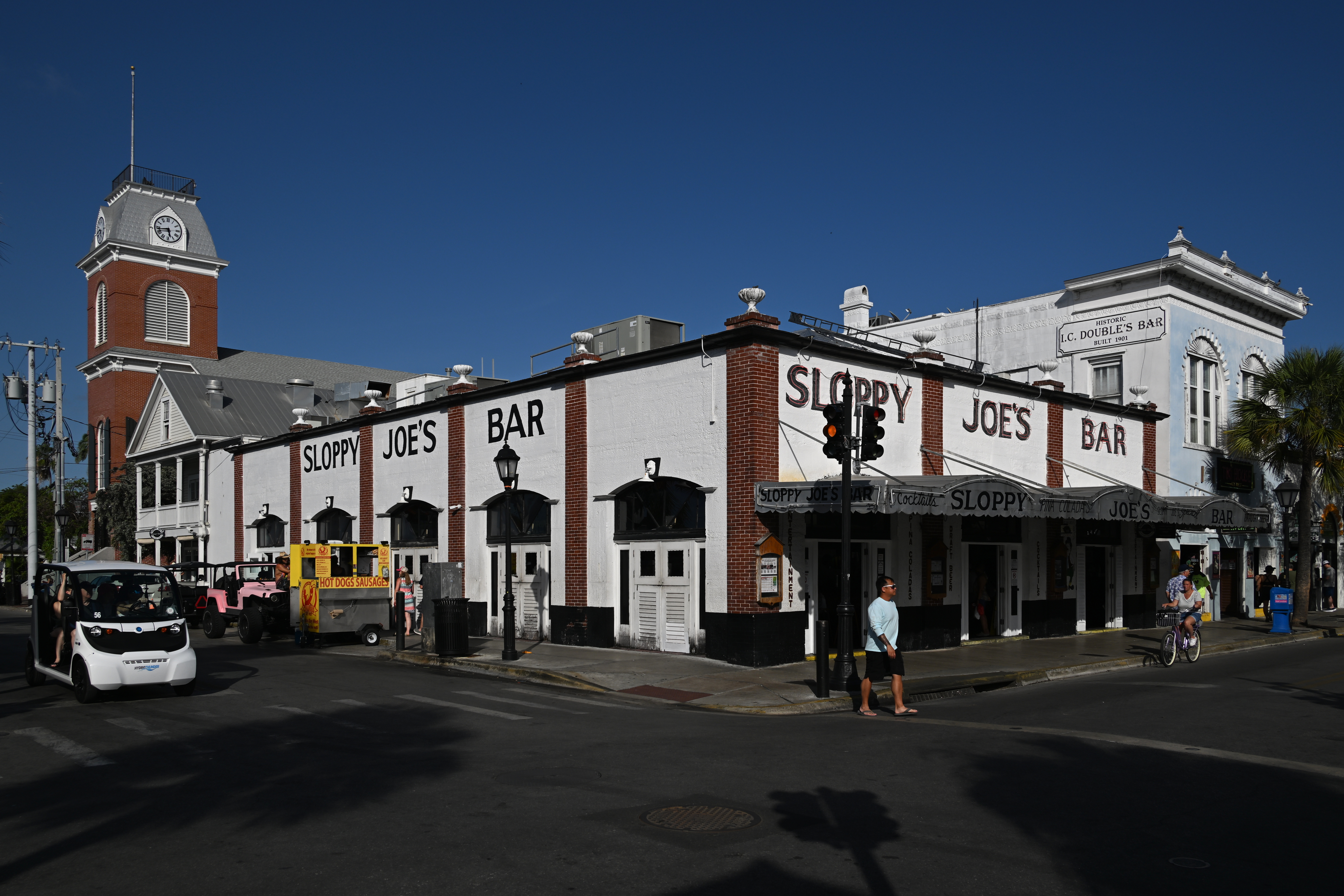
- Sloppy Joe's Bar
- Location: Key West, Florida, United States
- Coordinates: 24.55906°N 81.80503°W
- Built: 1917
- NRHP reference No.: 06000957
- Added to NRHP: November 1, 2006

Sloppy Joe's Bar is a historic American bar in Key West, Florida, located at the corner of Greene and Duval Street since 1937. A frequent haunt of famous writer Ernest Hemingway, it is now home to the annual Hemingway Days celebration and its Hemingway Look-Alike Contest.

== History ==
The main Bar structure was built in 1917; and the second building, which houses the Kitchen and Sloppy Joe's retail store, was built in 1892. Famous writer Ernest Hemingway was a regular patron of the bar in the 1930s. Sloppy Joe's was purchased September 8, 1978 by Sid Snelgrove and Jim Mayer and has been owned by the two families since that time. After its manager Michael Walton came up with the idea in 1980, Hemingway Days became an annual celebration of Hemingway's life at the bar every July, including a Hemingway Look-Alike Contest. On November 1, 2006, Sloppy Joe's was added to the National Register of Historic Places.

== Other locations ==
Sloppy Joe's has locations in Treasure Island, Florida and Daytona Beach, Florida.

== Gallery ==
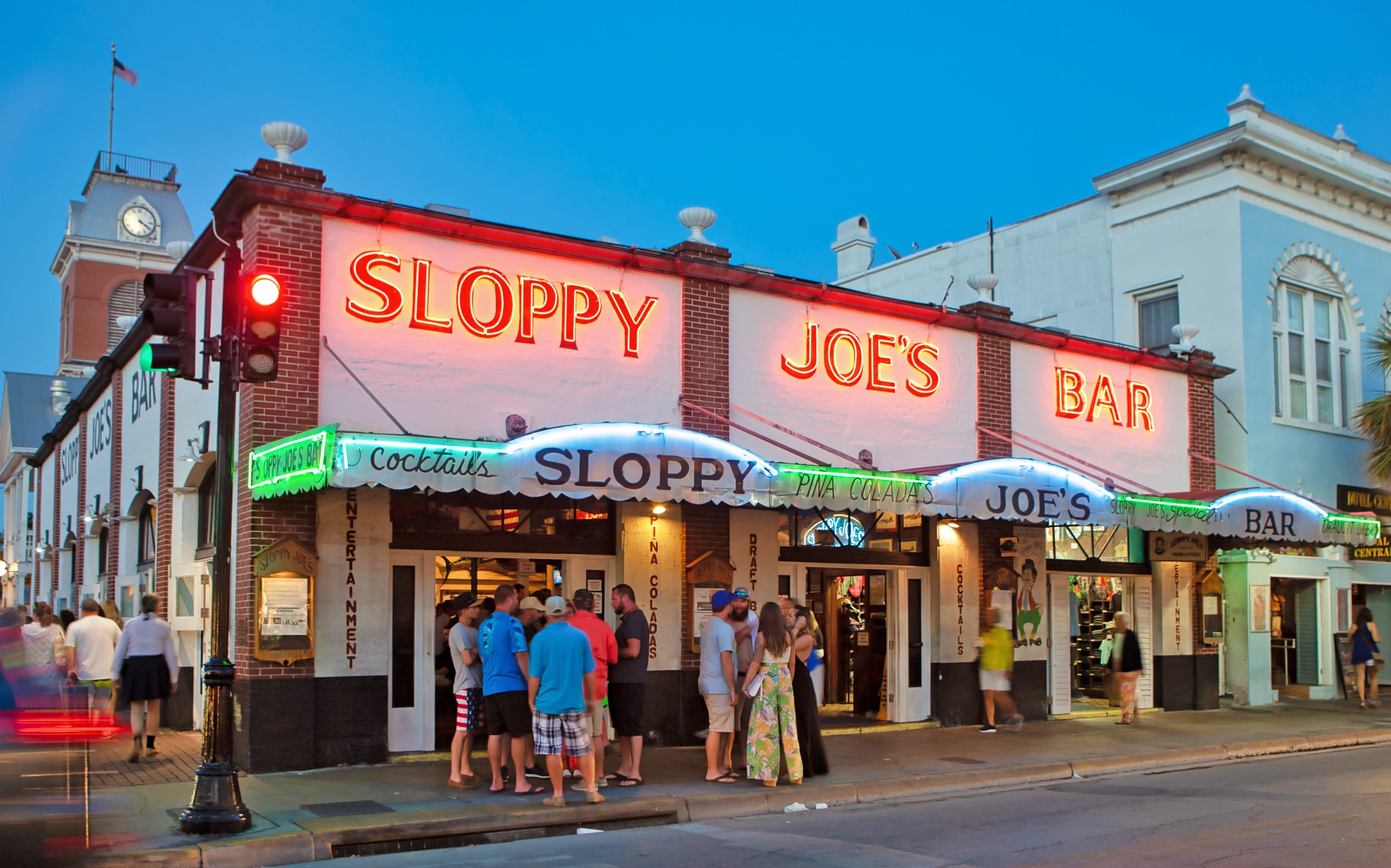

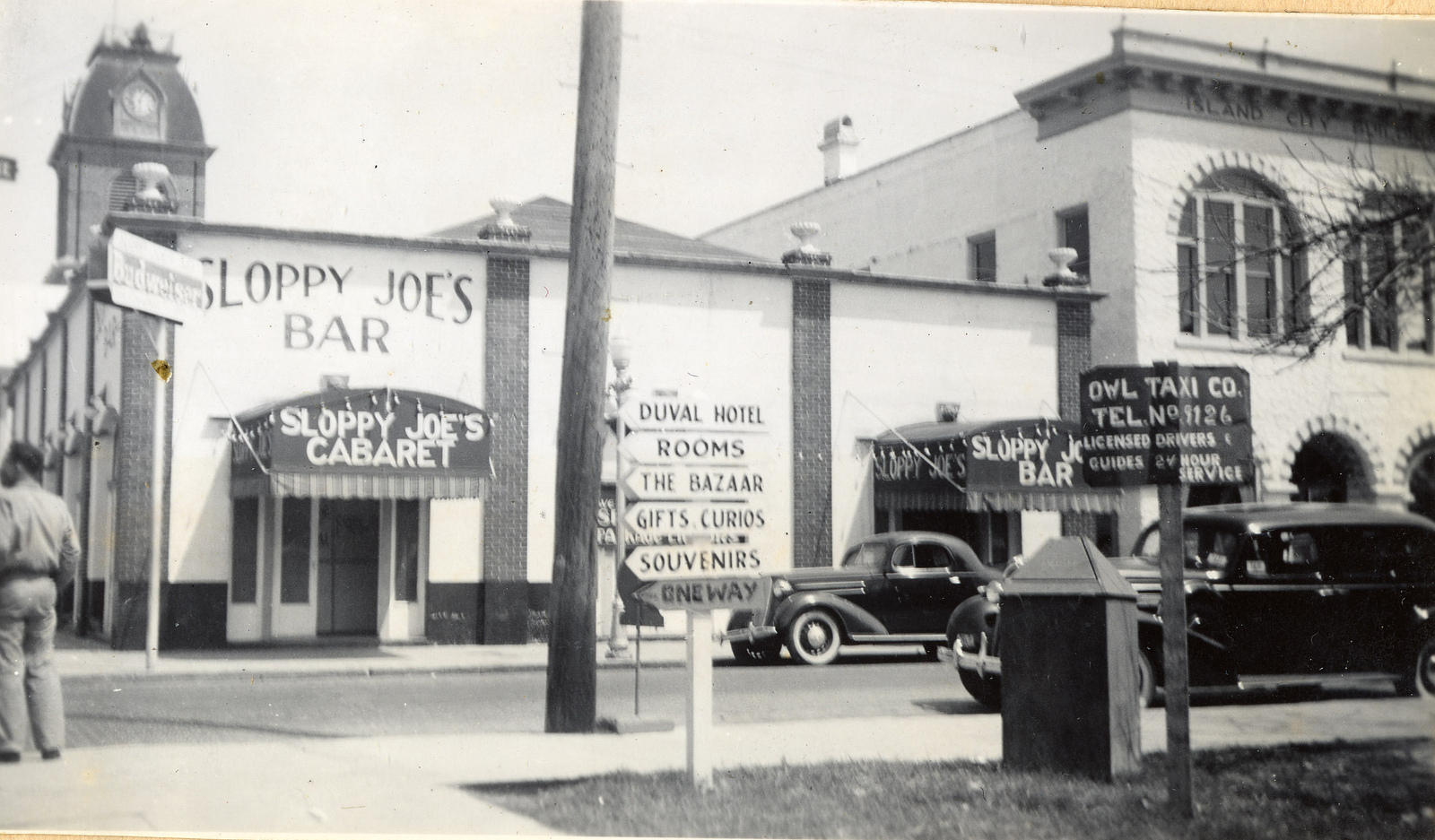

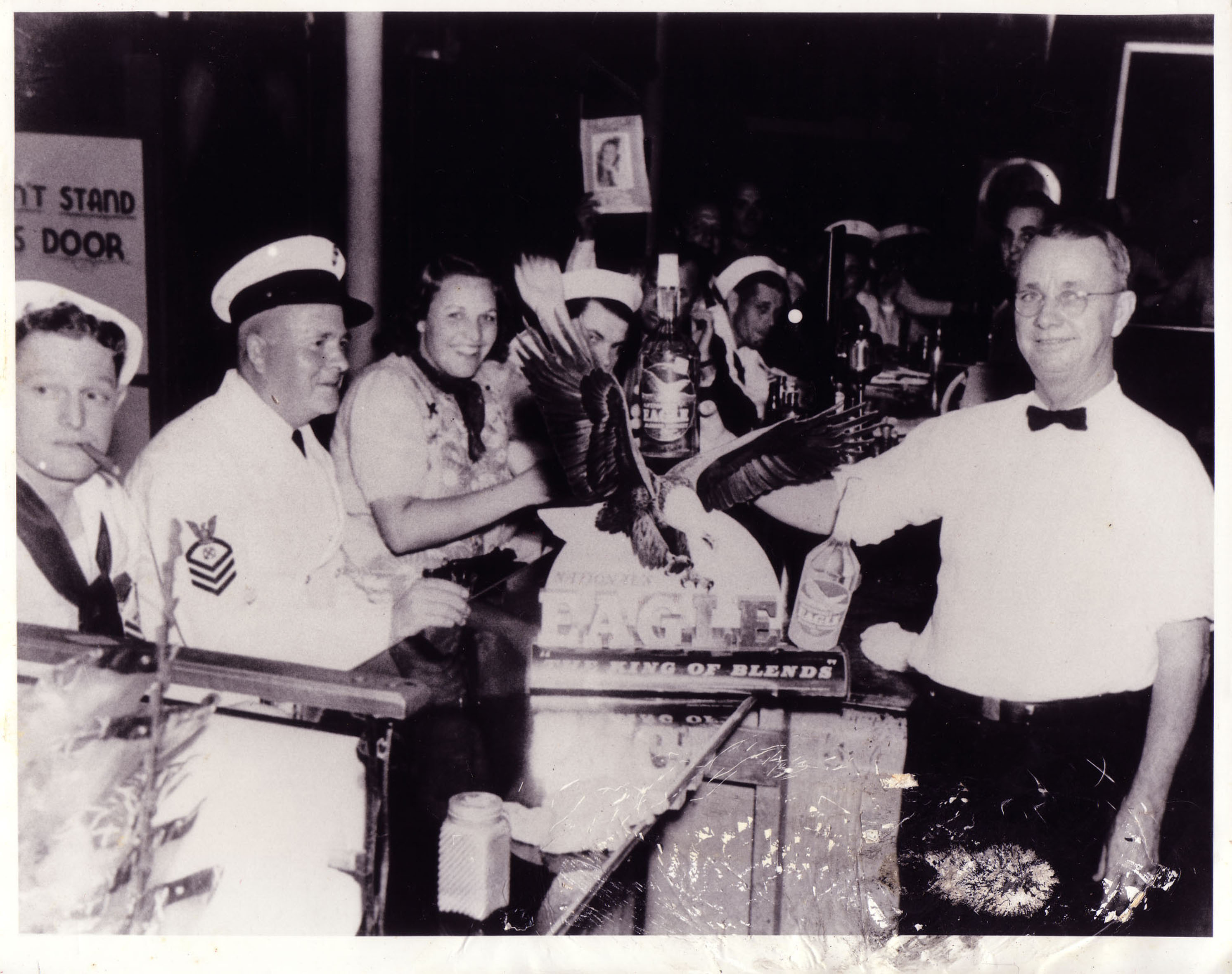
Joe “Sloppy Joe” Russell behind bar.

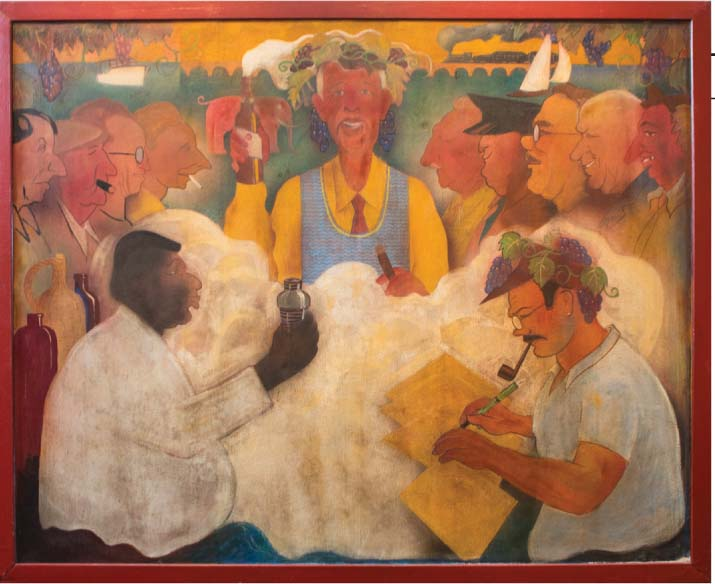

The Silver Slipper dance hall adjacent to Sloppy Joe's, painted in the 1930s by Waldo Peirce

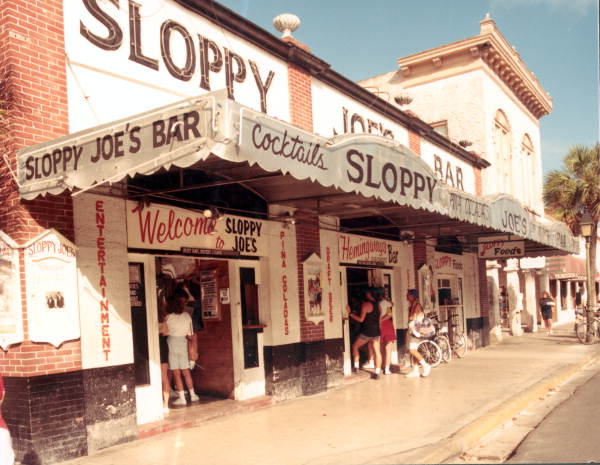
The bar, circa 1986

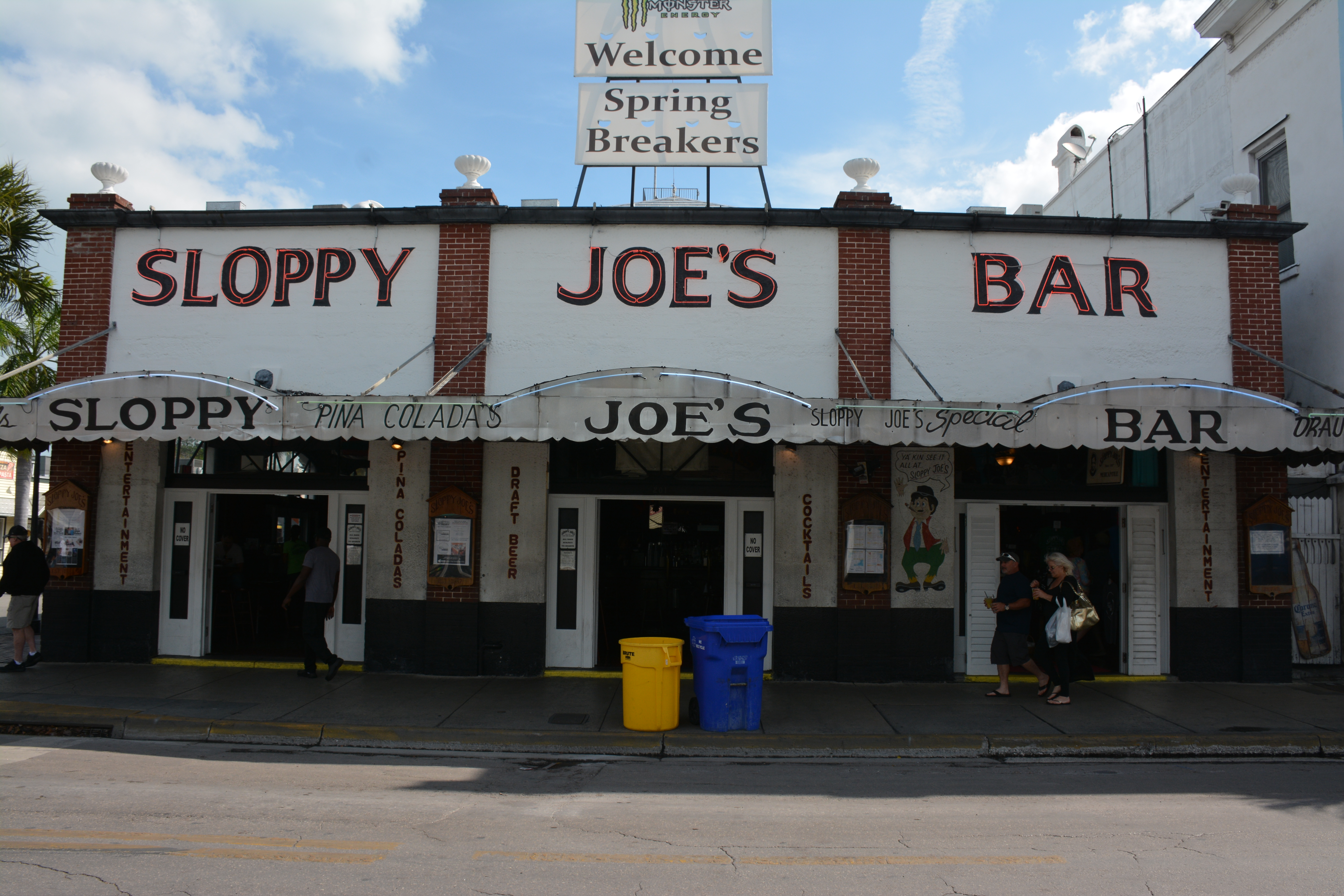
The bar, 2017

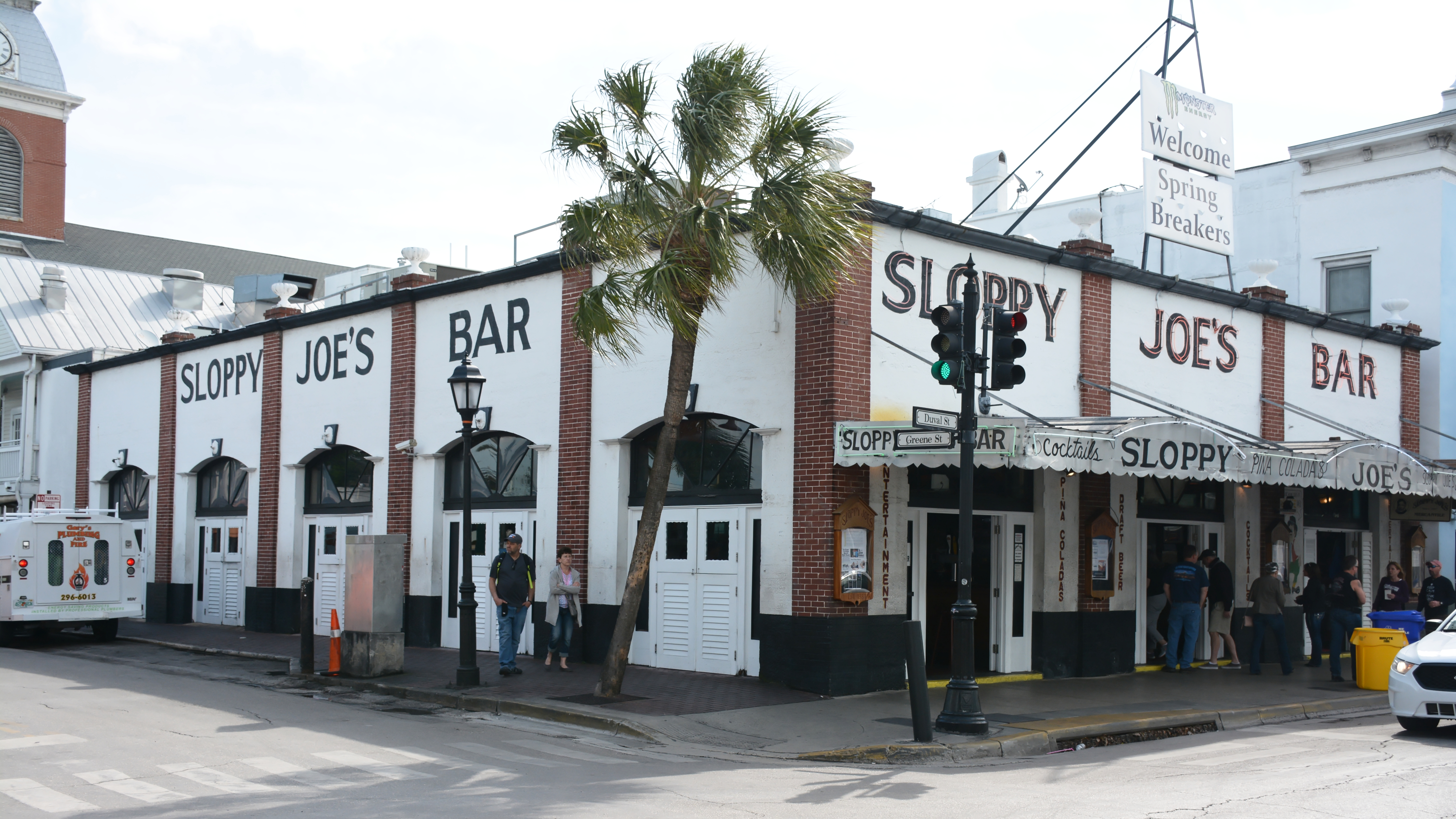
The bar, 2017

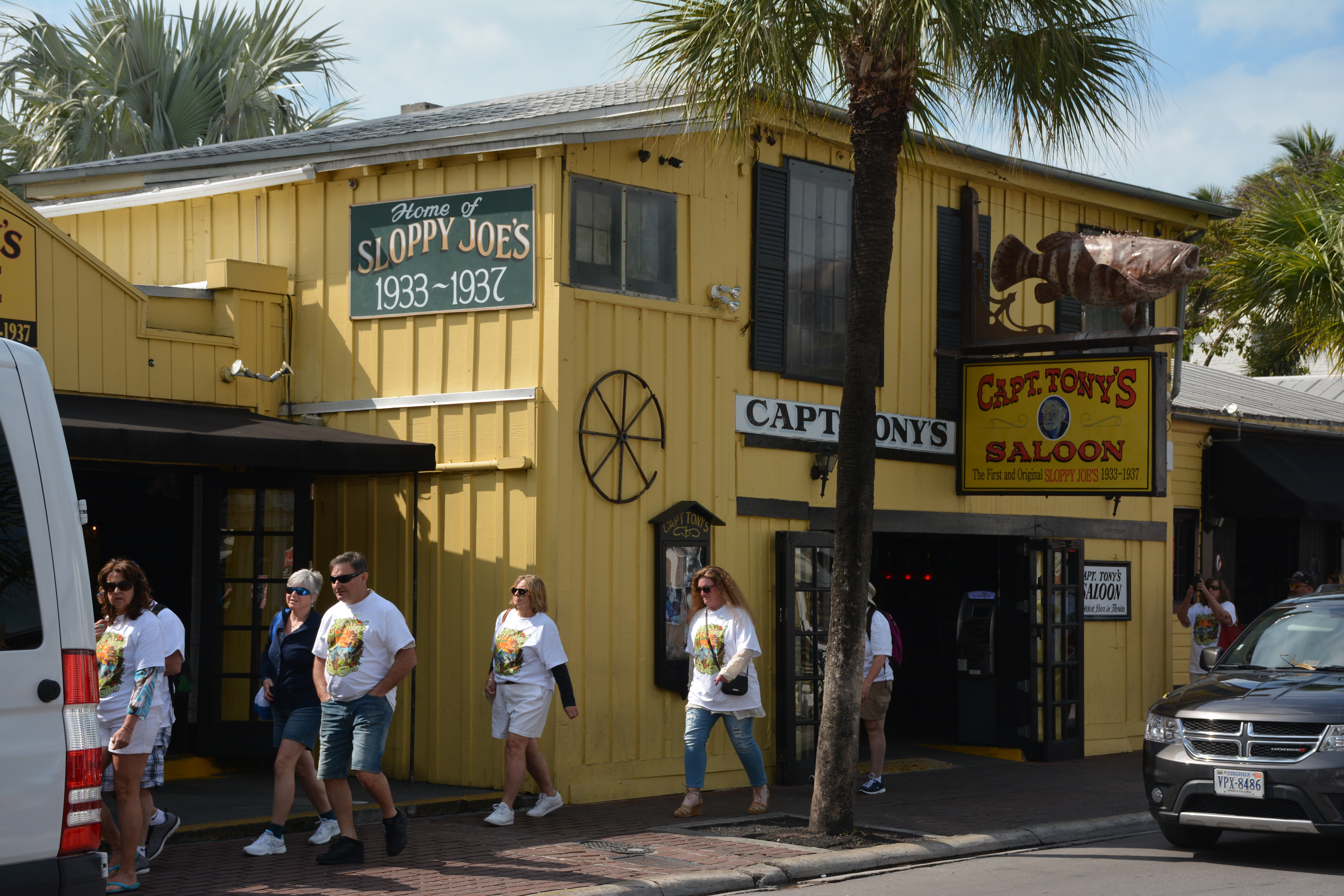
The original location, 2017

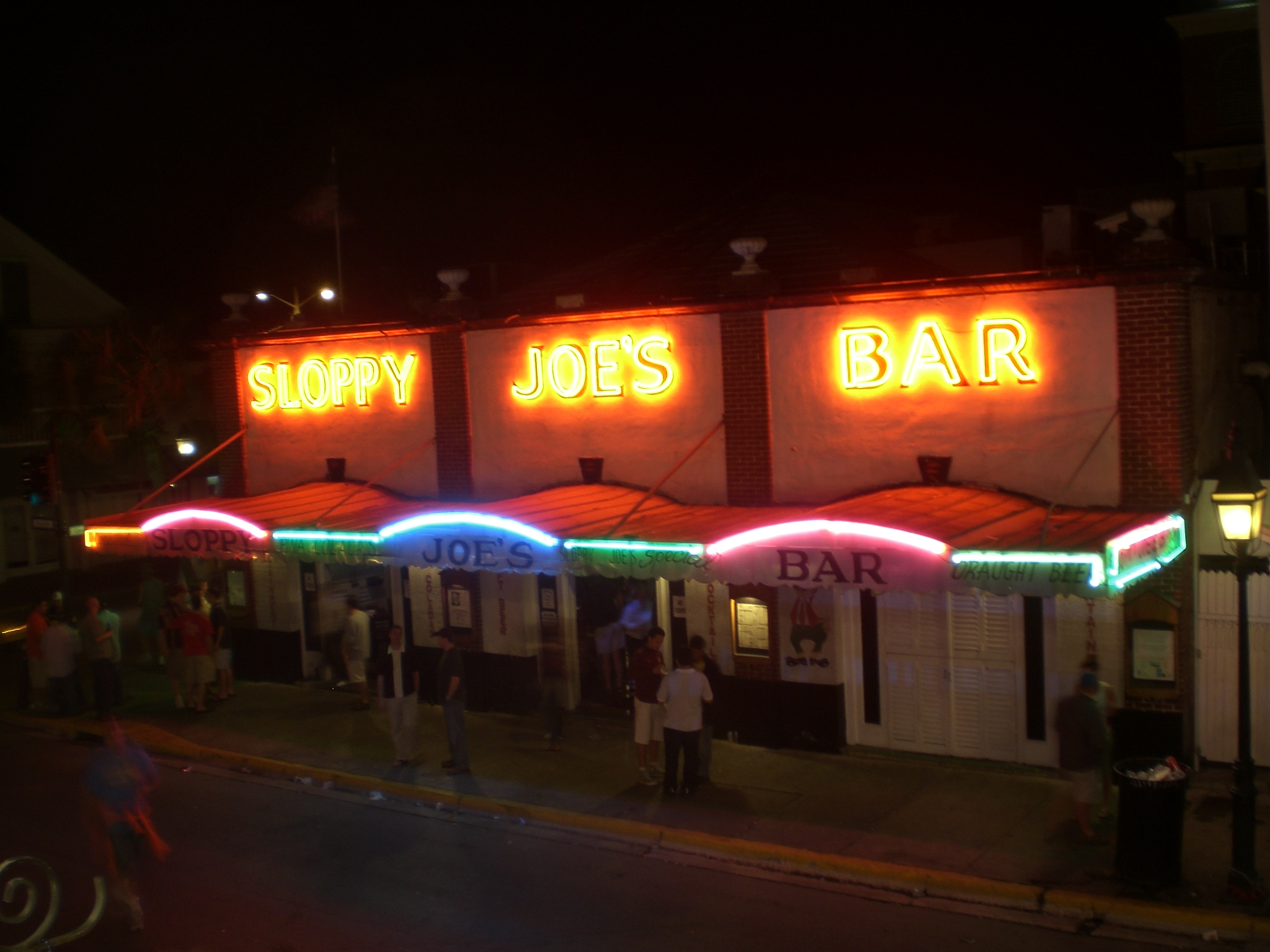

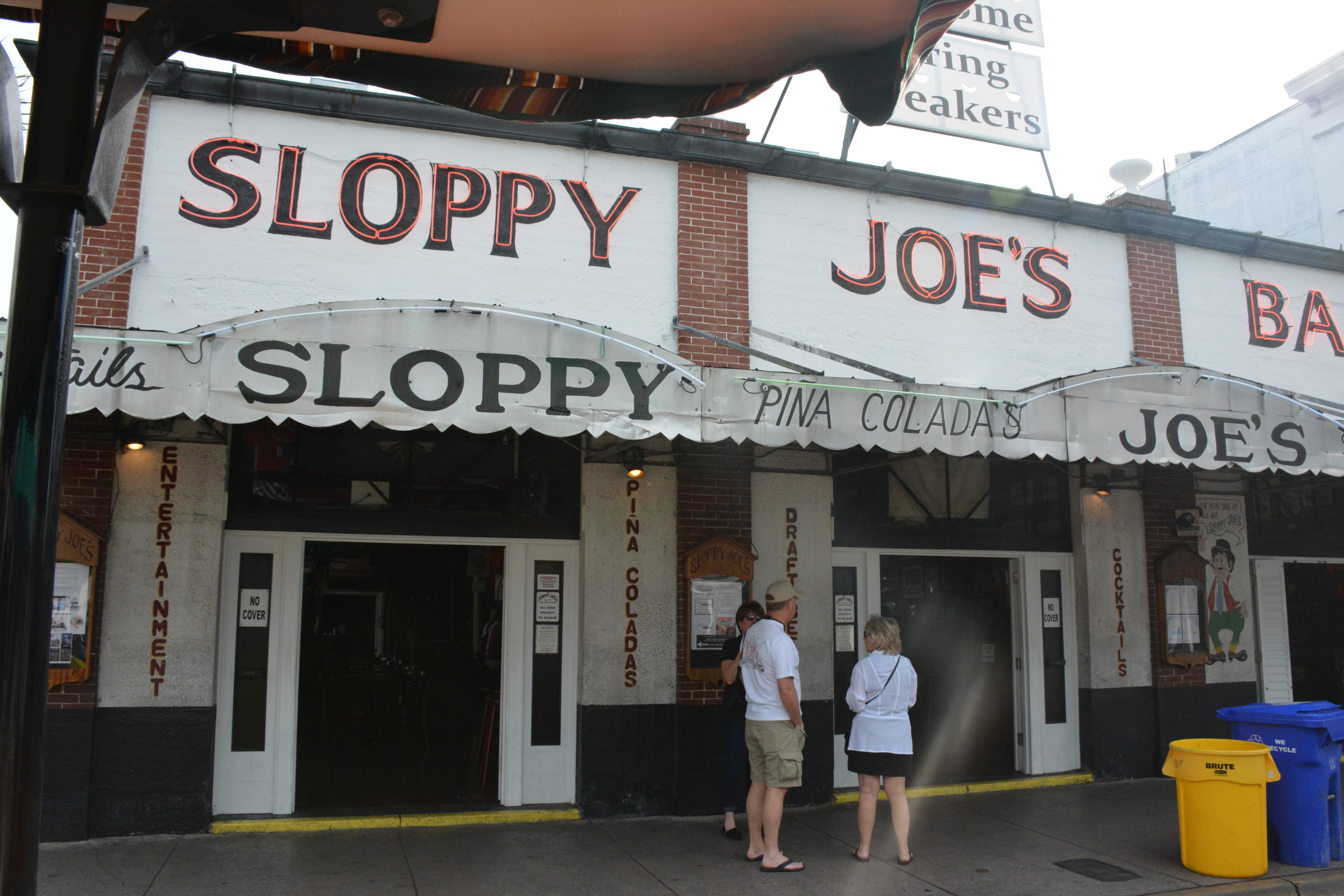
