= Jim Weekley =

American politician

James F. "Jimmy" Weekley (born 1947 in Key West, Florida) is an American politician, who served as mayor of Key West from 1999 to 2005. Prior to his election as mayor, he served fourteen years as a member of the City Commission and was elected three times as mayor pro tem. He was re-elected to the city commission in 2009.

In the 1980s, as Key West experienced rapid growth in the tourism industry, Weekley was instrumental in passage of a Growth Management Ordinance. The ordinance insured that growth in the hotel sector would be matched with the production of work force housing. The ordinance received the Award for Excellence from the Florida Chapter of the American Planning Association. Weekly was also active in cultural and environmental preservation initiatives designed to protect the character of Key West in the face of rapid economic and social change.

Weekley and his family own Fausto's Food Palace, a gourmet grocery store in Key West. He graduated from Mary Immaculate High School and Florida Southern College.

A past chairman of the Monroe County Democratic Party, Weekley serves on the South Florida Regional Planning Council and was chairman in 1997 and 1998. From 1985 to 1990, he served as chairman and member of the environmental quality committee of the Florida League of Cities. He is a member of the U.S. Conference of Mayors.

Weekley has also been a member of the Jaycees, Art and Historical Society of Key West, the Chamber of Commerce, and the Business Guild. He is also a member of the board of the Associated Grocers of Florida.
