= Richard A. Heyman =

American politician

Richard Heyman

Mayor of Key West, Florida
- In office 1987 – 1989
- In office 1983 – 1985

Personal details
- Born: c. 1935 Grand Rapids, Ohio
- Died: September 16, 1994 (aged 59)
- Education: Ohio State University
- Profession: Business owner

Richard A. Heyman (c. 1935 – September 16, 1994) was an American mayor who was mayor of Key West, Florida from 1983 to 1985 and from 1987 to 1989. He was one of the first openly gay public officials in the United States.

== Early life ==
Richard A. Heyman was born circa 1935. He grew up in Grand Rapids, Ohio. He graduated from Ohio State University in 1957.

== Career ==
Heyman began his career as a schoolteacher in Grand Rapids, Ohio. He later works in recruitment in Toledo, Ohio. In the 1960s, he moved to Key West, Florida, where he co-founded the Gingerbread Square Gallery in 1972.

Heyman served as the mayor of Key West, Florida from 1983 to 1985 and from 1987 to 1989. He was one of the first openly gay public officials in the United States. Under his leadership, the City of Key West passed a resolution to make it illegal for employers to fire staff who had HIV/AIDS.

== Personal life, death and legacy ==
Heyman had a long-time partner, John Kiraly. He died of AIDS-related pneumonia on September 16, 1994. He was 59 years old.

His papers are held at the Cornell University Library in Ithaca, New York.

The Richard A. Heyman Environmental Pollution Control Facility in Key West was named in his honor. In 2010, a documentary about Richard Heyman's first term as mayor, directed by John Mikytuck, The Newcomer, was released.
